= Filler (packaging) =

Machine to insert content into packaging

Fillers (or filling machines) are used for packaging, mainly for food/beverage but for other products as well. These are used to fill either a bottle or a pouch, depending on the product.

There are several types of fillers used by the packaging industry. The following are the most common:

- Auger/agitator fillers: designed to fill dry mixes, such as flour and sugar. The fillers have a hopper shaped like a cone that holds the mix and puts it in a pouch using an auger conveyor that is controlled by the agitator. The mix is filled in a pouch that is made of paper or poly that is formed in a collar and the pouch gets sealed by a series of heaters and dies. The interface with the process supplying the powder is of prime importance to ensure an efficient filling.
- Vibratory weigh fillers: provide a blend of accuracy, speed, and versatility for linear feeders. Every weighing-hopper is designed to handle the needs for precise weights.
- Flow fillers: designed for liquids, oils, and thin food products. These fillers are designed when they fill a bottle or tub that enters the machine, the ejects the open bottle back onto another conveyor for sealing.
- Tablet fillers: These are designed for products that are counted by pieces instead of weight. These are designed for small bottles (similar to some of the flow fillers), but the hopper of the filler is set up to permit scan counting of tablets or candy pieces.
- Positive displacement pump fillers: positive displacement, pump filling machines easily handle a wide range of container sizes, fill volumes and product types. While originally designed for filling creams, gels and lotions these fillers also handle water thin and heavy paste products. Some of the products this machine easily fills are cosmetic creams, heavy sauces, thick shampoo and hair conditioners, honey, hair gels, paste cleaners, and car wax.
- Tube filling machinery: Tubes usually have viscous products and require special filling equipment.
- Vertical form fill sealing machines form packages such as pouches. fill them and heat seal the tops.

== See also ==
- Check weigher
- Multihead weigher
- Quality assurance
- Validation and verification
