= Multihead weigher =

Weighing machine

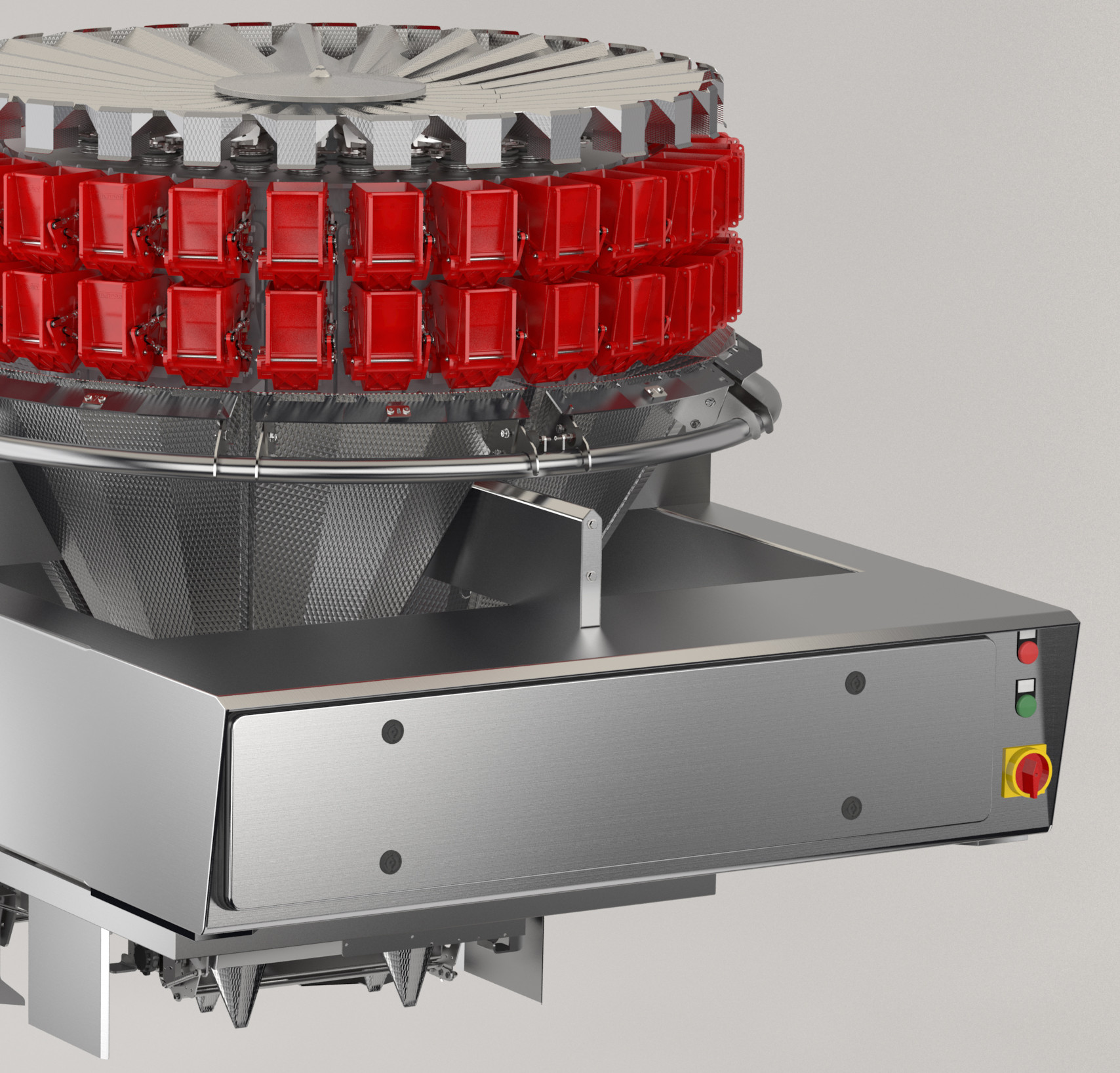
Multihead weigher (28 heads)

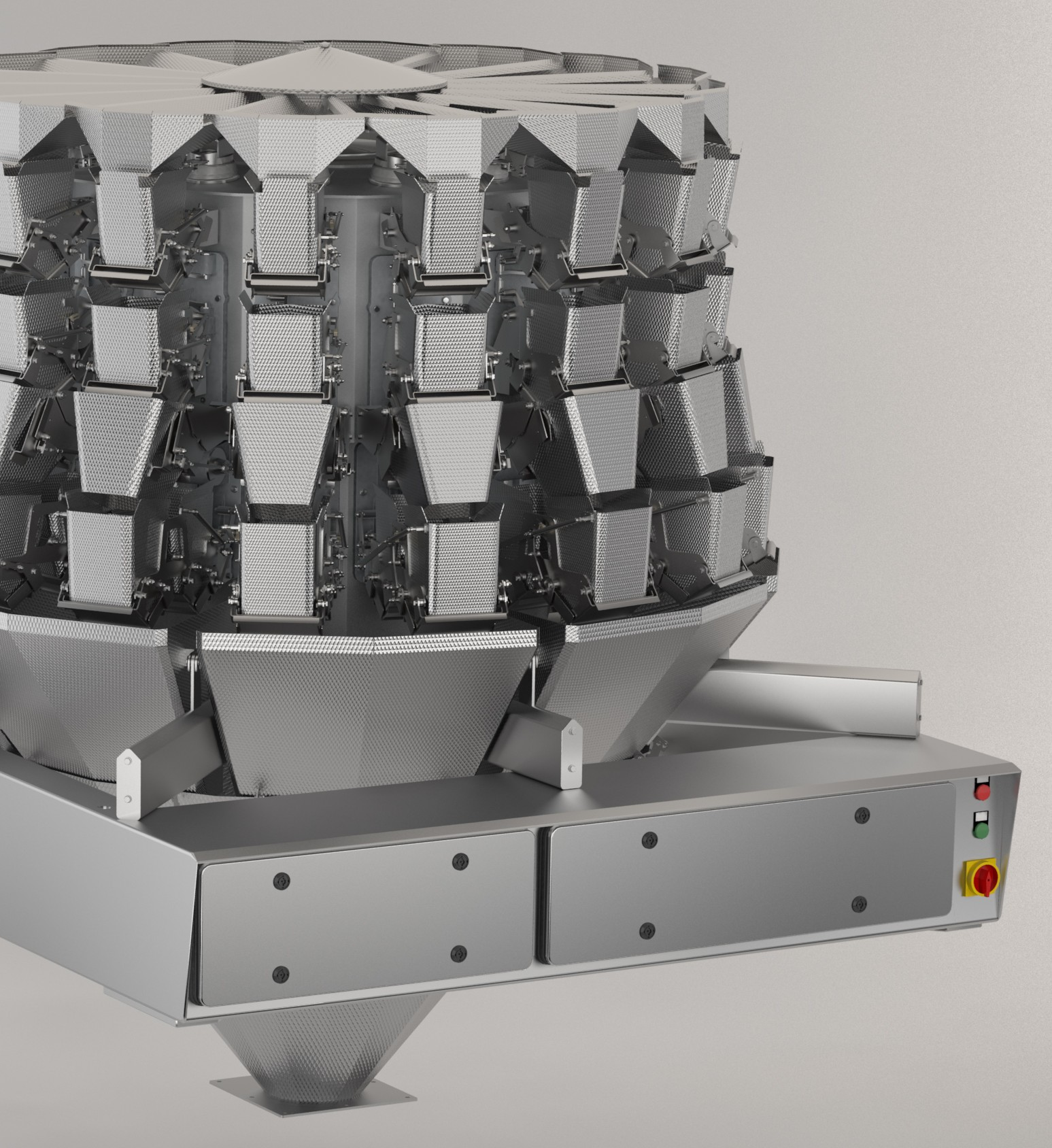
Multihead weigher (24 heads) with memory hoppers for quick discharge.

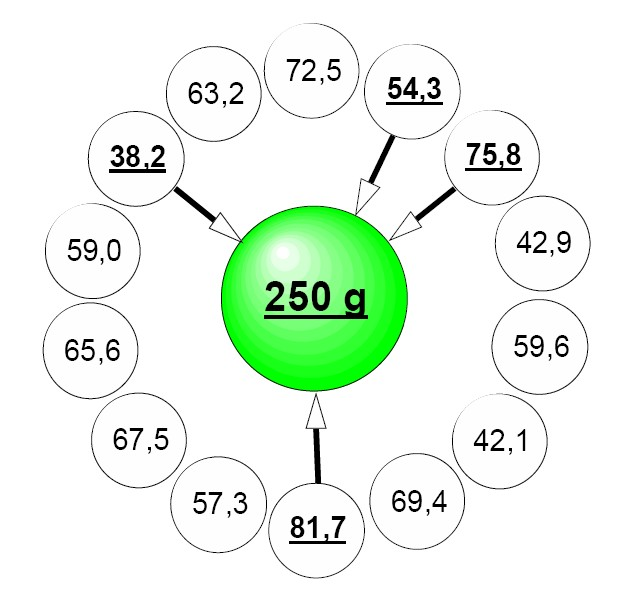
Combination of partial weights with multihead weigher (14 heads), target weight 250 g.

A multihead weigher is a fast, accurate and reliable weighing machine, used in packing both food and non-food products.

== History ==
The multihead weigher was invented and developed by Ishida in the 1970s and launched into the food industry across the world.

Today this kind of machine, thanks to its high speed and accuracy, has achieved widespread adoption in the packaging industry and is produced worldwide by a number of manufacturers. Some manufacturers offer complete packaging lines, integrating the multihead weigher with other packaging machinery ranging from bagmakers (including Vertical Form Fill and Seal bagmakers) to traysealers such as Tray sealing machines, and inspection systems including check weighers and X-ray inspection systems.

== How multihead weighing works ==
A ‘typical target’ weight per pack might be 100 grams of a product. The product is fed to the top of the multihead weigher where it is dispersed to the pool hoppers. Each pool hopper drops the product into a weigh hopper beneath it as soon as the weigh hopper becomes empty.

The weigher’s computer determines the weight of product in each individual weigh hopper and identifies which combination contains the weight closest to the target weight of 100 g. The multihead weigher opens all the hoppers of this combination and the product falls, via a discharge chute, into a bagmaker or, alternatively, into a distribution system which places the product, for example, into trays.

Dispersion is normally by gravity, vibration or centrifugal force, while feeding can be driven by vibration, gravity, belts, or screw systems.

An extra layer of hoppers (‘booster hoppers’) can be added to store product which has been weighed in the weigh hoppers but not used in a weighment, thus increasing the number of suitable combinations available to the computer and so increasing speed and accuracy.

== How multihead weighing can help a business ==
Multihead weighing can help in the following ways:

Filling bags

The range of bags which can be filled using multihead weighers is immense. At one end of the scale are large catering packs of many kilogrammes. At the other are small bags of crisps which can be handled at high speed and efficiency.

Mix-weighing

Products containing up to eight components can be mixed on a multihead weigher, very accurately at high speeds. The weigher is divided into sections, each with its own infeed. For example, a breakfast cereal containing hazelnuts and dried fruit plus two relatively cheap ingredients, could be weighed on a multihead with say eight heads devoted to each of the more expensive components and four heads to each of the other two. This would ensure high weighing speed while ensuring that overfilling of the expensive ingredients was negligible.

Placing into trays

A well-engineered distribution system enables you to combine the speed and accuracy of multihead weighing with precise, splash-free delivery of product into trays.

== Applications ==
Multihead weighers were used initially for weighing certain vegetables. Their use expanded exponentially in the 1970s and 1980s when they were applied to the rapid weighing of snacks and confectionery into bags. What cherry tomatoes and crisps had in common was that they flowed easily through the machine and into the pack, with no more encouragement than gravity and a moderate level of vibration of the feeders. Since then, the accuracy and relative speed have been extended to many products which would in the early days of the technology have been seen as difficult to handle.

Sticky products

Fresh meat and fish, whether in a sauce or not, poultry and cheese (including grated cheese) can be moved along by using belts or screw feeders rather than vibration.

Granules and powders

While free-flowing, fine-grained powders can be weighed more cheaply by other means (such as cut-gate or linear weighers, or volumetric feeders), granules such as coffee granules and products such as loose tea can be weighed on today’s multiheads.

Fragile products

Weighers with more shallow angles of descent and various cushioned inserts have made it possible to pack delicate and brittle items such as hand-made chocolates and gourmet biscuits. These are often paired with baggers or other packaging systems designed to handle fragile products.

Complex products

Using mix-weighing combined with a distribution system tailored to deliver separate components into a tray, a ready meal can be assembled with just the right quantities of, say, rice, meat and vegetables in the appropriate compartments.

== See also ==
- Check weigher
- Packaging machinery
- Vertical form fill sealing machine
