= Packaging engineering =

Broad topic ranging from design conceptualization to product placement

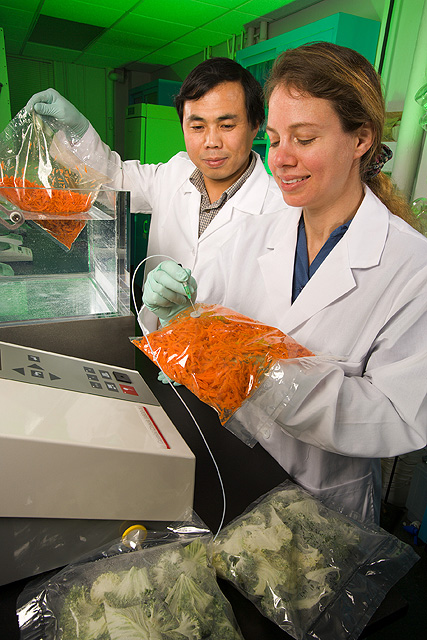
Testing modified atmosphere in a plastic bag of carrots

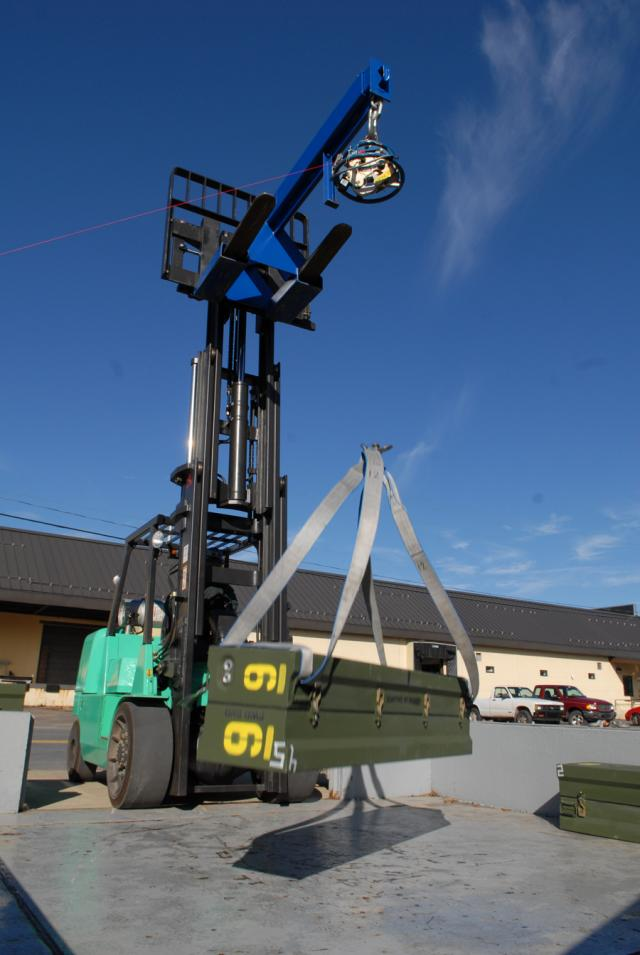
Military shipping container being drop tested

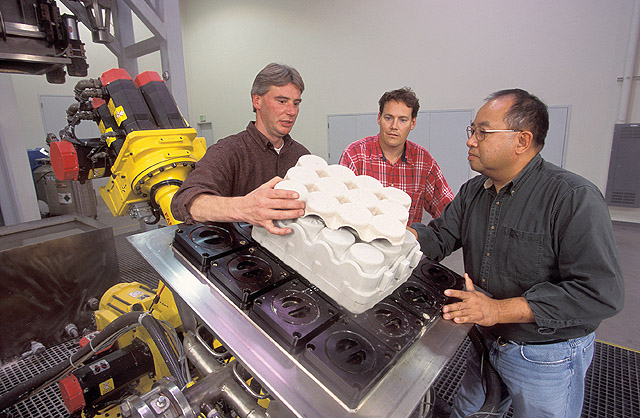
Engineers developing methods of molding packaging components from renewable resources such as straw

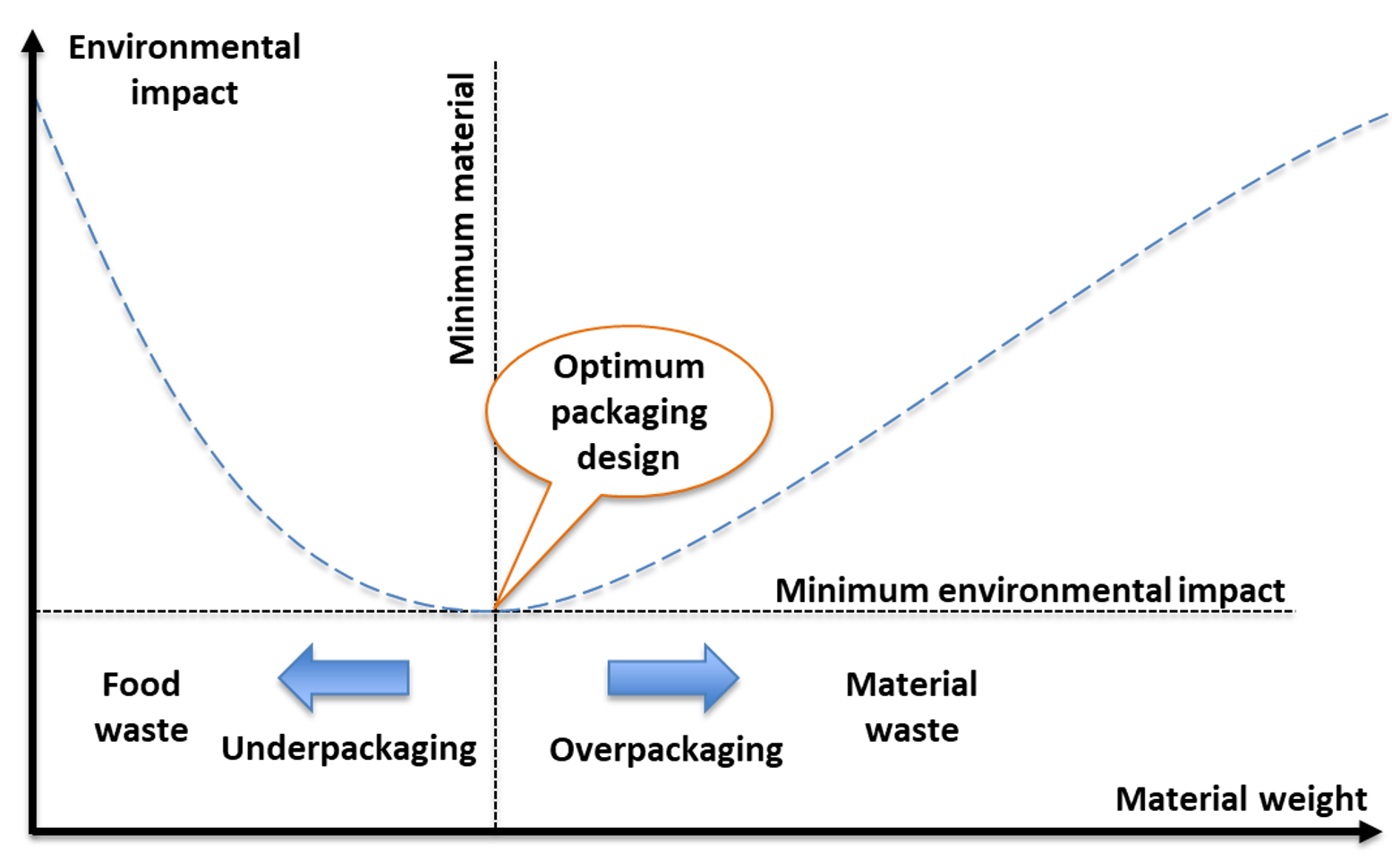
Package design involves interactions of several factors

Packaging engineering, also package engineering, packaging technology and packaging science, is a broad topic ranging from design conceptualization to product placement. All steps along the manufacturing process, and more, must be taken into account in the design of the package for any given product. Package engineering is an interdisciplinary field integrating science, engineering, technology and management to protect and identify products for distribution, storage, sale, and use. It encompasses the process of design, evaluation, and production of packages. It is a system integral to the value chain that impacts product quality, user satisfaction, distribution efficiencies, and safety. Package engineering includes industry-specific aspects of industrial engineering, marketing, materials science, industrial design and logistics. Packaging engineers must interact with research and development, manufacturing, marketing, graphic design, regulatory, purchasing, planning and so on. The package must sell and protect the product, while maintaining an efficient, cost-effective process cycle.

Engineers develop packages from a wide variety of rigid and flexible materials. Some materials have scores or creases to allow controlled folding into package shapes (sometimes resembling origami). Packaging involves extrusion, thermoforming, molding and other processing technologies. Packages are often developed for high speed fabrication, filling, processing, and shipment. Packaging engineers use principles of structural analysis and thermal analysis in their evaluations.

== Education ==
Some packaging engineers have backgrounds in other science, engineering, or design disciplines while some have college degrees specializing in this field.

Formal packaging programs might be listed as package engineering, packaging science, packaging technology, etc. BE, BS, MS, M.Tech and PhD programs are available. Students in a packaging program typically begin with generalized science, business, and engineering classes before progressing into industry-specific topics such as shelf life stability, corrugated box design, cushioning, engineering design, labeling regulations, project management, food safety, robotics, RFID tags, quality management, package testing, packaging machinery, tamper-evident methods, recycling, computer-aided design, etc.

== AI ==
Artificial intelligence is becoming useful in several aspects of packaging development. Packaging engineers are using AI systems in their operations research, project management, graphics, logistics, report writing, plant layout, presentation preparation, and many other types of business and engineering areas.

AI can also design novel packages. For example, the DABUS system designed containers for food and beverages with fractal patterns for gripping and for optical impact. Patent law is developing in this area. A World Patent has been issued with the inventor listed as DABUS but several jurisdictions indicate that a living person must be the inventor.

== See also ==
- Packaging
- Packing problems
- Queueing theory
- Engineering economics
- Manufacturing engineering
- Cutting stock problem
- Bin packing problem
- Integrated circuit packaging and Semiconductor packaging

== Bibliography ==
- Yam, K. L., "Encyclopedia of Packaging Technology", John Wiley & Sons, 2009, ISBN 978-0-470-08704-6
- Hanlon, Kelsey, and Forcinio, "Handbook of Package Engineering", CRC Press, 1998
