= Vertical form fill sealing machine =

System to create and fill plastic bags and pouches

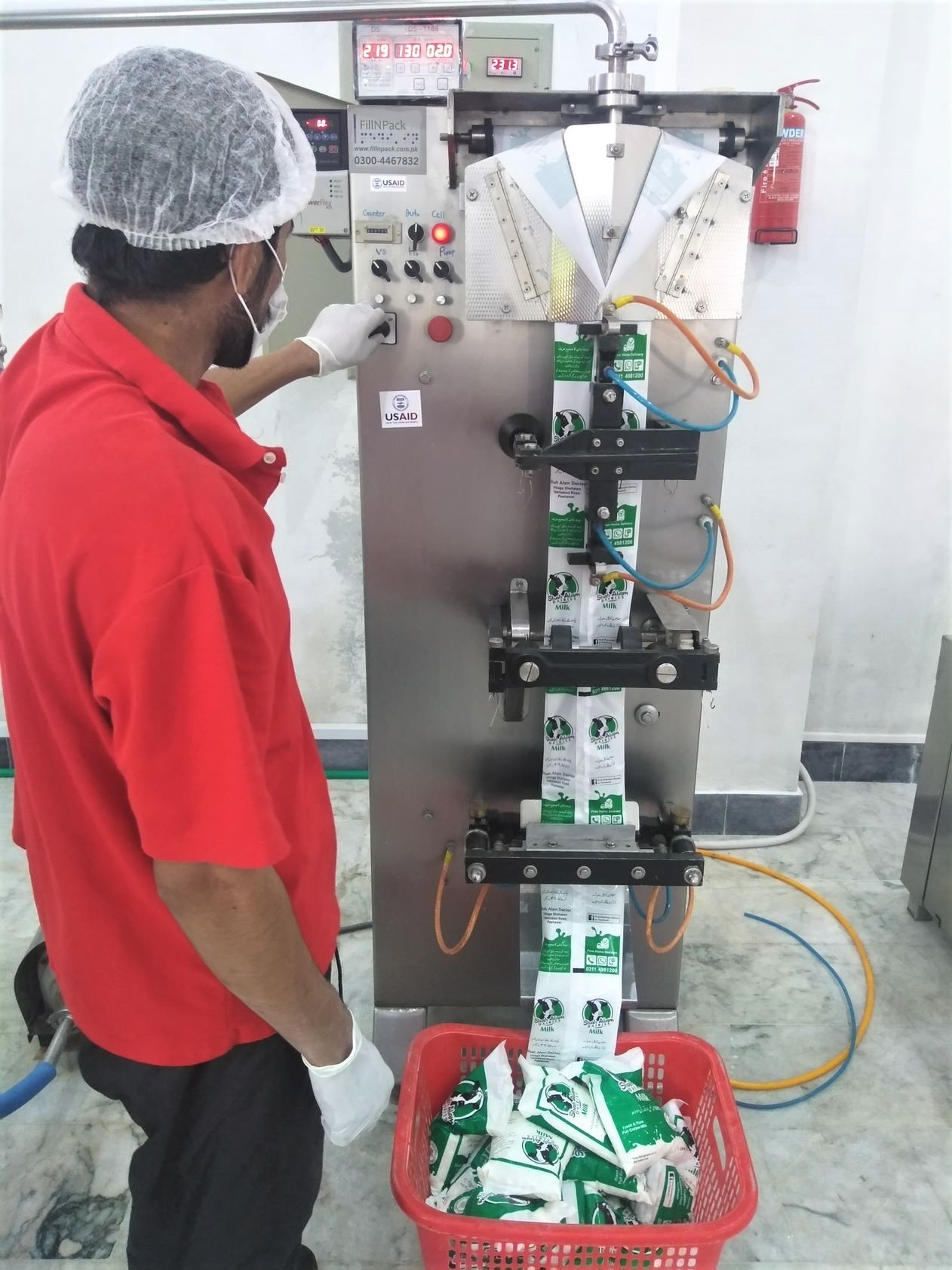
A vertical form-fill-seal (VFFS) machine used for packaging milk in plastic bags

A vertical form fill sealing machine is a type of automated assembly-line product packaging system, commonly used in the packaging industry for food and many other products. Walter Zwoyer, the inventor of the technology, patented his idea for the VFFS machine in 1936 while working with the Henry Heide Candy Company. The machine constructs plastic bags and stand-up pouches out of a flat roll of film, fills them with product, and seals them. Both solids and liquids can be bagged.

== Specifications of machine ==
The typical machine is loaded with a continuous flat roll of plastic film, which has usually had labeling and artwork applied. Plastic is the most commonly used packaging material in the food industry, but the technology can be used to form continuous metallized foil/film, paper, and fabric product containers by changing the edge sealing/seaming methods. For some products the film may first be fed through a sterilizing chemical bath and dryer.

=== Single-web machine systems ===
Vertical or Inclined Form-Fill-Seal Packaging machine

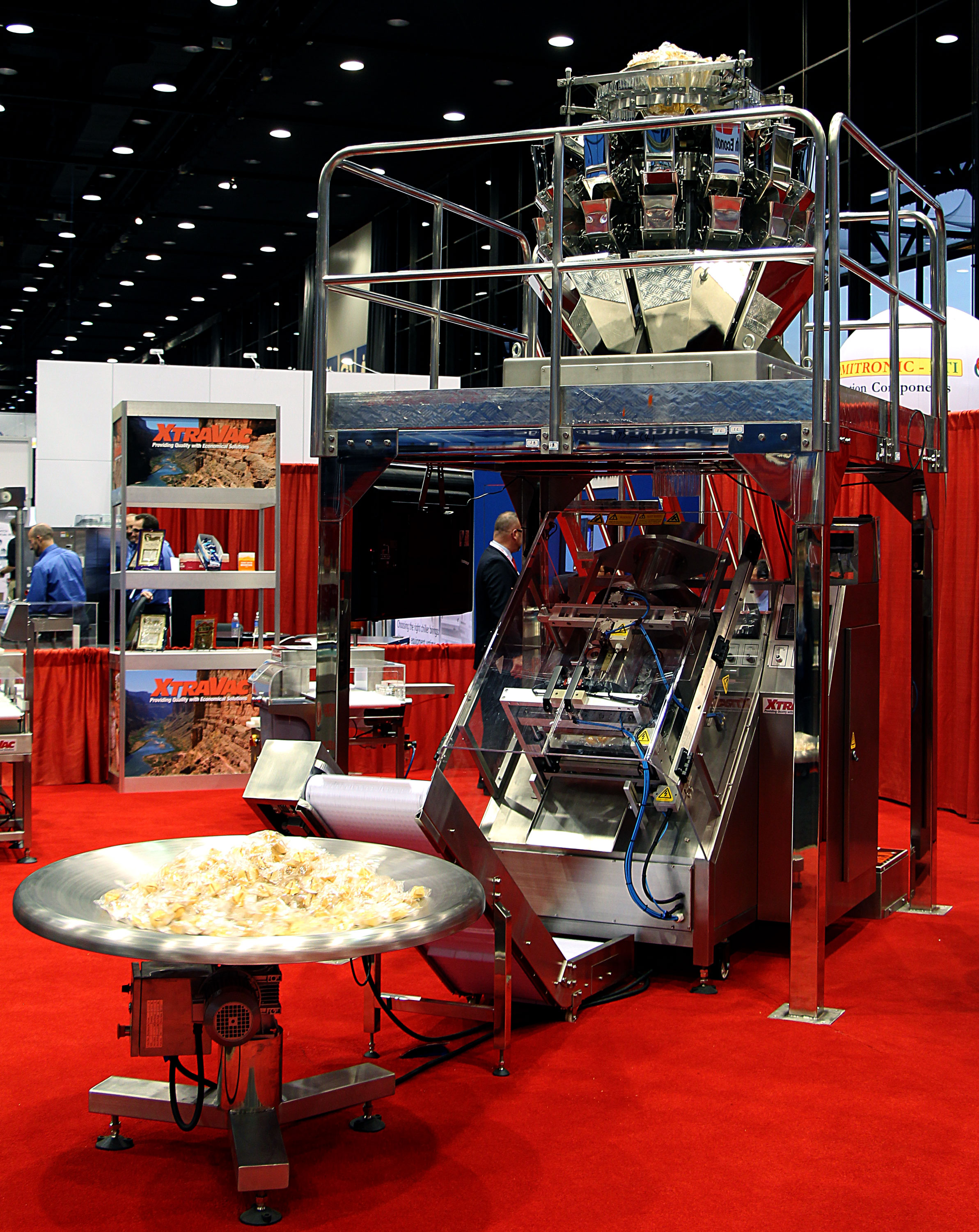
Multihead weigher inclined vertical form fill seal packaging machine with a simple conveyor and rotary catching table

For a vertical form-fill-seal the film approaches the back of a long hollow conical tube, which is called the forming tube. When the center of the plastic is near the tube, the outer edges of the film form flaps that wrap around the conical forming tube. The film is pulled downward around the outside of the tube and a vertical heat-sealing bar clamps onto the edges of the film to create the "fin Seal", bonding the film by melting the seam edges together.

To start the bagging process, a horizontal sealing bar creates the "Bottom Seal" by clamping across the bottom edge of the tube, bonding the film together, and cutting off any film below. This sealing bar can be on a fixed height, which is called an intermittent sealing process. Faster systems include a sealing bar that moves down with the bag while sealing. This is called a continuous process. The product is either pre-measured by a multi-head weighing system or the sealed tube end is then lowered onto a precision weighing table and the product to be bagged is dispensed through the long conical tube in the center of the bag. When the gross weight of the product-filled bag is reached, filling stops, and the horizontal sealing bar seals the top of the bag, simultaneously forming the bottom of the next bag above. This bag is then cut off from the tube and is now a sealed package, ready to advance onward into the product boxing and shipping processes.

During the final sealing process, the bag may be filled with air from a blower or from an inert gas supply such as nitrogen. Inflating the bag helps reduce the crushing of fragile products such as potato chips, while inflating with inert gas drives out oxygen and retards the growth of bacteria that would spoil the product. Other product finishes such as hole punching for retail hanging racks will be done concurrently or just after the "Top Seal" is made.

The feeding of material and cutting of the bag/pouch can be determined either by pouch length, or by indexing to an eyespot (photo registration mark), which is detected by a visual sensor. While single web systems are popular for food applications, the dual web four side seal system is often popular for IVD and Medical device products. Closely related is the horizontal form-fill-seal machine, which generally uses more floor space than a vertical system. Modern advancements in pouch forming technology have allowed for smaller and smaller Vertical pouch forming systems.

Many food-filled packages are filled with inert gas such as nitrogen to extend shelf life without the use of chemicals. Many manufacturers create and control their own nitrogen supply by using on-demand nitrogen generators.

=== Dual-web systems ===
Dual-web systems are available for pouches requiring different materials for each side, or with four sides. Dual-web systems use two rolls of material fed in from opposite sides of the machine. The bottom and sides are heat-sealed together to form the pouch, and the product is loaded from the top. The pouch with the loaded product then advances downwards; the top is sealed and the pouch is cut off. The sealing of the top of the pouch forms the bottom of the next pouch. During this process a tear notch may be punched.

== See also ==
- Filler (packaging)
- Food packaging
