= Jiffy =

Jiffy may refer to:

== Business ==
- Jiffy (convenience store), a convenience store brand in Thailand
- Jiffy Packaging, a British packaging manufacturer
- Jiffy Steamer, an American manufacturer of clothing steamers
- Jiffy mix, a line of baking mixes manufactured by the Chelsea Milling Company

== Other uses ==
- Jiffy (time), one of several different very short periods of time
- Jonathan Davies (rugby, born 1962), nicknamed "Jiffy"

== See also ==
- Jiffy Lube, an American brand of automotive oil change shops
- Jiffy Pop, a brand of popcorn
- "Jiffy lemons", the plastic lemon-shaped containers used to package Jif (lemon juice)
- Jiffy bag, another name for padded envelopes
- Jif (disambiguation)
