= FIJ =

FIJ may refer to:

- Fiji
- Fijian language
- Fellow of the Institute of Journalists
- Juventutem (Latin: Foederatio Internationalis Juventutem), a Roman Catholic youth movement
- Renze Fij (born 1992), Dutch Footballer
- Foundation for Investigative Journalism, Nigerian organisation

== See also ==
- IJF (disambiguation)
- Jif (disambiguation)
