= The Printhouse =

- Company type: Private
- Industry: Printing
- Founded: 1995
- Headquarters: Palatine, Illinois
- Area served: Continental [United States]
- Key people: Robert G. Canfield
- Products: Commercial print, folding carton
- Website: printhouseUS.com

The Printhouse is an American company headquartered in the Chicago suburb of Palatine, Illinois. The Printhouse was formed when a company, Qualay International changed names in 1995 to The Printhouse. They are a provider of commercial printing and paperboard packaging. The Printhouse has designed a unique, fully online proofing system. This proofing method includes QR codes.

== Industries Served ==
Publishing, logistics, manufacturing, educational testing, church pension, transportation, automotive parts, fitness, oil & refining, advertising, heating and air-conditioning, financial planning, insurance, legal, accounting, wedding gowns, floral wholesale, banking.
