= IJF =

IJF or Ijf may refer to:

- International Journalism Festival, annual journalism festival in Italy
- Investigative Journalism Foundation, Canadian organisation
- Internacia Junulara Festivalo, annual Esperanto festival in Italy
- International Judo Federation
- IJf Blokker (born 1930), Dutch actor

== See also ==
- FIJ (disambiguation)
- Jif (disambiguation)
