= Northern vigor =

Northern vigor is an effect seen in certain varieties of produce where varieties of plants grown in northern climates, then moved to southern climates, are hardier, better-producing, and better tasting. This effect has been primarily observed in potatoes, but is also seen in strawberries and garlic. The Saskatchewan Seed Potato Growers Association has trademarked the term "Northern Vigour" for use with their potatoes, but the effect is seen in produce grown throughout Canada and the northern United States.

The exact cause of northern vigor is not known, but there are many theories. Some believe it has to do with the length of the days in northern latitudes, or that it has to do with the combination of cold nights and hot days. Others believe that the cold may kill off any disease that would otherwise affect plants from the south. Still others think that the switch from a colder climate to a warm, less harsh environment makes it easier for the plants to thrive. Researchers in Saskatchewan discovered that tubers raised in the cold and then moved to a warm environment undergo a series of physiological changes that may trigger more vigorous growth.
