= Producer Responsibility Obligations (Packaging Waste) Regulations 2007 =

UK waste management regulations

The Producer Responsibility Obligations (Packaging Waste) Regulations 2007, which originally came into effect at the end of August 1997 in Great Britain and in 1999 in Northern Ireland, was the first producer responsibility legislation in the UK.

The Packaging Waste Regulations work on the principle of Collective Producer Responsibility, obliging producers of packaging to take responsibility for their environmental impact. The regulations require obligated producers to pay a proportion of the cost of the recovery and recycling of their packaging.

The Packaging Waste Regulations have since been replaced by the UK's Extended Producer Responsibility (EPR) for packaging scheme, introduced from 2023 onwards. The new system places greater responsibility on producers by requiring them to cover the full net costs of collecting, sorting and recycling household packaging waste.

Under EPR, producers must also report more detailed packaging data, while fees are designed to encourage the use of packaging that is easier to recycle. The reforms form part of the government's wider Resources and Waste Strategy and are intended to increase recycling rates, reduce unnecessary packaging and shift the costs of waste management from local authorities to the businesses that place packaging on the market.

== Proportions ==
Companies must show that they have paid for their obligation for recovery and recycling of the packaging. This is achieved through the Packaging Recovery Note (PRN) System.

Under the Packaging Waste Regulations the so-called 'packaging chain' is divided into four activities, each with a different percentage responsibility:

- raw material manufacturer: 6% - manufacturing of packaging raw material, e.g. manufacturer of steel for baked beans cans.
- converter: 9% - manufacturing of a recognised packaging item, e.g. manufacturer of the steel can for the baked beans.
- packer/filler: 37% - putting a product into packaging or applying packaging to a product, e.g. the company which fills the can with baked beans.
- seller: 48% - supplying the packaging to the end user of that packaging, e.g. the supermarket which sells the baked bean can to the consumer, or the wholesaler who sells boxed cans of beans would have the selling obligation on the boxes removed by the supermarket.

Companies who directly import packaging, packaged goods or packaging materials are similarly obligated. The level of their obligation depends on the stage of the chain at which the packaging is brought into the UK but, in every case, they pick up the rolled-up obligations for all stages carried out before the packaging or packaging materials reach the UK.

== The PRN System ==
The legislation stipulates that companies who are obligated under the Regulations must prove they have paid for the requisite number of tonnes to be recovered each year. Reprocessors are licensed to issue a Packaging Recovery Note (PRN), or PERNs for exported packaging, for each tonne of specific material they have recovered. Regulated companies must buy the appropriate quantity of PRNs for the appropriate materials as proof they have fulfilled their obligations. For a percentage of each tonne of packaging waste generated, a PRN is required as proof that a tonne of that material (wood, paper, glass, plastic, aluminium or steel) has been recycled. The price of PRNs is set by the reprocessors according to the availability of material being recycled. Thus PRNs have joined the commodities marketplace.

A company falls under the legislation if it has a turnover of more than £2 million and handled more than 50 tonnes of packaging in the previous calendar year.

PRNs are certificates issued by accredited reprocessors when packaging waste is recycled or recovered. These PRNs are put onto the open market to be purchased by obligated companies as evidence that they have met their calculated obligation. This can be done directly or through a "compliance scheme", of which there are several available. A suitable compliance scheme must be registered. The role of a compliance scheme is to support its members with registering with the relevant environmental regulator, provide evidence of compliance and submit an annual certificate of compliance on their behalf.

== See also ==
- Extended producer responsibility
