= Packaging Recovery Note =

A Packaging Recovery Note (PRN) is a type of document that provides evidence waste packaging material has been recycled into a new product. They form a key part of the Producer Responsibility Obligations (Packaging Waste) Regulations 2007 which covers Great Britain.

Packaging Recovery Notes can be issued by accredited reprocessors when they have recovered and recycled a tonne of packaging material. The accredited reprocessor can sell the Packaging Recovery Note to obligated companies or Compliance Schemes who use the Packaging Recovery Note to prove that a tonne of packaging material has been recycled on their behalf, or their members behalf.

== Packaging Export Recovery Note ==
A Packaging Export Recovery Note (PERN) can be issued by an accredited exporter for each tonne of waste packaging material that has been exported overseas. When packaging waste is exported overseas the facilities must operate to a standard set by those in Great Britain.

== NPWD ==
The National Packaging Waste Database (NPWD) is a web-based database operated by the Environment Agency, Department for Environment, Food and Rural Affairs, the Scottish Environment Protection Agency (SEPA), the Northern Ireland Environment Agency and the Advisory Committee on Packaging. The database allows the electronic issuing of Packaging Recovery Notes and submission of quarterly returns by reprocessors and exporters. Packaging Recovery Notes were originally issued in paper format, however following a number of cases of fraud in the Packaging Recovery Note system the National Packaging Waste Database was developed to phase out paper based reporting. From September 2007 all Packaging Recovery Notes must be issued electronically and the name of the obligated company or compliance scheme to whom the Packaging Recovery Note is issued is registered on the NPWD.

== Compliance schemes ==
Packaging waste compliance schemes purchase Packaging Recovery Notes on their members’ behalf, such that a scheme's aggregated obligation in a given registration year is met. Since the inception of the National Packaging Waste Database (NPWD) in 2007, all PRNs and PERNs are issued electronically. Schemes and brokers must acquire PRN evidence on behalf of either their aggregated obligation in the case of a scheme or a specific obligated producer in the case of a broker. Either the name of the scheme or the obligated producer must be included on the PRN/PERN as recipient. This approach has been established to ensure a more predictable market and to prevent the speculative acquisition of evidence.

== PRN trading ==
To allow a central location for the buying and selling of Packaging Recovery Notes and Packaging Export Recovery Notes, The Environment Exchange was launched in 1998, which serves as the industry's price index and trading platform. Since then, alternative platforms have entered the market such as Clarity Environmental in 2002 Clarity Environmental, SCM Environmental and PRN Runner, launched in 2010. These websites allow accredited reprocessors to post details of Packaging Recovery Notes they can issue from the tonnage of waste packaging material they have registered on the National Packaging Waste Database. Obligated companies and compliance schemes can purchase these Packaging Recovery Notes direct from the accredited reprocessor or post details of Packaging Recovery Notes they require to fulfill their obligations under the Producer Responsibility Obligations (Packaging Waste) Regulations 2007
