= Cartoning machine =

Packaging machine that forms cartons

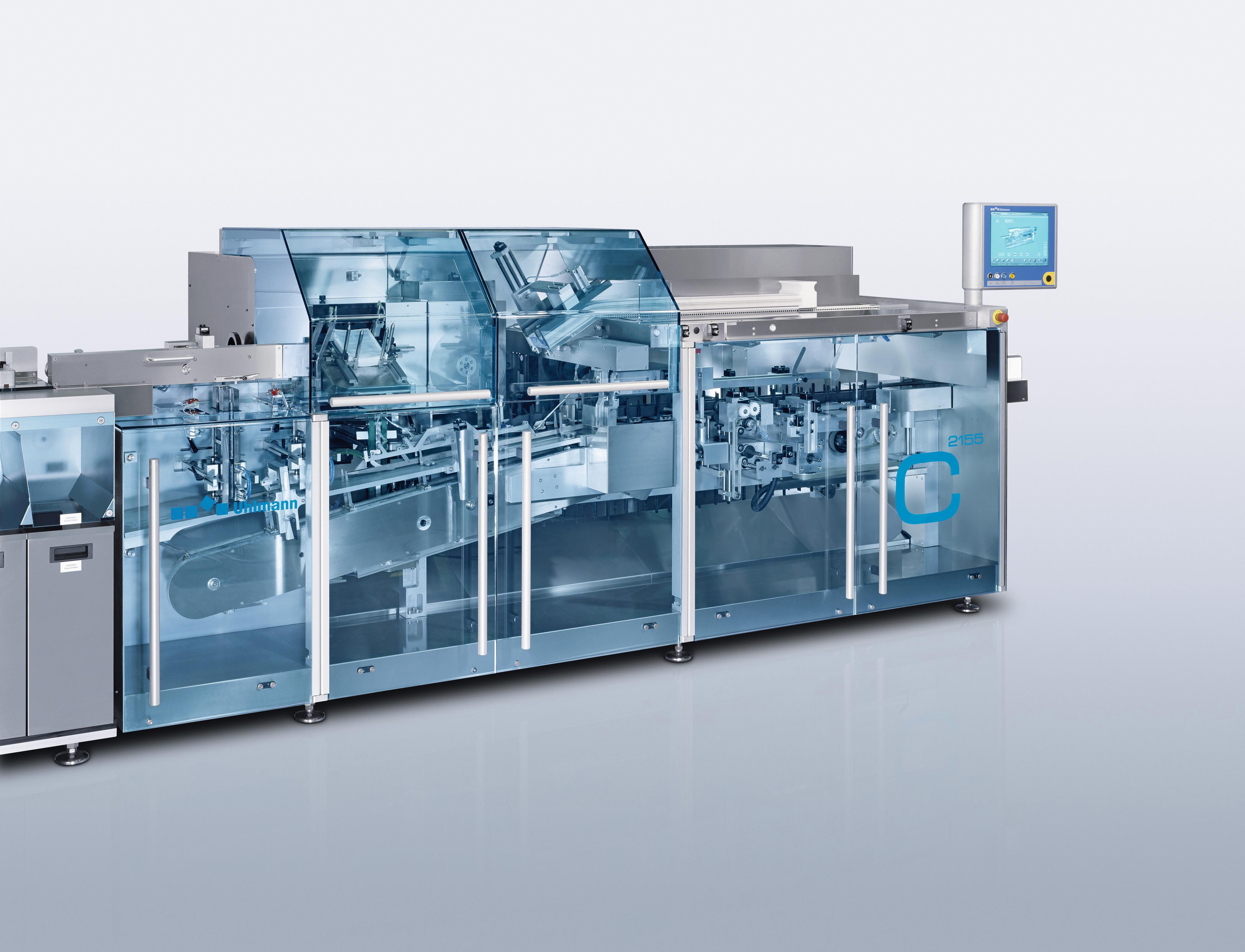
Uhlman cartoner capable of 150 cartons per minute

A cartoning machine or cartoner, is a packaging machine that forms cartons: erect, close, folded, side seamed and sealed cartons.

Packaging machines which form a carton board blank into a carton filled with a product or bag of products or number of products say into single carton, after the filling, the machine engages its tabs / slots to apply adhesive and close both the ends of carton completely sealing the carton.

== Types ==
Cartoning machines can be divided into two types:

- Horizontal cartoning machines
- Vertical cartoning machines

A cartoning machine which picks a single piece from stack of folded carton and erects it, fills with a product or bag of products or number of products horizontally through an open end and closes by tucking the end flaps of the carton or applying glue or adhesive. The product might be pushed in the carton either through the mechanical sleeve or by pressurized air. For many applications however, the products are inserted into the carton manually. This type of Cartoning machine is widely used for packaging foodstuffs, confectionery, medicine, cosmetics, sundry goods, etc.

A cartoning machine which erects a folded carton, fills with a product or number of products vertically through an open end and closes by either tucking the end flaps of the carton or applying glue or adhesive, is called an end load cartoning machine. Cartoning machines are widely used for packaging bottled foodstuffs, confectionery, medicine, cosmetics, etc., and can vary based on the scale of business.

== Carton interface ==
The machinery needs to be able to consistently form, fill, and seal the specific carton of interest. Several factors might come into play: carton design, size, surface of carton, humidity, type of adhesive, stiffness, type of score, etc. Some board factors can be simulated; others might need a finite element analysis or an experimental process capability study.

== See also ==
- Folding carton
