= Produce =

Group of farm-produced crops and goods

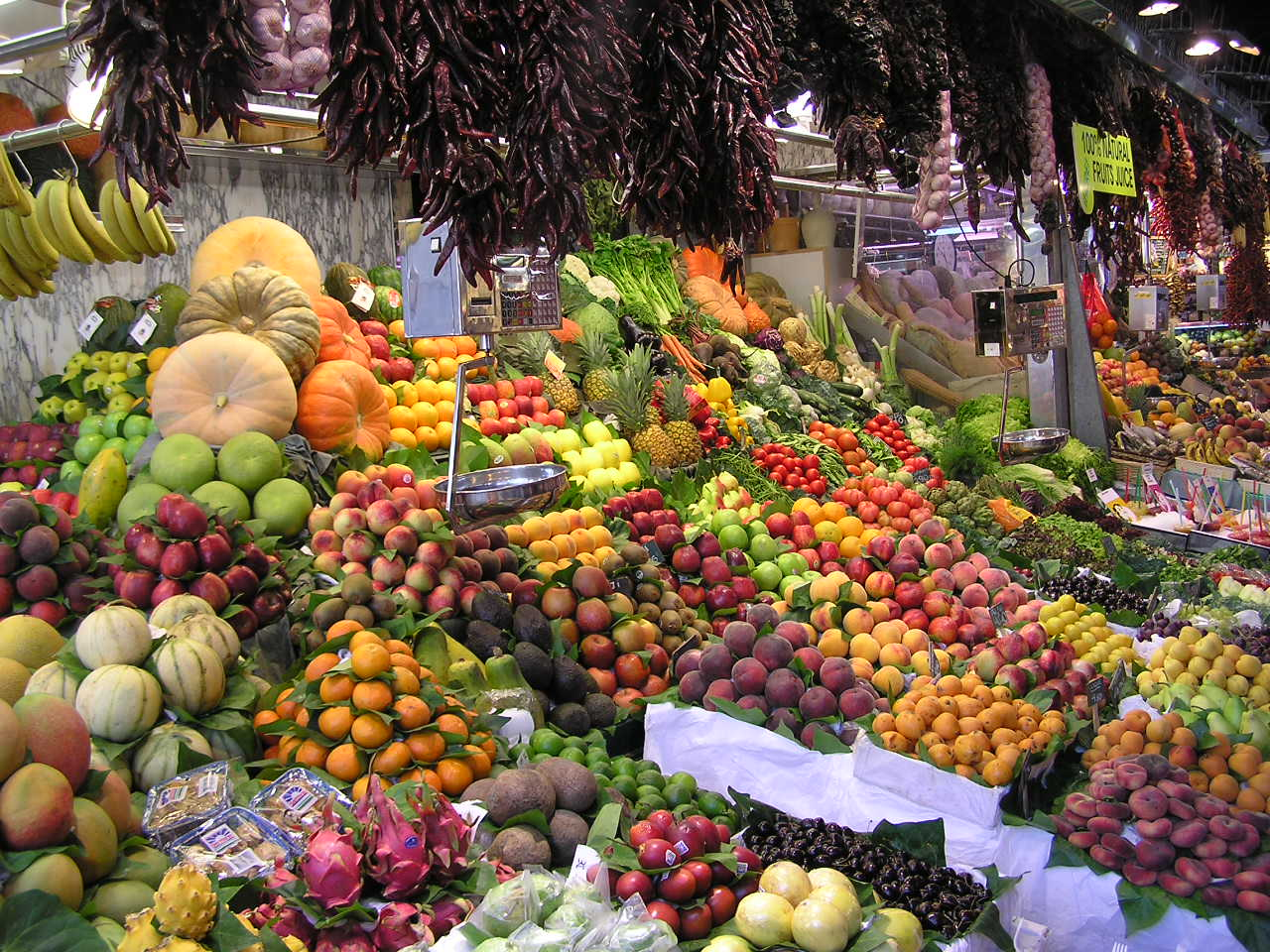
Produce on display at La Boqueria market in Barcelona, Spain

In American English, produce generally refers to fresh fruits and vegetables intended to be eaten by humans, although other food products such as dairy products or nuts are sometimes included. In other English usage, the term "greens" is often used.

In supermarkets, the term is also used to refer to the section of the store where fruit and vegetables are kept. Produce is the main product sold by greengrocers (UK, Australia) and farmers' markets. The term "produce" is widely and commonly used in the U.S. and Canada, but is not typically used outside the agricultural sector in other English-speaking countries.

== Packaging ==
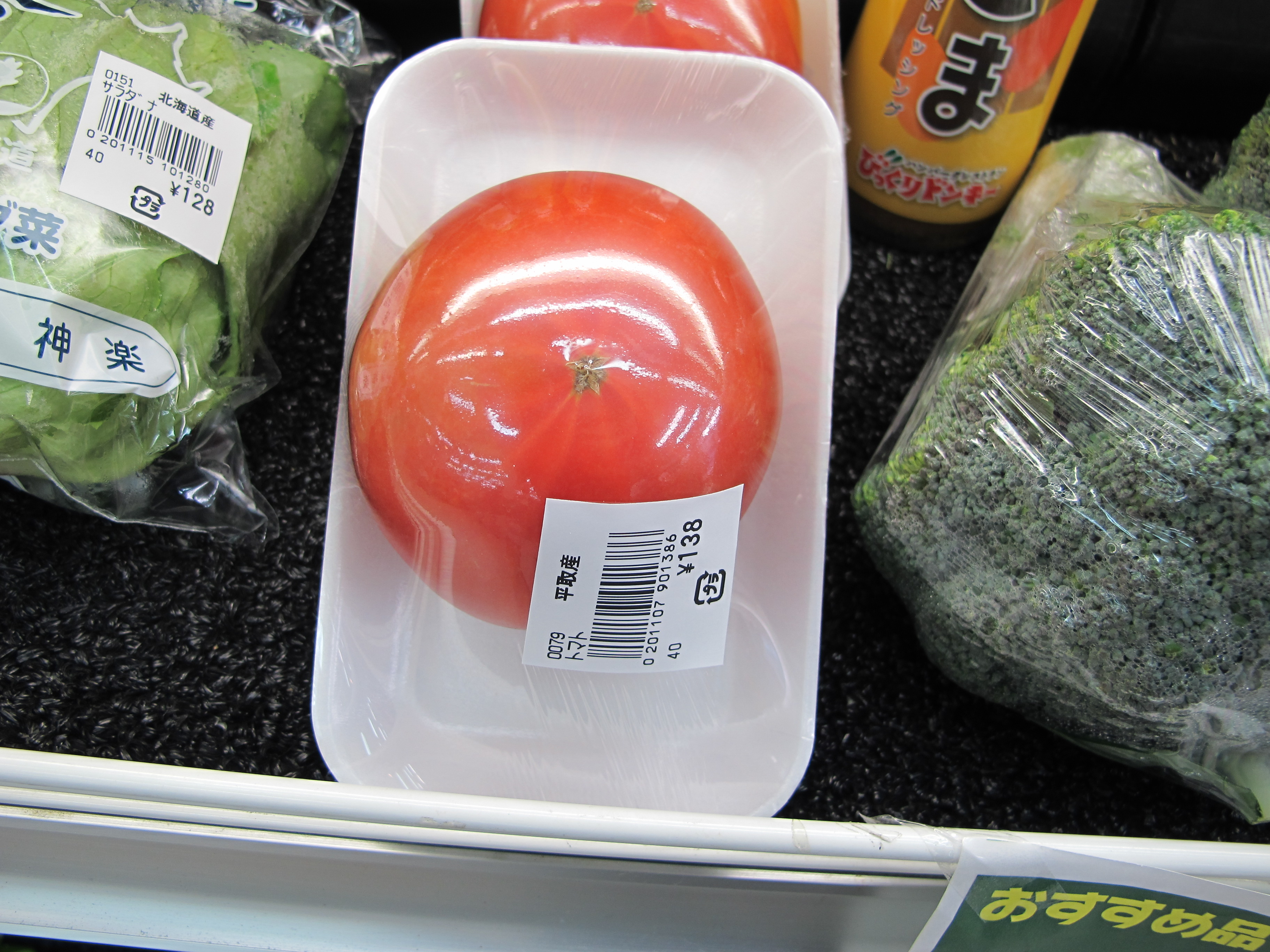
A tomato in a Japanese supermarket on a plastic tray in plastic shrink film

Produce may be packaged for transport or sale. Excessive unnecessary packaging of produce is overpackaging.

In parts of the world, including the U.S. and Europe, loose pieces of produce, such as apples, may be individually marked with small stickers bearing price look-up codes. These four- or five-digit codes are a standardized system intended to aid checkout and inventory control at places where produce is sold.

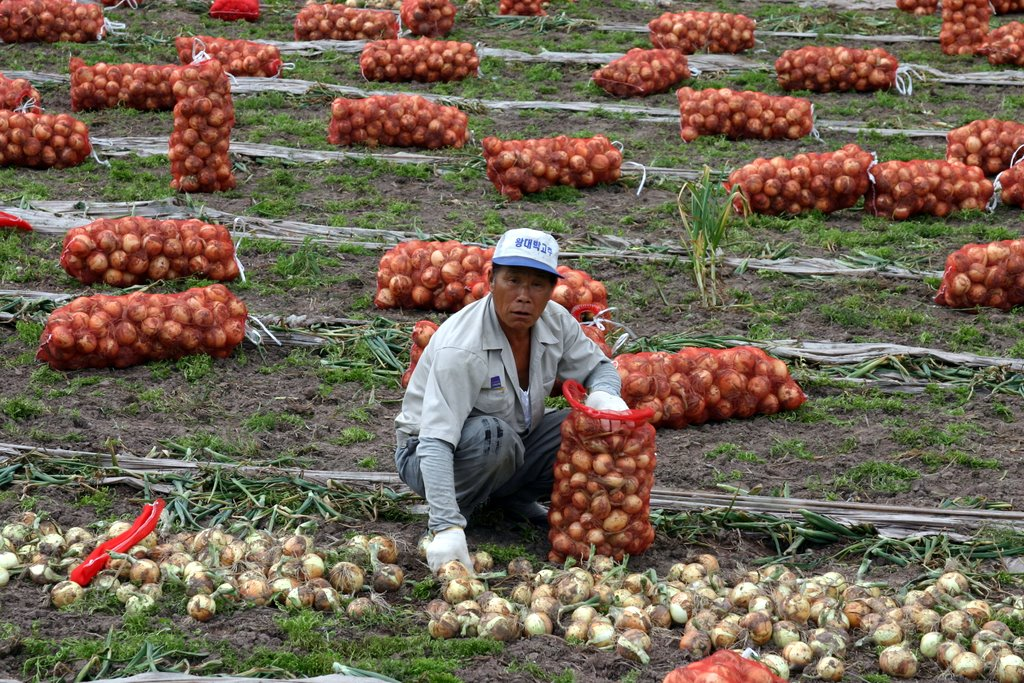
Produce may be bagged in the field during harvest.

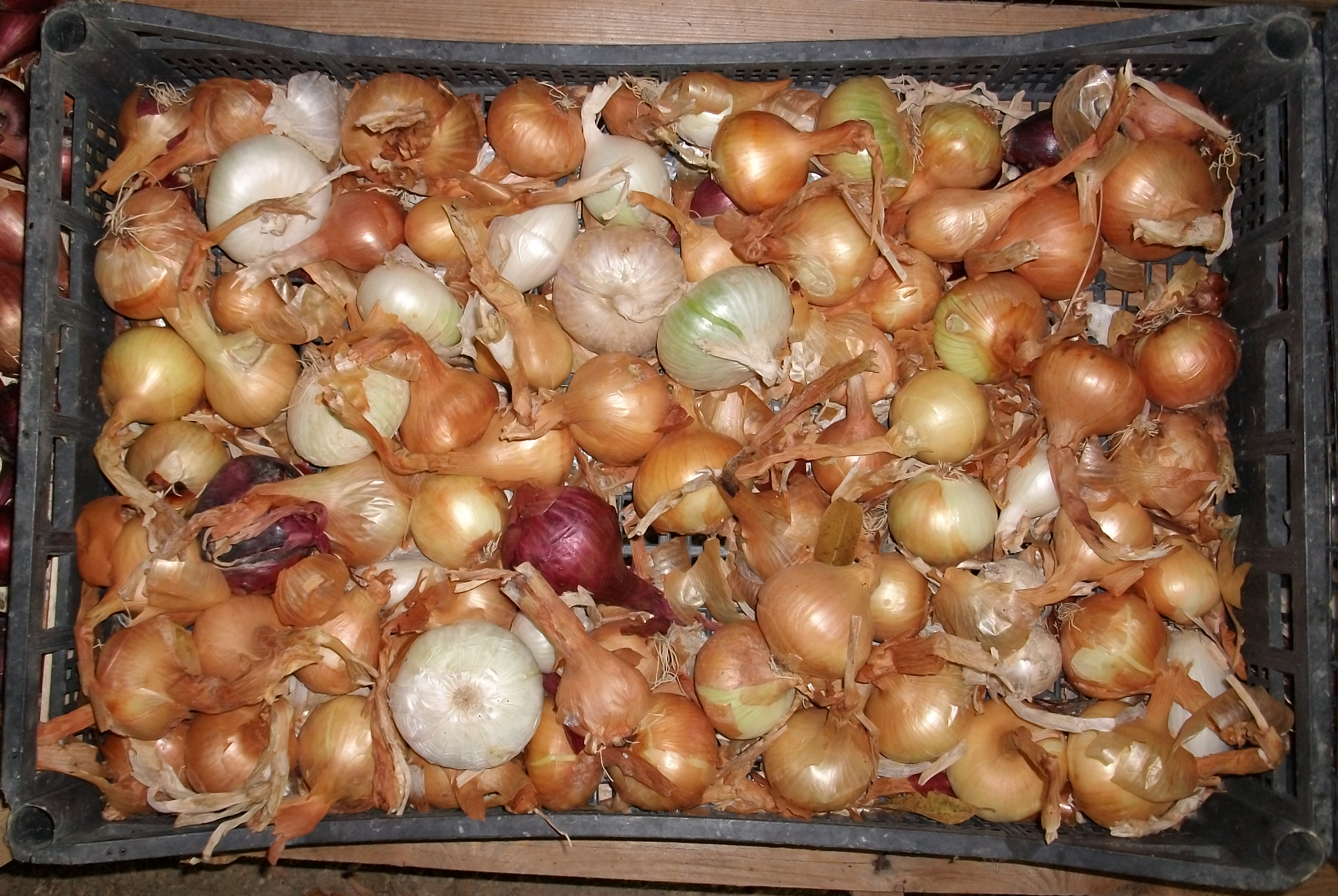
Produce may be packaged for transport in a plastic crate.

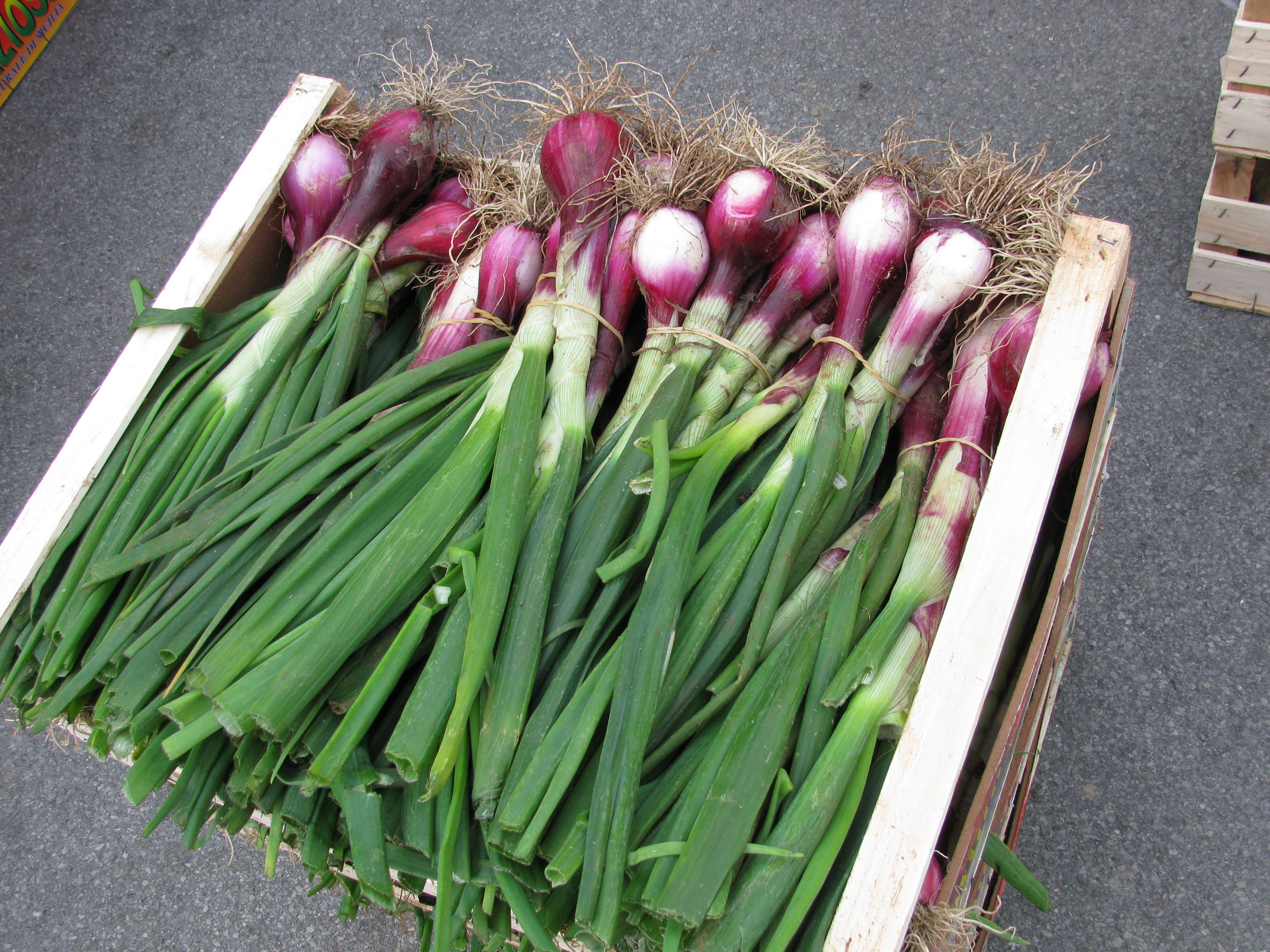
Wooden boxes for bulk produce

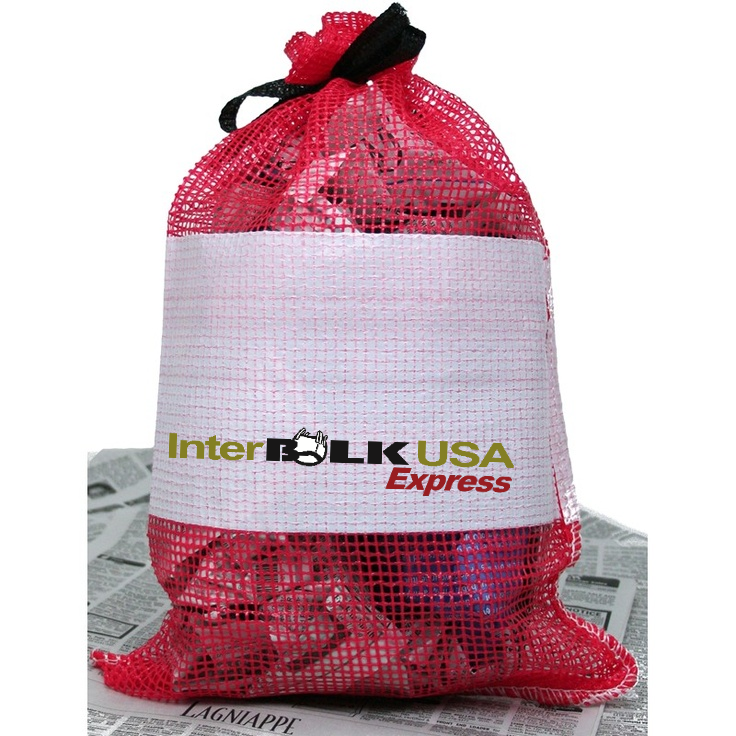
Mesh bag used for retail sales

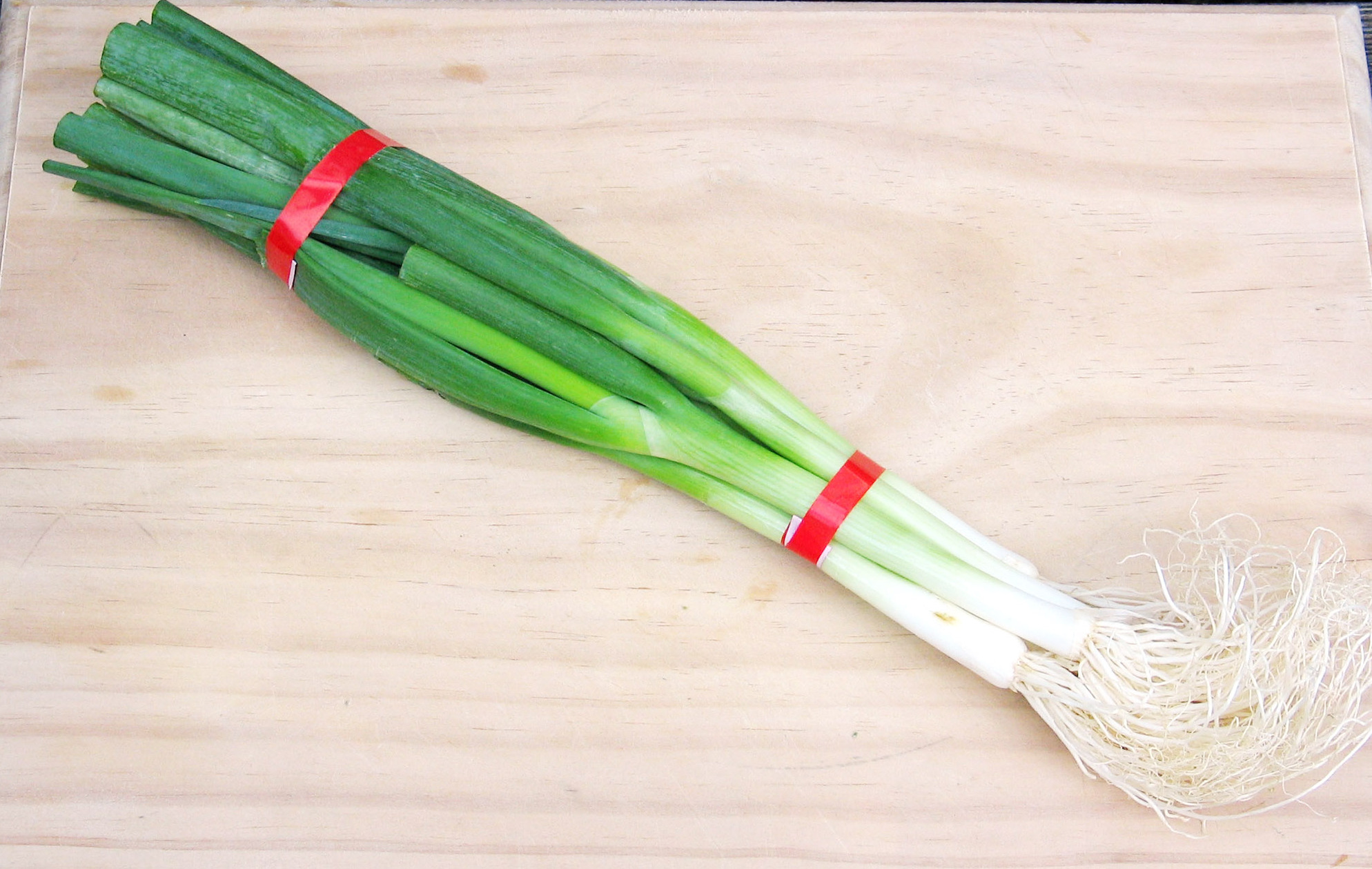
Small amounts may be banded together.

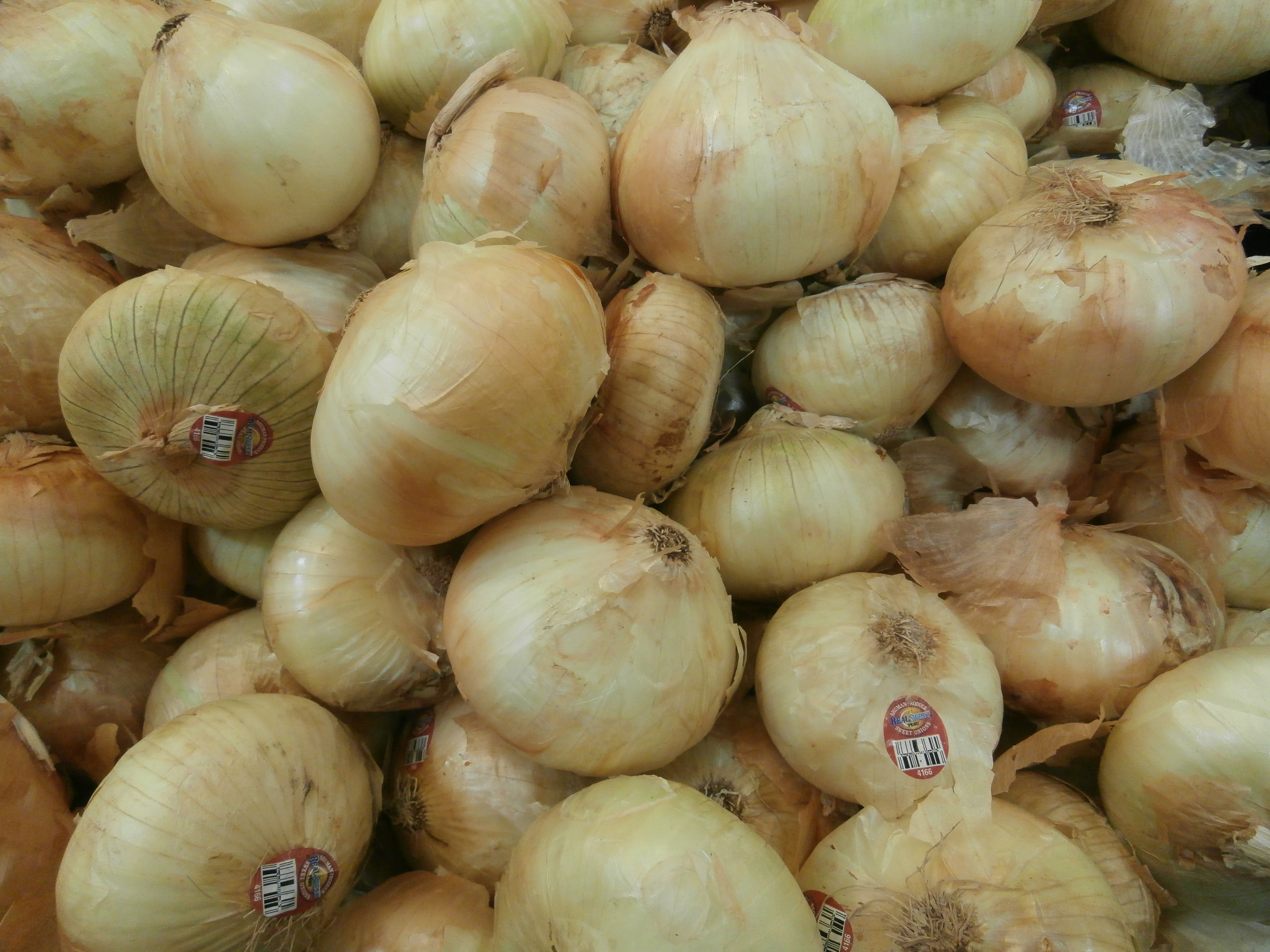
Bulk produce may be identified by stickers

== Bacterial contamination ==
Raw sprouts are among the produce most at risk of bacterial infection.

Rinsing is an effective way to reduce the bacteria count on produce, reducing it to about 10 percent of its previous level.

Wastewater used on vegetables can be a source of contamination, due to contamination with fecal matter, salmonella or other bacteria. After Denmark eliminated salmonella in its chickens, attention has turned to vegetables as a source of illness due to feces contamination from other animal sources, such as pigs.

== See also ==
- Food industry
- Food labeling regulations
- Food traceability
- Geography of food
- Produce traceability

=== Notable people ===
- Frieda Rapoport Caplan
- James Dole
