= Overpackaging =

Use of excess packaging

Overpackaging is the use of excess packaging. The Institute of Packaging Professionals defines it as "a condition where the methods and materials used to package an item exceed the requirements for adequate containment, protection, transport, and sale". It aligns with the hierarchy principle of reduce, rescue, recycle, prioritizing the elimination of unnecessary package.

Reducing overpackaging is a key strategy in source reduction, which aims to minimize waste before it is generated. It aligns with the waste hierarchy principle of reduce, reuse, recycle, where eliminating unnecessary packaging takes precedence over recycling or disposal. In some cases, the degree of excessive packaging is quite obvious; while in others, whether it is excessive packaging or not may be subject to dispute depending on the assessment criteria.

For example, luxury packaging frequently uses more packaging than the minimum requirements. The enterprises hold that additional packaging is beneficial for protecting the products and enhancing their sales appeal. It can convey the brand concept, boost the visual appeal of the products, and increase the sense of ritual when consumers purchase luxury goods. Gift wrapping traditionally involves additional layers, though consumer preferences and cultural practices sustain its use. Decorative packaging boxes incorporate artistic design elements. The function of such boxes goes beyond the basic requirements of product protection or transportation; instead, they can better create a sense of ceremony.

== Excess packaging by design ==
Thin carton of breakfast cereal: designed intentionally with an inefficient shape, adding to packaging waste

An example of a wasteful package design is a breakfast cereal box (some other products also). This is typically a folding carton enclosing a plastic bag of cereal. Cartons are frequently tall and wide but very thin. This has a poor material to volume ratio and is inefficient and wasteful. Package designers are aware of this opportunity to save packaging costs, materials, and waste but marketing and merchandising people want the "billboard" style package for advertising and graphics. An optimized folding carton would use much less paperboard for the same volume of cereal, but with reduced room for graphics. Use of only a resealable plastic bag would use even less material per unit of cereal; of course, even that option results with an empty plastic bag to discard.

The amount of paperboard in a folding carton blank is the sum of the area of all faces of the carton plus the area of the inner flaps, plus a glued lap. This area can be compared to the volume of the carton by a ratio for a measure of efficiency. Depending on the specific design and choice of length, width, and height, this efficiency can vary significantly.

== Underfilled packages ==
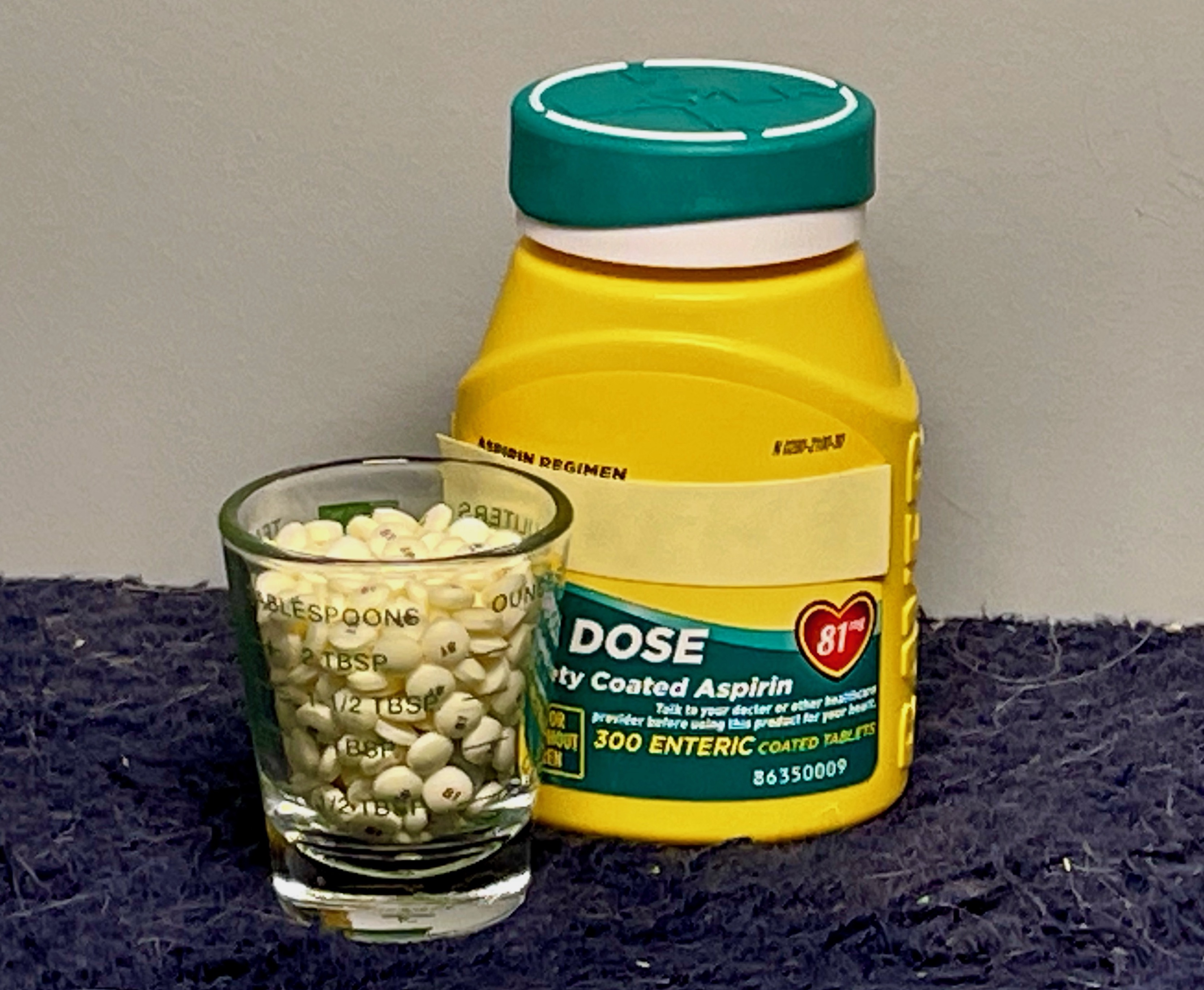
The 300 aspirin tablets take up less than a quarter of the container they came in. Using an appropriately-sized container would minimise packaging waste. （Without considering the efficacy and safety of the product）

Underfilled packaging (Slack-fill packaging) refers to the design of packaging containers with internal volumes significantly exceeding the actual space required for the product, resulting in non-functional empty areas. The U.S. Food and Drug Administration (FDA) has defined six permissible reasons for functional underfilling in packaging: additional space required to protect contents; extra space necessitated by machinery requirements related to the packaged product; additional space resulting from natural settling of products during transportation; packaging-related space needed to facilitate food preparation or consumption; reusable containers with extra space (which helps display contents and maintains significant value after product use - including food containers, promotional items, commemorative durable containers, and gift sets); and additional space resulting from the inability to increase fill quantity or reduce package size due to food labeling requirements, tamper-evident features, or efforts to facilitate handling or prevent theft. The FDA considers packaging to be misleading if manufacturers fail to adequately fill packages for reasons other than those specified above.

== E-commerce ==
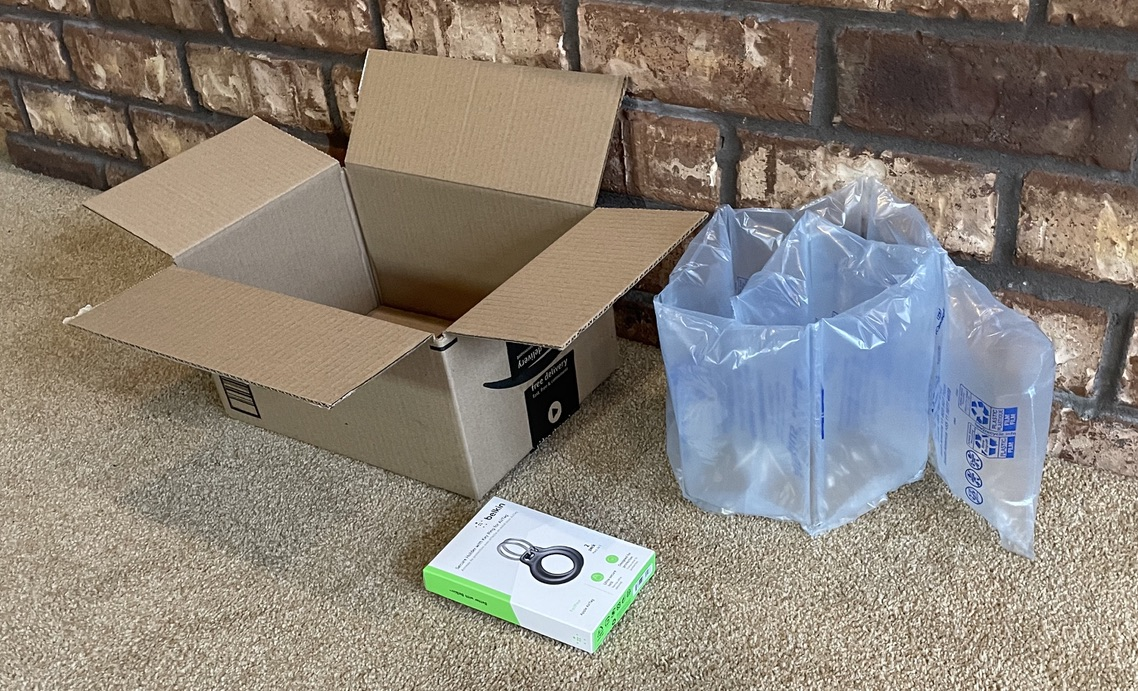
Delivery of a small item in a much larger corrugated box, requiring air pillows for void-fill. A simple padded mailer would have been adequate.

In E-commerce, "the overpackaging of products has become a major ecological concern" Sometimes a package is properly designed to present its contents at a retail store; packaging is minimal. With online shopping or E-commerce, however, items packed for retail sale need to be shipped individually by the e-tailer or by a fulfillment house. The individual package is shipped and handled by package delivery or small parcel carriers. Retail packages are frequently packed into a larger corrugated box for shipment. Often these secondary boxes are much larger than needed, thus use void-fill to immobilize the contents. This can have the appearance of gross overpackaging.

If the product manufacturer designed all packaging to meet the requirements of individual shipment, then the portion sold at a retail store would have excessive packaging.

With fragile items such as consumer electronics, engineers try to match the fragility of the product with the expected stresses of distribution handling. Package cushioning is used to help ensure safe delivery of the product. With overpackaging, excessive cushioning and a larger corrugated box are used: wasteful packaging.

Sometimes two levels of packaging are needed for separate distribution: one for palletize shipment to retail stores and the other designed for individual delivery to households, which results in production inefficiency. New package designs are sometimes called for.

== Food overwraps ==
Fresh produce is usually presented for sale without packages, allowing shoppers to touch the items and choose which ones to buy. Some foods are over wrapped with shrink film, individually bagged, or further protected to increase the appeal to some customers. However, there are different opinions and discussions on whether the additional packaging of fresh agricultural products is necessary.

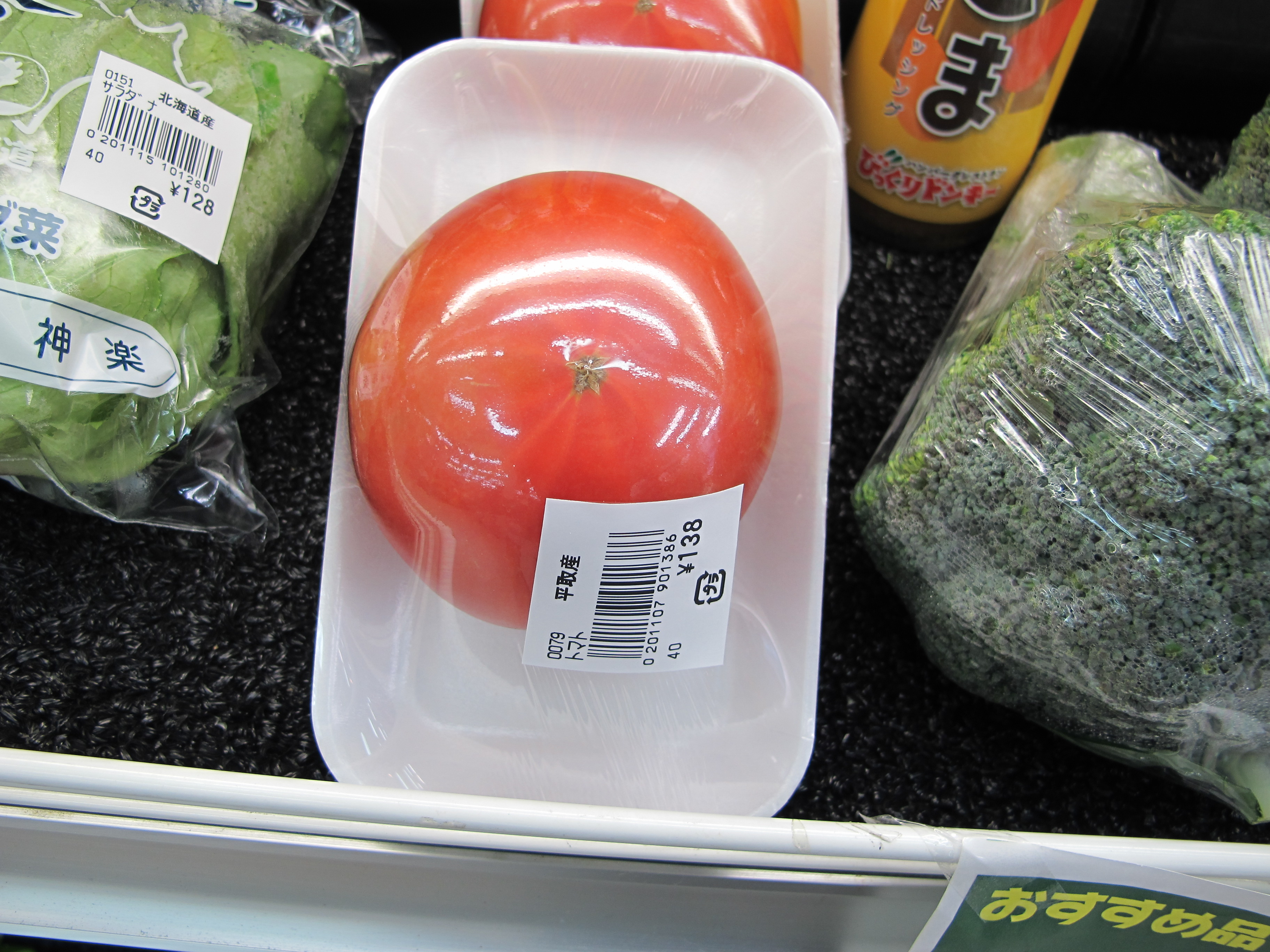
A tomato on a plastic tray and with a plastic shrink film

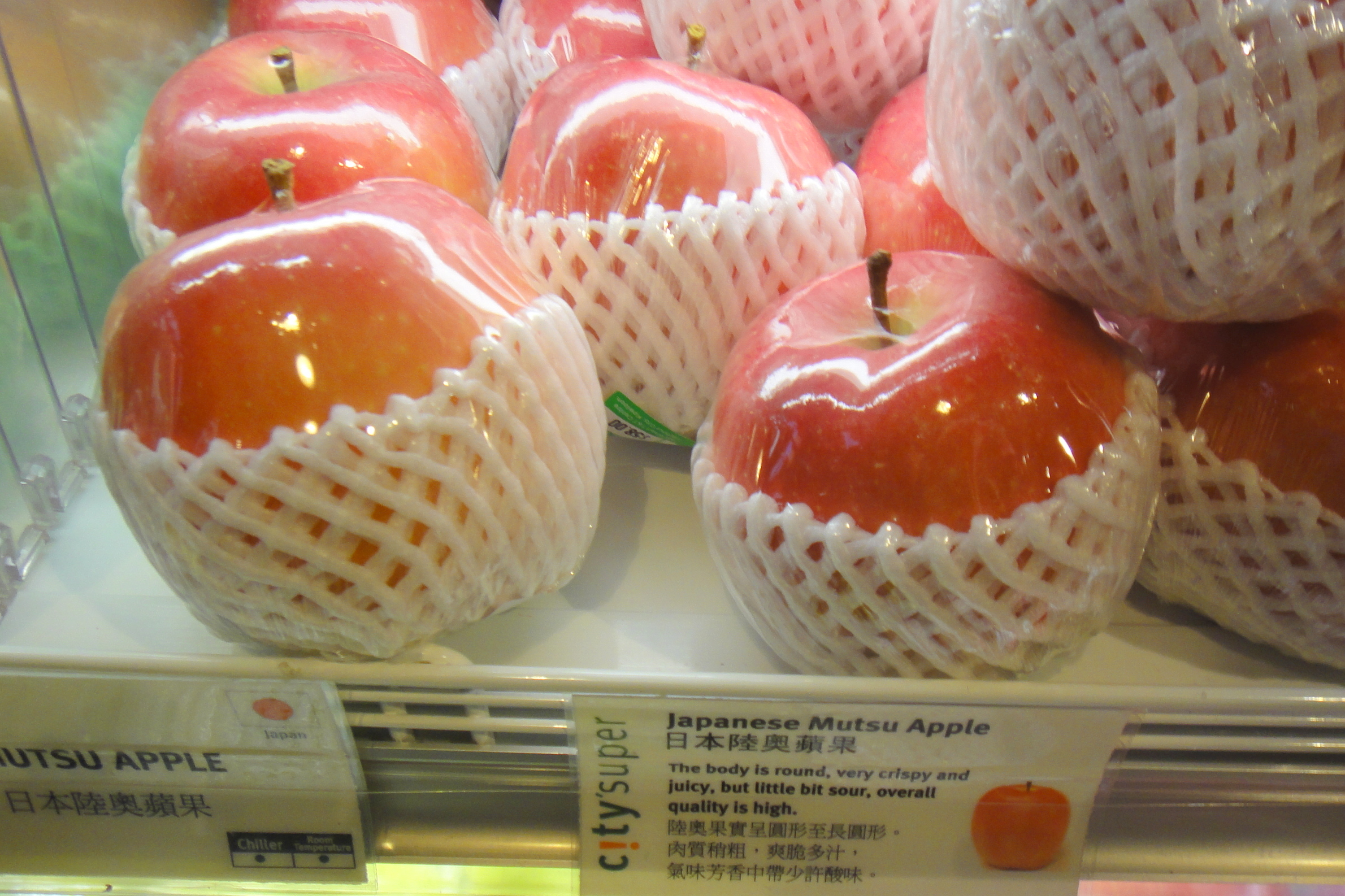
Apples in shrink film and foam cushioning

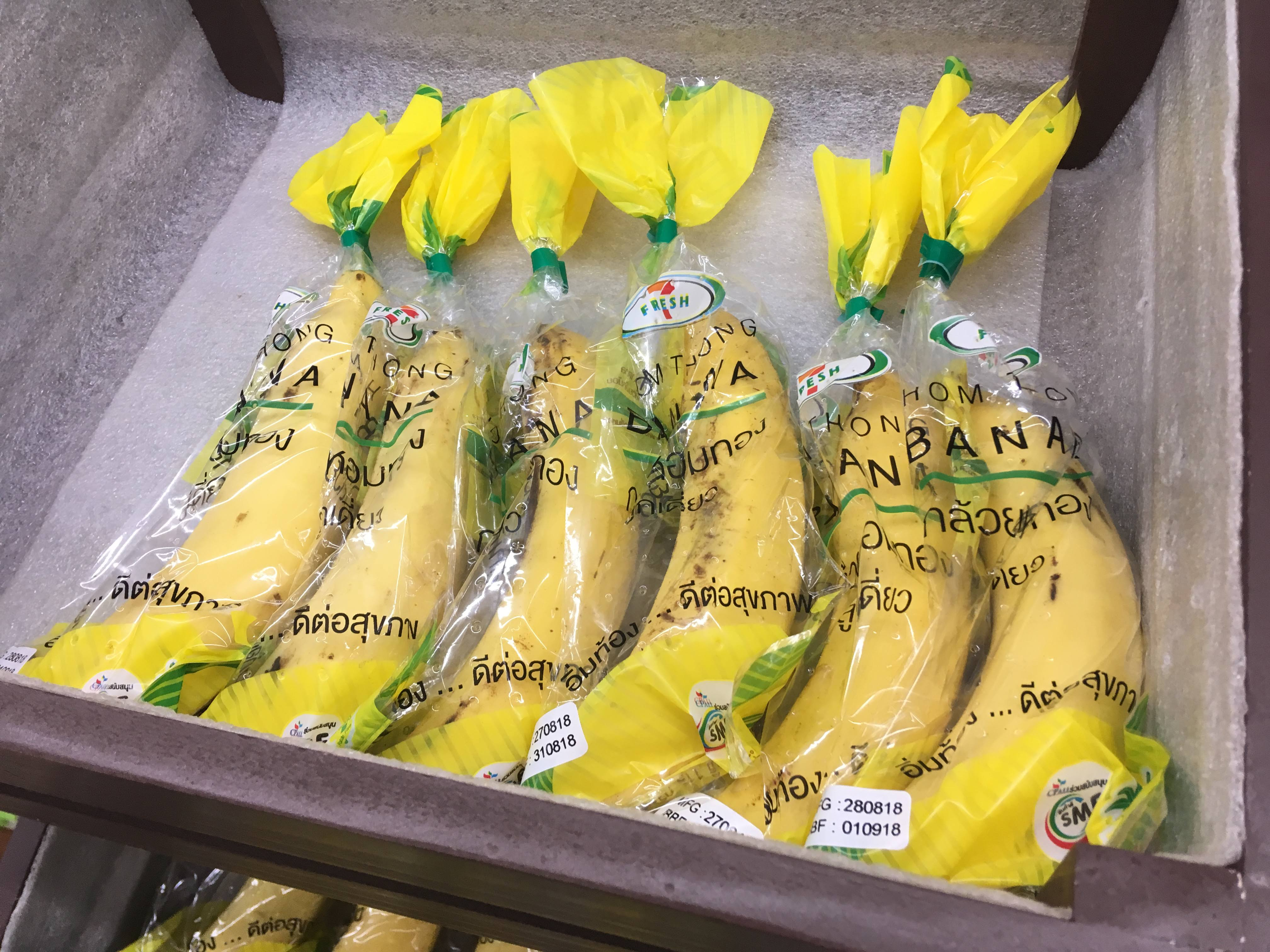
Individual bananas inside plastic bags

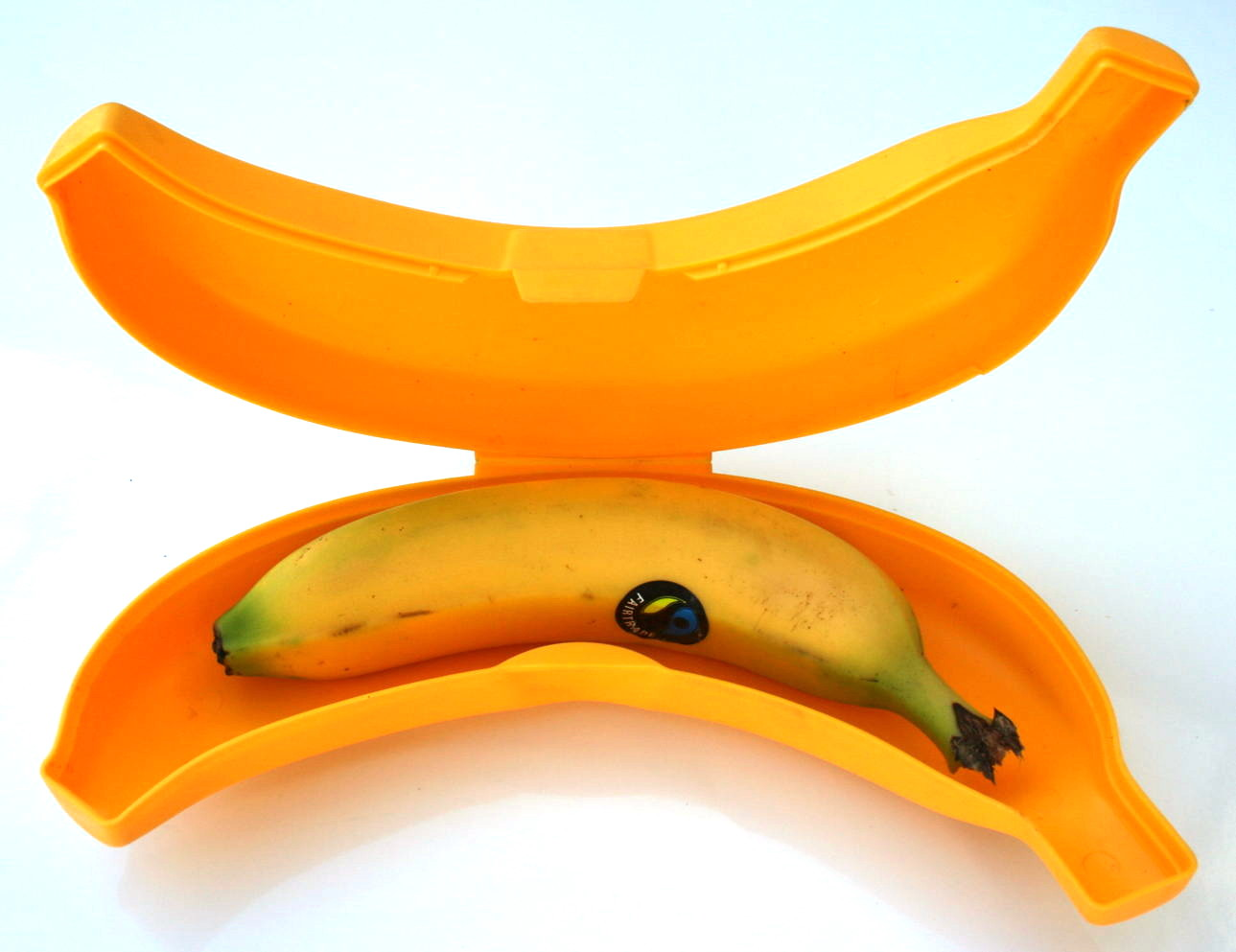
Banana in plastic container

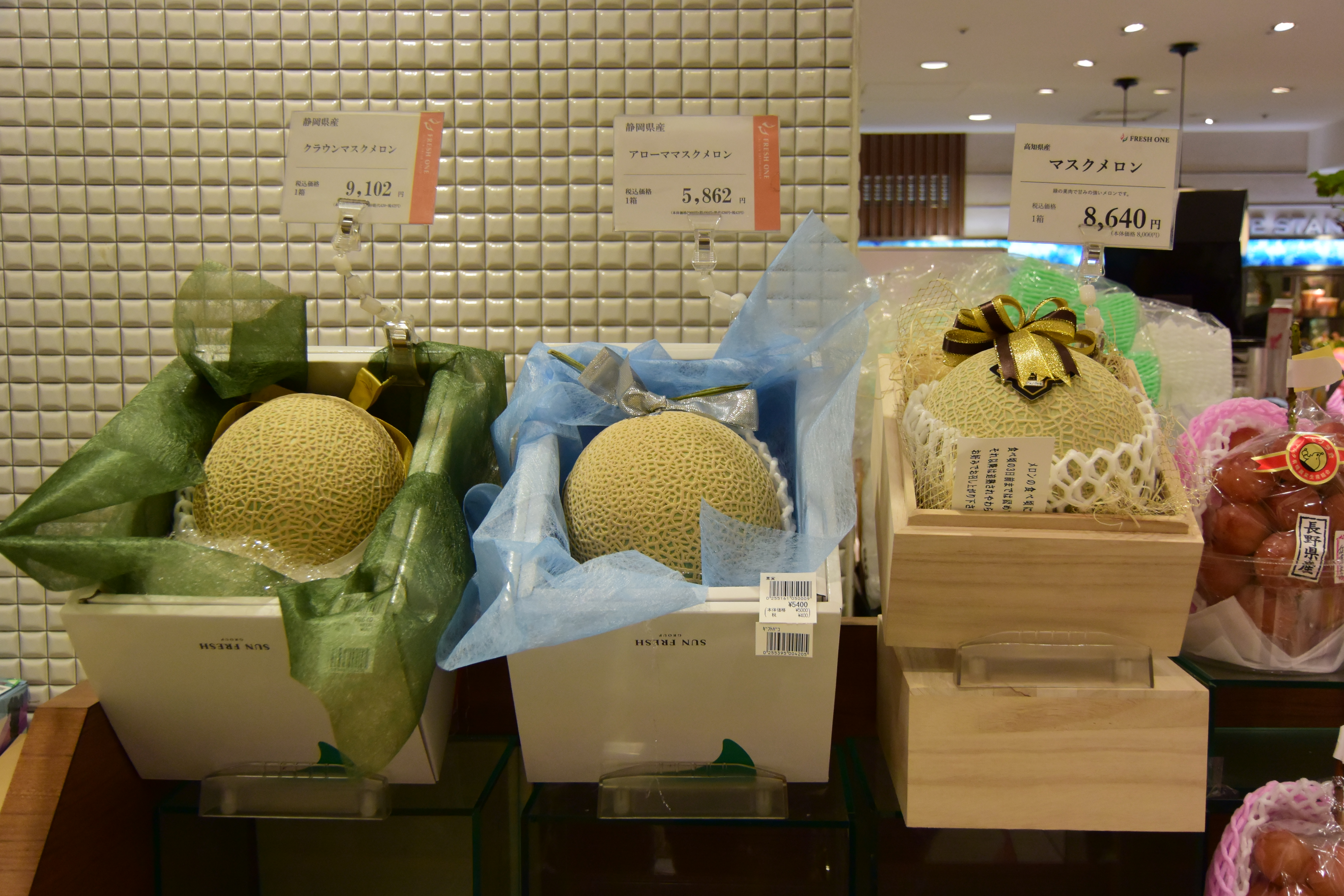
Melons with wrappings in individual wooden boxes
