= GIF (disambiguation) =

GIF is the Graphics Interchange Format, a bitmap image format.

GIF may also refer to:

== Organisations ==
- Gefle IF, a Swedish football club
- Generation IV International Forum, a body promoting development of new nuclear reactor designs

== Places ==
- Winter Haven's Gilbert Airport (IATA airport code: GIF), Florida, US
- Gif-sur-Yvette, France

== Biochemistry ==
- Growth Inhibitory Factor (metallothionein-3), a protein
- Gastric intrinsic factor, a glycoprotein

== Other uses ==
- Gifford–Inchelium ferry, Washington, US
- granular iron formation

== See also ==
- Jif (disambiguation)
- Jiff (disambiguation)
