= Folding carton =

Type of paperboard packaging

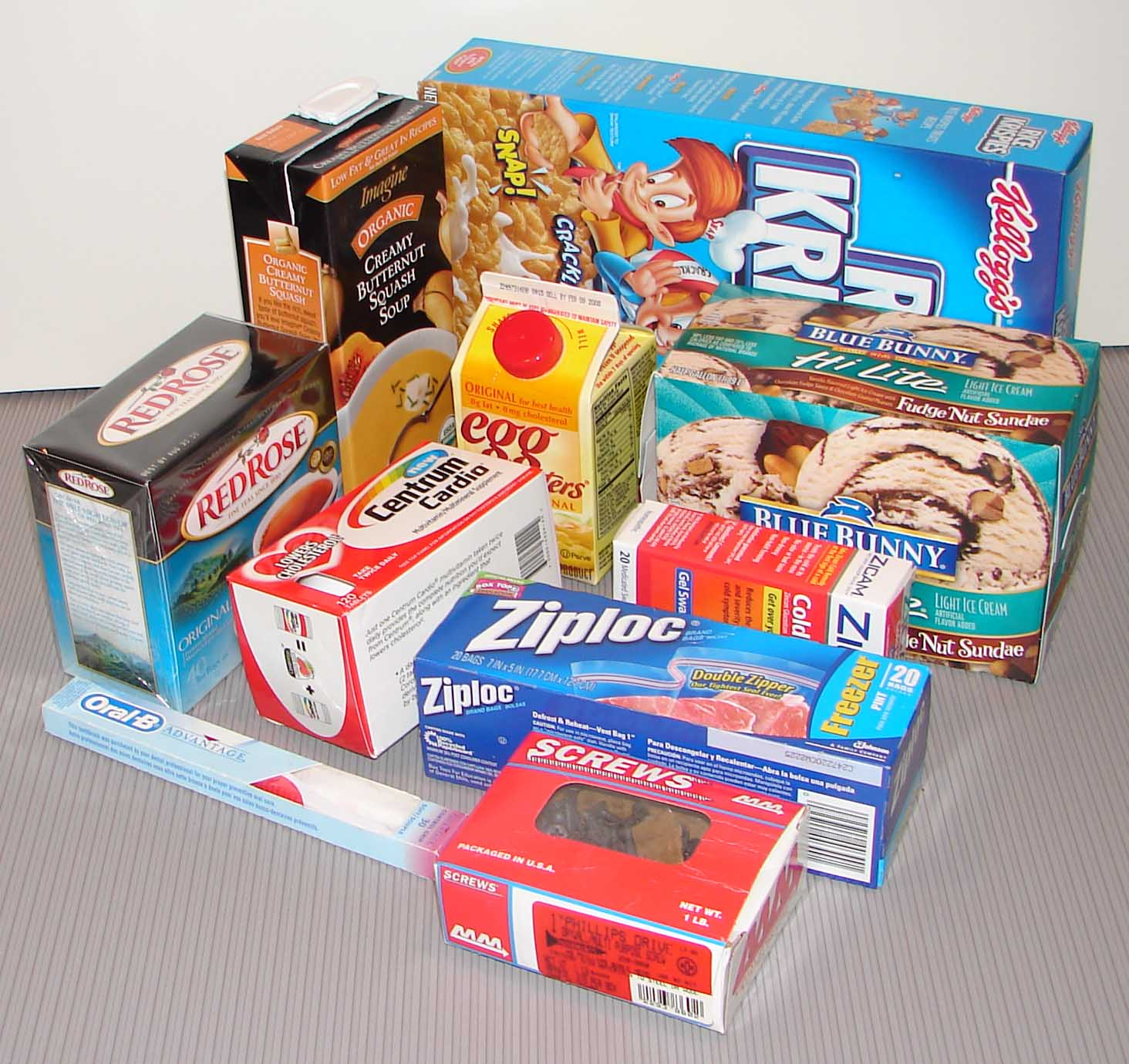
Variety of cartons

The folding carton created the packaging industry as it is known today, beginning in the late 19th century. The process involves folding carton made of paperboard that is printed, laminated, cut, then folded and glued. The cartons are shipped flat to a packager, which has its own machinery to fold the carton into its final shape as a container for a product. Some styles of folding cartons can be made of E-flute or micro-flute corrugated fiberboard.

The folding carton industry does not figure importantly in world trade, although the United States exports considerable quantities of canned foods and other products in folding cartons. The volume of folding carton exports shipped flat is relatively low, amounting to less than 0.5 percent of U.S. production.

== Invention and development ==
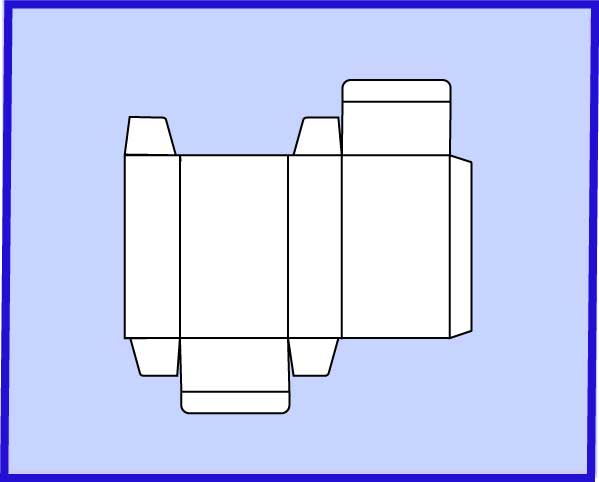
Typical blank for folding carton

In the 1840s, cartons were made by hand and held together with tacks and string, and used only for expensive items (such as jewelry). Although Charles Henry Foyle is described by some as the "inventor" of the paper carton, mass production of the cartons was invented, partly by accident, at the Robert Gair Company in Brooklyn, New York. Machinery at the end of the press had been set up carelessly by a pressman, and machinery cut through the material. This ruined the press but gave them an idea: printing and cutting could be done with one machine. Previously, cutting of printed cardboard had been done manually. From the mistake in 1879, Gair developed a process for mass production of boxes. In 1897, the National Biscuit Company (Nabisco) became the first large company to adopt the new cartons, for Uneeda Biscuits.

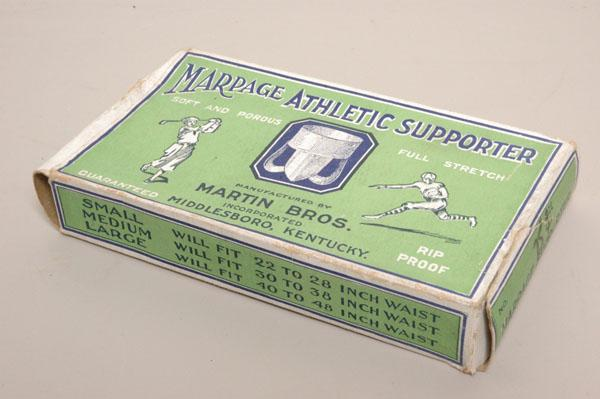
Folding carton of athletic gear; 1930

Other manufacturers soon followed. With inexpensive packaging now even common items could be placed in a showy carton and each carton became its own advertisement. The product was also protected, and the contents had a longer shelf life. This trend was to continue with force, through the 20th century. This could be seen as a contributing factor in the so-called 'throwaway' culture of America. The environmental impact of product packaging has gained attention from consumers and businesses alike, and this awareness has created a steady trend since the mid to late 1990s, on the part of manufacturers, to use recycled material and/or reduce overall materials usage.

== Product characteristics ==
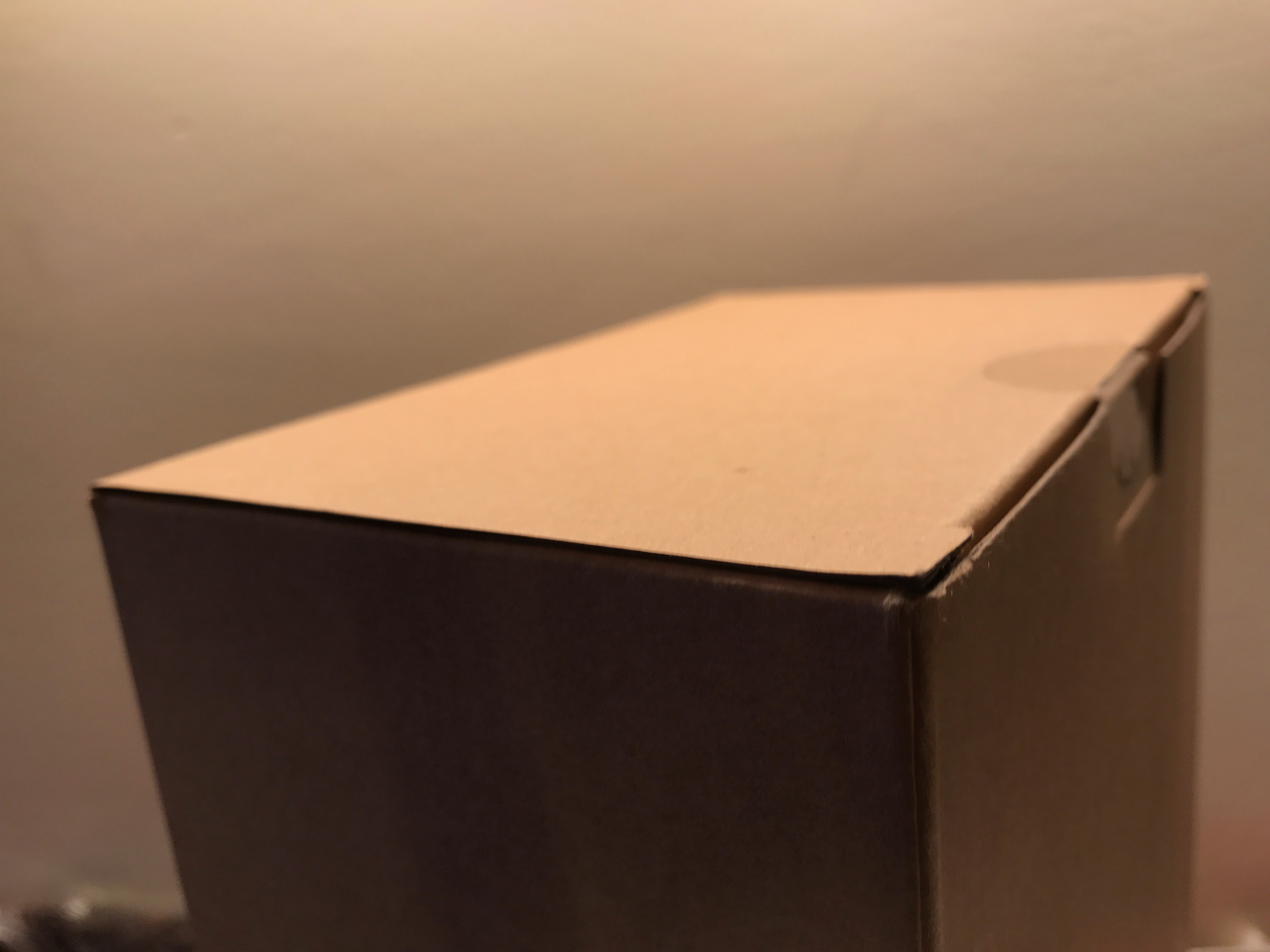
Folding carton with circular security tape seal

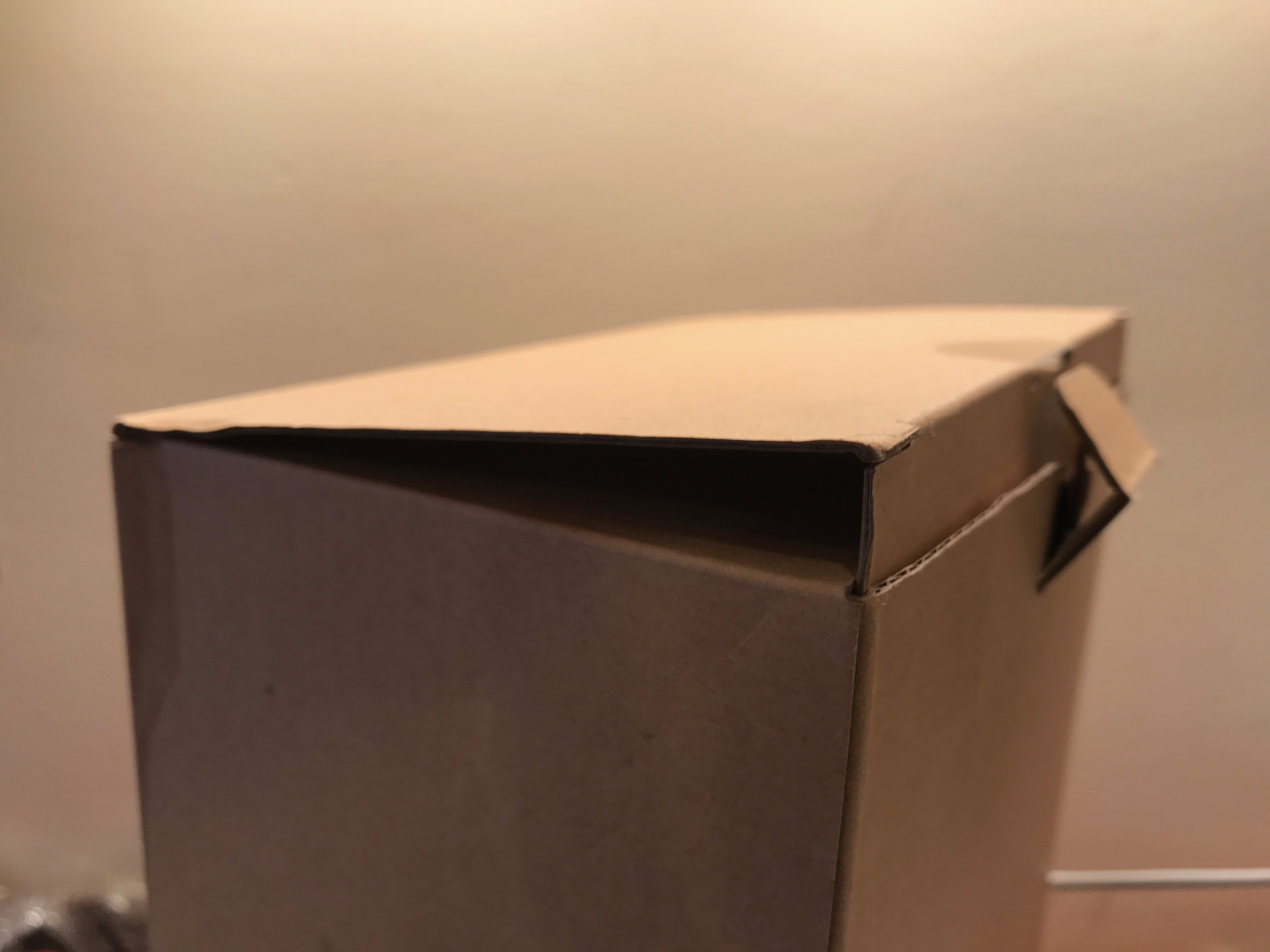
Partially open carton showing tuck flap and locking tab (tongue)

Folding cartons was an estimated $141.1 billion industry in 2024. Typically, cylinder board made from pulp from reprocessed scrap paper is used for most packages. Cartons for food are made from a higher grade and lighter solid sulfate board with plastic coating. Because of the limitations of cutting machinery, the thickness of the board is limited to 0.81 mm (0.032 in), and folding cartons are generally limited to holding a few pounds or kilograms of material. Hundreds of design options are available.

Folding cartons are frequently tall and wide but very thin. For example a typical breakfast cereal box has a poor material to volume ratio and is very inefficient; it is wasteful and can be considered overpackaging. Package designers are aware of this opportunity to save packaging costs, materials, and waste but marketing and merchandising people want the "billboard" style package for advertising and graphics. An optimized folding carton would use much less paperboard for the same volume of cereal, but with reduced room for graphics.

Cartons need to be compatible with the expected packaging machinery; cartoner, conveyors, etc. Some factors can be simulated; others might need a finite element analysis or an experimental process capability study.

== Opening ==
Opening a carton can be accomplished by opening an access flap, cutting, use of tear tapes or perforations.

== See also ==
- Cartoning machine
- Digifold
- Oyster pail
- Tetra Pak
- Elopak
