= Jiffy Packaging =

Packaging manufacturer

Jiffy Packaging is a packaging manufacturer primarily based in Winsford, Cheshire, England. It is most famous for its Jiffy Padded Bags, whose name has become a byword for padded envelopes in British English.

== History ==
Jiffy Packaging Company Limited was incorporated by the Baldwin family in 1964 to produce its namesake Jiffy Padded Bags. The Baldwins had produced wood wool in Birmingham since 1896 and Manchester since 1926 but chose Winsford in Cheshire as the base for their new company. Its product line first began to expand with Jiffy Rugated Products in 1968, and its parent company J. & W. Baldwin Holdings Company Ltd sold off its wood wool facilities to focus on Jiffy and its packaging business in 1975.

It initially sold its products to other packaging companies but in the 21st century began to sell more directly to consumers. It was purchased by the American-based Pregis company but sold with the rest of Pregis Europe in 2014 to the Italian Airpack, who subsequently rebranded the purchased companies "Jiffy Packaging Europe". It now produces a range of paper, bubble, and foam products.

The success of the products in the United Kingdom and Europe has made "jiffy bag" a general term in British English for any padded envelopes. In order to protect its trademarks from becoming fully genericized, Jiffy has taken action since 2015—including threats of litigation—against sellers on online platforms such as eBay who use their name without permission.
