= Digifold =

Box folding technology

- Industry: Box folding

Digifold is a new generation of four and six corner folding device for box gluers and associated machinery. Development began in the late 1990s, and was first exhibited at IPEX 2002 trade show. A system using Siemens S7-200 PLC and Siemens Servo controllers was developed throughout the late 1990s, into the year 2000. It was the first system, in the box folding industry, to use carbon fibre as a construction material (used in the drive shafts), and advanced aluminium (aluminum) alloys in the clamping devices. Although it was not the first servo driven backfolding system, it used advanced materials to improve speed and reduce cost over comparable systems (notably from Jagenberg, Bobst and others)
