= Jiffy (convenience store) =

Thai chain of convenience stores

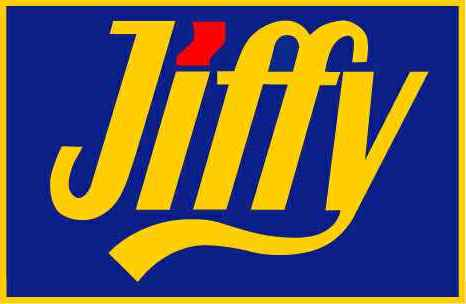
- Company type: Subsidiary
- Industry: Retail (Convenience stores)
- Founded: 1991; 35 years ago (As JET / Jiffy Shops Limited); 2007; 19 years ago (As PTTRM )
- Headquarters: Bangkok, Thailand
- Number of locations: 150
- Area served: Thailand; Cambodia; Laos; Philippines
- Products: Food & Drink; Magazines; Household items
- Parent: PTT Group
- Website: http://www.pttrm.com/

Jiffy is a Thai chain of convenience stores. There are a total of 149 Jiffy convenience stores, mostly in petrol stations.

== Companies ==
- Jiffy Convenience Store
- Jiffy Express
- Jiffy Kitchen
- Jiffy Bistro
- Jiffy Market
- Jiffy Daily
- Jiffy Super Fresh Market
- Jiffy Plus Supermarket

== Revenue ==
Jiffy stores generate monthly revenue of 2.2 million baht each, while 7-Elevens generate 1.2 million baht each, due to their differing sizes.
