= Jiffy Steamer =

Tennessee manufacturer of clothing steamers

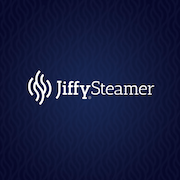
Jiffy steamer logo

Jiffy Steamer, located in Union City, Tennessee, manufactures a variety of clothing steamers. Jiffy Steamer was founded in 1940.

== Product line development ==
The company patented the Model J-1 hat steamer in 1940. Hats, such as fedoras, were a popular element of 1940s fashion. The common way of retaining a hat's shape was to place it over a steaming kettle of water. The J-1 was a standalone device that could do the same task without the requirement of a stove. The concept was later applied to the J-2 garment steamer, a larger version of the J-1 hat steamer that included a clothing rack. This product was aimed at the clothing industry to provide a way of removing wrinkles. The company now offers upgraded versions of the original J-2 clothes steamers, including the J-2000 steamer and several variants that provide different head attachments, and the J-4000, more geared towards the commercial marketplace. The company also manufactures a handheld steamer, the ESTEAM.

== Quality and safety certifications ==
Jiffy Steamer products have met the quality and safety requirements for sale and distribution for most major domestic and international agencies tasked with certification. These include:

- UL Mark, the registered certification mark of UL LLC, an independent, not-for-profit, product safety testing and certification organization
- CSA Mark, product safety and quality mark required for selling products in Canada
- CE Mark, which indicated conformity to the legal requirements of the European Union (EU) Directive with respect to safety, health, environment, and consumer protection
- TUV GS Mark, a voluntary certification and recognized symbol in Germany for safety-tested products
- NOM Mark, Mexican government safety testing mark required for all electronic products

== US patent information ==
Jiffy Steamer's products and/or their components are covered by one or more of the following United States Patents: D421,165; D423,156; D426,924.
