= Jif =

Jif, Jiff, JIFF or JIF may refer to:

== Brand names ==
- Cif, a Unilever cleaning product, branded as "Jif" in Australia, New Zealand, Middle East and the Nordic countries
- Jif (lemon juice), a brand of lemon juice sold in the United Kingdom and Ireland by Unilever
- Jif (peanut butter), made by the J.M. Smucker Co.

== Festivals ==
- Jaipur International Film Festival, India
- Jeonju International Film Festival, Korea

== Other uses ==
- Jiffs, British army slang for soldiers of the Indian National Army
- Journal impact factor, a metric of an academic journal importance
- JPEG Interchange Format, the file format for the JPEG image compression standard
- A pronunciation of GIF

== See also ==
- GIF (disambiguation)
- Jiffy (disambiguation)
