= Padded envelope =

Envelope with protective padding to protect items during shipping

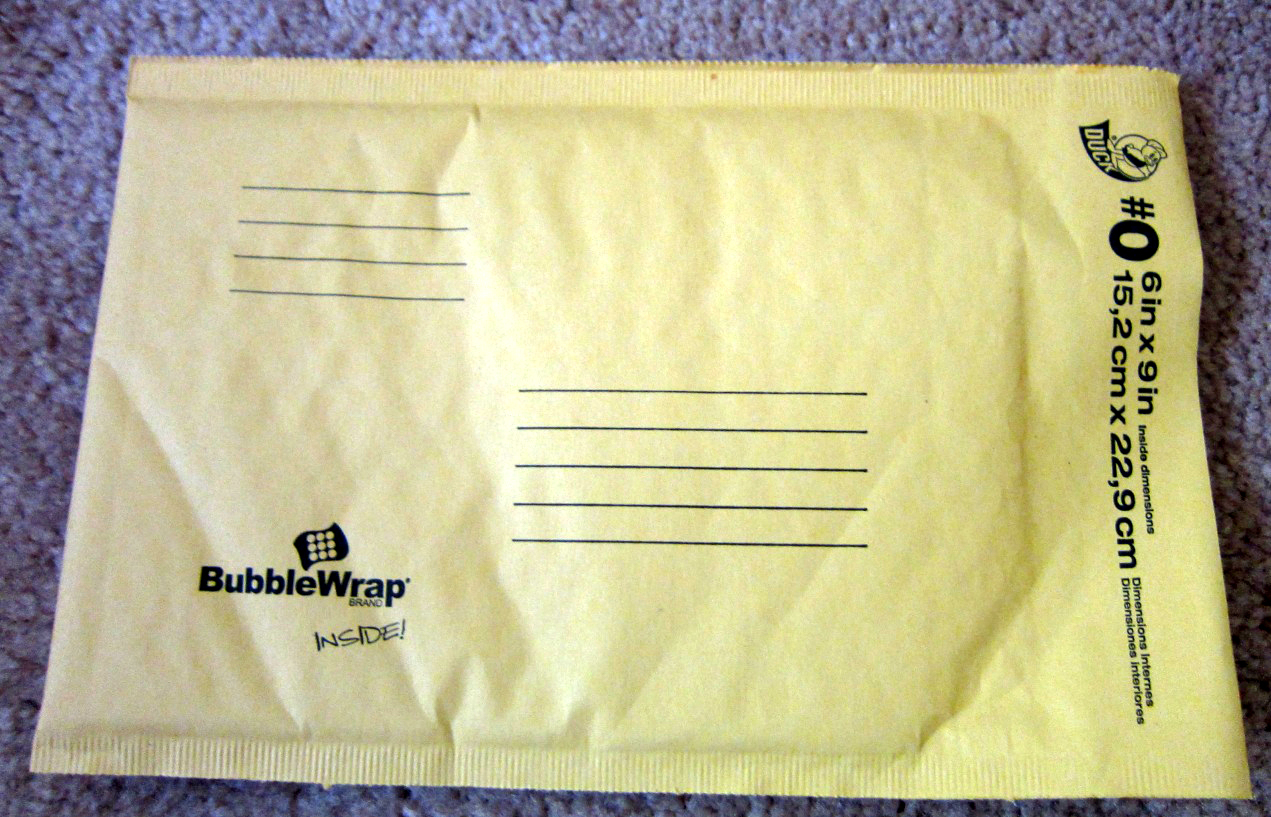
A padded envelope by Bubble Wrap

A padded envelope, also known as a padded or cushioned mailer, or jiffy bag in the United Kingdom, is an envelope incorporating protective padding to protect items during shipping. The padding is usually thick paper, bubble wrap, or foam.

== Uses ==
Mailing envelopes and small packages may receive as many as 27 handlings during shipment with the maximum drop height of 1.2 metres (3.9 ft). The contents of the mailing envelopes often need protection from shock and vibration damage. Cushioning or padding can be built into the mailing envelope to help protect the contents.

== Construction ==
Several constructions are available.

=== Exterior ===
The exterior envelope can be made of a heavy paper, paperboard, corrugated fiberboard or plastic film.

=== Padding ===
The padding material can be recycled newsprint, foam, bubble wrap, or other cushioning materials.

=== Closure ===
Many mailers have an integral flap that has a pressure-sensitive adhesive, a gummed (water-activated) adhesive, or tape to allow easy and secure closure.

== Environmental impact ==
A Life Cycle Analysis was conducted to compare a Kraft paper mailer with newsprint padding to a LDPE plastic mailer with air bubble padding. Both had advantages and disadvantages; overall, the Kraft padded mailer had a higher overall environmental impact compared to the LDPE bubble mailer. The study recommended use of future products with lower mass and which use renewable resources.

== See also ==
- Jiffy Packaging
