= Anuga FoodTec =

Food industry trade fair

- Status: Active
- Genre: food processing, food packaging, safety and analytics, digitalisation, automation, intralogistics, environment and energy, science and pioneering
- Venue: Cologne Trade Fair Center (Koelnmesse)
- Location: Cologne
- Country: Germany
- Inaugurated: 1996
- Attendance: nearly 40,000 from 133 countries (2024)
- Organizer: Koelnmesse GmbH
- Website: http://www.anugafoodtec.com/

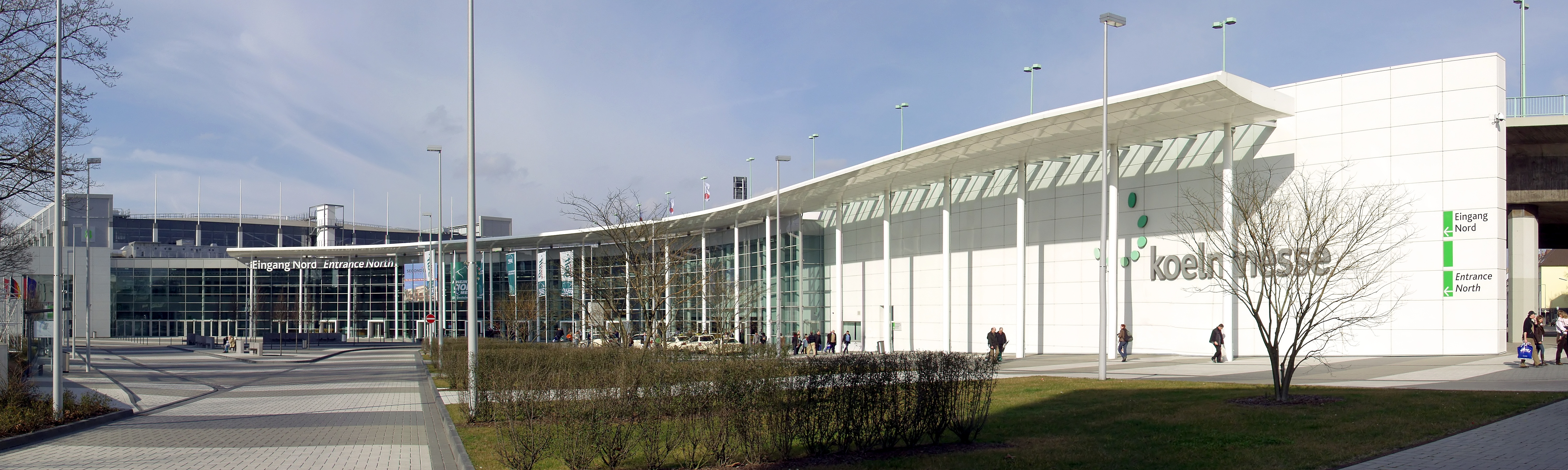
Koelnmesse North Entrance

Anuga FoodTec (official subtitle: "International Supplier Fair for the Food and Beverage Industry") is a trade fair for the food and beverage industry. It covers aspects of food production including process technology, filling and packaging technology, packaging materials, ingredients, food safety, and food production. It is structured into eight product segments: food processing, food packaging, safety and analytics, digitalization, automation, intralogistics, environment and energy, science and pioneering.

The fair takes place every three years in Cologne. The event is organized by Koelnmesse, and is sponsored by the Deutsche Landwirtschafts-Gesellschaft e.v. (German Agricultural Society).

== History ==
Originating from the former Anuga-Technica and DLG-FoodTec, Anuga FoodTec has been providing an overview of food production technologies since 1996. Since 2011, Koelnmesse has maintained a strategic partnership for Anuga FoodTec with the "Packaging Machinery Manufacturers Institute" (PMMI), USA (the organizer of Pack Expo and Expo Pack). In April 2016, Koelnmesse entered into a cooperation with Fiere di Parma to jointly organize the Cibus Tec food technology trade fair in Parma in the future.

"In 2012, it had 42,986 visitors (from 126 countries) and 1,289 exhibitors (from 41 countries), and was conducted on a gross area of 127,000 m². In 2012, exhibitors increased by over 10% and visitors increased over 27%. In 2015, it had 1,479 exhibitors (from 49 countries) - an increase of 15 percent, a gross area of 129,700 m² and 45,604 visitors (from 139 countries) - an increase of 6 percent. Over 54 percent of visitors came from abroad."

In 2018, 1,657 exhibitors and over 50,000 visitors (from 152 countries) came to the fair.

In 2021, the trade show had to be postponed to April 2022 due to the COVID-19 pandemic. It took place with 1,034 exhibitors and around 25,000 visitors.

In March 2024 1,307 companies exhibited and around 40,000 trade visitors from 133 countries came to Cologne. Sandrine Dixson-Declève, Co-President of the Club of Rome kicked off Anuga FoodTec with her keynote speech, “Opportunities on the Road to Climate Neutrality“. ‘Responsibility’ was the top theme of the trade fair. The trade fair addressed also the theme of the processing of alternative proteins and the necessary know-how along the entire process chain. In this course, Anuga FoodTec and the German Association for Alternative Protein Sources (BALPro e.V.) extended their cooperation in March 20224. Among the visitors were Anheuser-Busch Inbev, Arla Foods, Asahi, Conagra Brands, Danone, DMK Deutsches Milchkontor, Dr. Oetker, FrieslandCampina, General Mills, Kraft Heinz, Lactalis, McCain, Meiji, Mengniu, Mondelez, Müller (company), Nestlé, Nomad, Plukon Food Group, Saputo, Schreiber Foods, Sprehe Group, Unilever and Yili.

== Services ==
The Anuga FoodTec provides an overview of the technologies of the manufacturing and packaging process in the production of food and drink. It is arranged in separate segments like:

- Process technology
- Filling and packaging technology
- Automation, software and control equipment
- Laboratory technology, analytics, biotechnology and quality equipment
- Operation materials and environmental technology
- Refrigeration and air-conditioning technology
- Conveying, transport and storage facilities, logistics and intralogistics
- Ingredients and auxiliary materials
- Components, assemblies, surface technology and accessories
- Service firms, organizations and publishers
- Packaging materials, packaging and packaging aids
