= List of largest dairy companies =

The world's largest dairy companies by revenue made with dairy products are estimated and ranked annually by the Rabobank.

== 2024 ==
Largest dairy companies by dairy revenue (FY 2023)
Rank	Company	Headquarters	Dairy product revenue in bn. US$
1	Lactalis	France	30.2
2	Nestlé	Switzerland	24.1
3	Dairy Farmers of America	United States	21.7
4	Danone	France	19.7
5	Yili Group	China	17.5
6	Fonterra	New Zealand	15.1
7	Arla Foods	Denmark	14.8
8	FrieslandCampina	Netherlands	14.1
9	Mengniu Dairy	China	13.9
10	Saputo Inc.	Canada	12.8
11	Amul	India	11
12	Unilever	United Kingdom	8.7
13	Schreiber Foods	United States	7.4
14	Savencia Fromage & Dairy	France	7.4
15	Müller	Germany	6.7
16	Sodiaal	France	6.3
17	Agropur	Canada	6.1
18	DMK Deutsches Milchkontor	Germany	5.9
19	Froneri	United Kingdom	5.7
20	Grupo Lala	Mexico	5.6

== 2023 ==
Largest dairy companies by dairy revenue (FY 2022)
Rank	Company	Headquarters	Dairy product revenue in bn. US$
1	Lactalis	France	28.6
2	Dairy Farmers of America	United States	24.5
3	Nestlé	Switzerland	23.3
4	Danone	France	21.2
5	Yili Group	China	18.3
6	Arla Foods	Denmark	14.5
7	FrieslandCampina	Netherlands	14.4
8	Mengniu Dairy	China	14.4
9	Fonterra	New Zealand	14.2
10	Saputo Inc.	Canada	13.7
11	Unilever	United Kingdom	8.3
12	Amul	India	7.0
13	Savencia Fromage & Dairy	France	6.9
14	Müller	Germany	6.5
15	Agropur	Canada	6.5
16	Schreiber Foods	United States	6.5
17	Sodiaal	France	5.8
18	DMK Deutsches Milchkontor	Germany	5.5
19	Froneri	United Kingdom	5.3
20	Glanbia	Ireland	5.1

== 2022 ==
Largest dairy companies by dairy revenue (FY 2021)
Rank	Company	Headquarters	Dairy product revenue in bn. US$
1	Nestlé	Switzerland	26.7
2	Lactalis	France	21.3
3	Danone	France	20.9
4	Dairy Farmers of America	United States	19.3
5	Yili Group	China	18.2
6	Fonterra	New Zealand	14.8
7	Mengniu Dairy	China	13.7
8	FrieslandCampina	Netherlands	13.6
9	Arla Foods	Denmark	13.3
10	Saputo Inc.	Canada	12.0
11	Amul	India	9.6
12	Savencia Fromage & Dairy	France	6.6
13	Unilever	United Kingdom	6.3
14	Sodiaal	France	5.9
15	Meiji Holdings	Japan	5.9
16	Agropur	Canada	5.8
17	Müller	Germany	5.7
18	DMK Deutsches Milchkontor	Germany	5.2
19	Schreiber Foods	United States	5.1
20	Froneri	United Kingdom	5.0

== 2021 ==
Largest dairy companies by dairy revenue (FY 2020)
Rank	Company	Headquarters	Dairy product revenue in bn. US$
1	Nestlé	Switzerland	23.0
2	Lactalis	France	21.0
3	Dairy Farmers of America	United States	19.0
4	Danone	France	17.3
5	Yili Group	China	13.8
6	Fonterra	New Zealand	13.6
7	FrieslandCampina	Netherlands	12.7
8	Arla Foods	Denmark	12.1
9	Mengniu Dairy	China	11.0
10	Saputo Inc.	Canada	10.7
11	Unilever	United Kingdom	6.6
12	DMK Deutsches Milchkontor	Germany	6.4
13	Meiji Holdings	Japan	6.0
14	Savencia Fromage & Dairy	France	5.9
15	Kraft Heinz	United States	5.6
16	Agropur	Canada	5.6
17	Sodiaal	France	5.5
18	Amul	India	5.3
19	Schreiber Foods	United States	5.1
20	Müller	Germany	5.1

== 2020 ==
Largest dairy companies by dairy revenue (FY 2019)
Rank	Company	Headquarters	Dairy product revenue in bn. US$
1	Nestlé	Switzerland	22.1
2	Lactalis	France	21.0
3	Dairy Farmers of America	United States	20.1
4	Danone	France	18.2
5	Yili Group	China	13.4
6	Fonterra	New Zealand	13.2
7	FrieslandCampina	Netherlands	12.6
8	Mengniu Dairy	China	11.9
9	Arla Foods	Denmark	11.8
10	Saputo Inc.	Canada	11.3
11	DMK Deutsches Milchkontor	Germany	6.5
12	Unilever	United Kingdom	6.4
13	Meiji Holdings	Japan	5.9
14	Sodiaal	France	5.7
15	Savencia Fromage & Dairy	France	5.6
16	Amul	India	5.5
17	Agropur	Canada	5.5
18	Kraft Heinz	United States	5.4
19	Schreiber Foods	United States	5.1
20	Müller	Germany	4.9

== 2019 ==
Largest dairy companies by dairy revenue (FY 2018)
Rank	Company	Headquarters	Dairy product revenue in bn. US$
1	Nestlé	Switzerland	24.3
2	Lactalis	France	20.8
3	Danone	France	18.0
4	Fonterra	New Zealand	14.3
5	FrieslandCampina	Netherlands	13.8
6	Dairy Farmers of America	United States	13.6
7	Arla Foods	Denmark	12.4
8	Yili Group	China	11.2
9	Saputo Inc.	Canada	11.0
10	Mengniu Dairy	China	10.3
11	Dean Foods	United States	7.5
12	Unilever	Netherlands, United Kingdom	6.7
13	DMK Deutsches Milchkontor	Germany	6.7
14	Kraft Heinz	United States	6.0
15	Sodiaal	France	6.0
16	Meiji Holdings	Japan	5.8
17	Savencia Fromage & Dairy	France	5.7
18	Agropur	Canada	5.2
19	Schreiber Foods	United States	5.1
20	Müller	Germany	5.1

== 2018 ==
Largest dairy companies by dairy revenue (FY 2017)
Rank	Company	Headquarters	Dairy product revenue in bn. US$
1	Nestlé	Switzerland	24.2
2	Lactalis	France	19.9
3	Danone	France	17.6
4	Dairy Farmers of America	United States	14.7
5	Fonterra	New Zealand	13.7
6	FrieslandCampina	Netherlands	13.6
7	Arla Foods	Denmark	11.7
8	Saputo Inc.	Canada	10.8
9	Yili Group	China	9.9
10	Mengniu Dairy	China	8.8
11	Dean Foods	United States	7.5
12	Unilever	Netherlands, United Kingdom	7.0
13	DMK Deutsches Milchkontor	Germany	6.5
14	Kraft Heinz	United States	6.2
15	Meiji Holdings	Japan	5.8
16	Sodiaal	France	5.8
17	Savencia Fromage & Dairy	France	5.5
18	Müller	Germany	5.1
19	Agropur	Canada	5.1
20	Schreiber Foods	United States	5.0

== 2017 ==
Largest dairy companies by dairy revenue (FY 2016)
Rank	Company	Headquarters	Dairy product revenue in bn. US$
1	Nestlé	Switzerland	24.0
2	Danone	France	18.3
3	Lactalis	France	18.0
4	Dairy Farmers of America	United States	13.5
5	FrieslandCampina	Netherlands	12.3
6	Fonterra	New Zealand	12.0
7	Arla Foods	Denmark	9.9
8	Yili Group	China	9.0
9	Saputo Inc.	Canada	8.4
10	Mengniu Dairy	China	8.2
11	Dean Foods	United States	7.4
12	Unilever	Netherlands, United Kingdom	6.9
13	Kraft Heinz	United States	6.4
14	Meiji Holdings	Japan	6.1
15	DMK Deutsches Milchkontor	Germany	5.6
16	Sodiaal	France	5.3
17	Schreiber Foods	United States	4.9
18	Savencia Fromage & Dairy	France	4.9
19	Müller	Germany	4.9
20	Agropur	Canada	4.6
