= Chicecream =

Chinese ice cream company

Zhongxuegao Food (Shanghai) Co., Ltd.
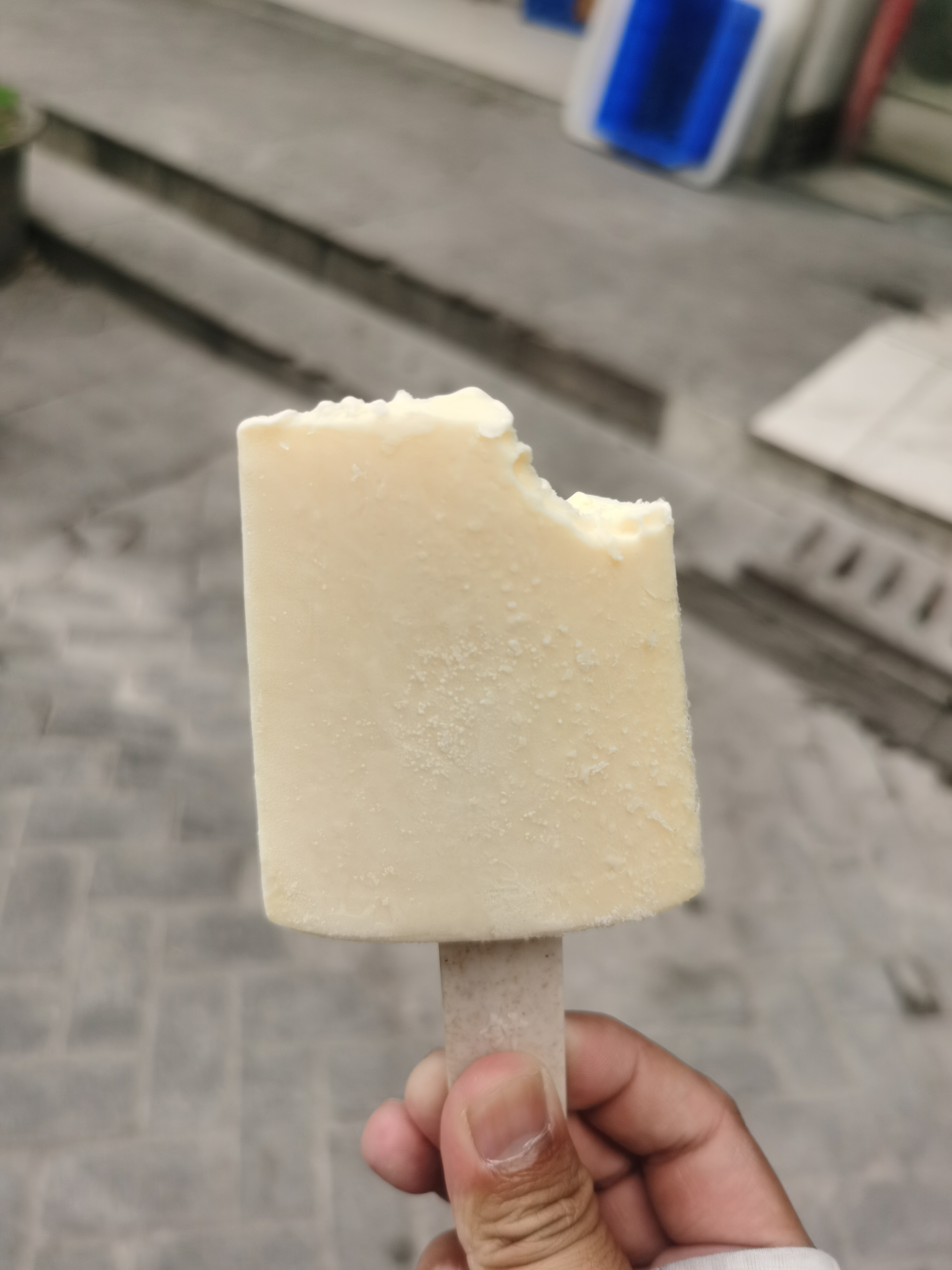
- A Chicecream bar
- Trade name: Chicecream
- Native name: 钟薛高食品（上海）有限公司
- Founded: 14 March 2018
- Founder: Lin Sheng (林盛)
- Defunct: 6 June 2025
- Headquarters: Shanghai, China
- Products: Ice cream and other food products
- Website: zhongxuegao.com (archived)

Chicecream
- Simplified Chinese: 钟薛高
- Traditional Chinese: 鍾薛高
Transcriptions
Standard Mandarin
- Hanyu Pinyin: Zhōng Xuē Gāo

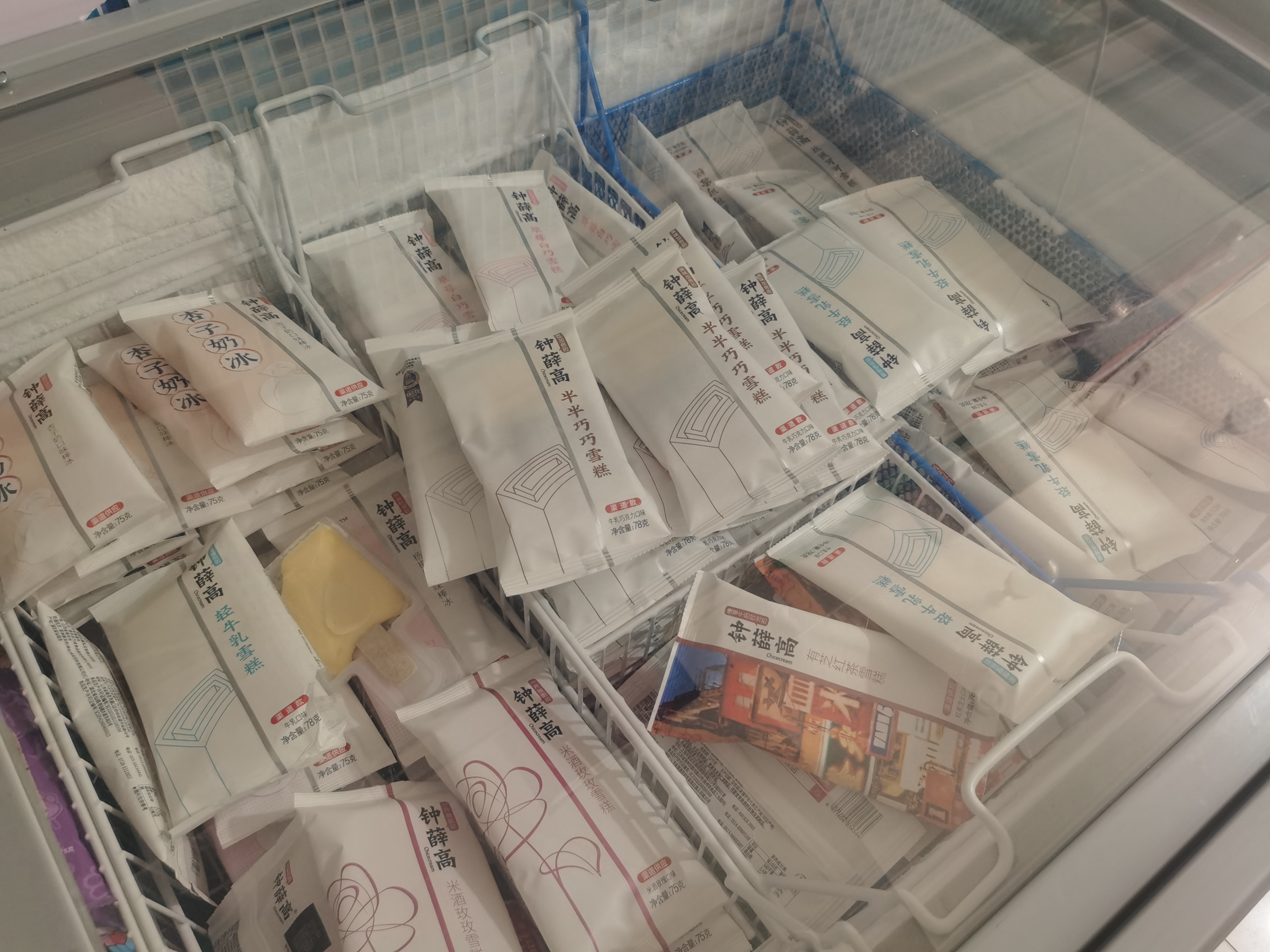
Different flavors of Chicecream

Zhongxuegao Food (Shanghai) Co., Ltd., doing business as Chicecream, was a Chinese ice cream company from 2018 to 2025 based in Shanghai, known for its high prices. The brand positioned its product as a premium ice cream. The company filed for bankruptcy at a Shanghai district court in June 2025.

== Brand identity ==
Chicecream was known for its high prices and was nicknamed the "Hermes of ice cream". As of 2021, its ice cream bars usually sold for about 13–18 RMB each, though a particularly expensive cocoa powder popsicle called "Ecuador Pink" sold for 66 RMB. In contrast, most other ice cream brands in China sell for 2–8 RMB each. CEO and founder Lin Sheng attributes the company's high prices to the high cost of imported ingredients such as yuzu.

The company's brand identity relied on its status as a homegrown Chinese luxury ice cream company, in contrast to imported Western brands like Häagen-Dazs and Magnum. The brand's Chinese name, 钟薛高 (Zhōng Xuē Gāo), is a combination of the Chinese surnames Zhong, Xue, and Gao as well as a pun: it is nearly homophonous with 中雪糕; Zhōng xuěgāo; 'Chinese ice cream'.

The company advertised its products as healthy, saying that they are all-natural and low in sugar and fat. Data from e-commerce platforms indicates that Chicecream's main demographic is young people aged 26–37, especially women, followed by young people aged 18–25.

== History ==
Chicecream was founded in Shanghai on 14 March 2018. The founder and CEO Lin Sheng (Chinese: 林盛; pinyin: Lín Shèng) is an entrepreneur who previously worked in advertising. The company's first six products were introduced on 20 May 2018. The company is a pioneer in the domestic premium ice cream industry in China: in the past, only foreign ice cream brands like Häagen-Dazs were seen as high-end, while domestic brands such as Mengniu and Yili were seen as lower-end.

Chicecream focused on online sales rather than sales in physical stores, and worked to get internet celebrities to promote its products. One popular blogger, Li Jiaqi, recommended Chicecream in 2020. The brand grew rapidly in popularity and at one point became the most-searched product on Xiaohongshu.

In 2019, Chicecream was fined by regulators in Shanghai for deceptive advertising. The company's advertisements falsely said that the ice cream did not contain any water and that it was made using imported Japanese tea leaves, among other inaccurate claims.

In 2020, the company was affected by the COVID-19 pandemic. According to brand manager Huang Ying (Chinese: 黄颖; pinyin: Huáng Yǐng), Chicecream's aged Irish cheese ice cream was unavailable for months because the cheese could not be imported due to COVID-related shipping disruption. However, Huang also said that the pandemic was good for sales, due to the increased popularity of online shopping.

In May 2021, Chicecream raised 200 million RMB in Series A financing.

In summer 2022, controversy erupted online around claims that Chicecream's products do not melt. On 25 June 2022, a user found that after leaving a Chicecream bar out at a temperature of 31 °C (88 °F) for 50 minutes, it developed a thick, sticky texture but did not become watery or lose its shape. Users speculated that the ice cream did not melt due to preservatives, coagulants, or other additives, such as carrageenan. On 5 July, a viral video showed that a salted coconut flavored Chicecream bar did not melt even under extreme heat, leading viewers to worry about the contents of Chicecream's ice cream and whether it is safe to eat. In response, the company said that the product's physical behavior is because it contains a high concentration of solid particles and relatively little water. The company said that its products satisfy regulatory standards, including national standard GB/T 31119-2014, which regulates frozen desserts. Chicecream also said that it would cooperate in an investigation, and that it believed applying heat to ice cream was not a scientific way to test its quality.

On 6 June 2025, the company filed for bankruptcy at the Shanghai City Yangpu District People's Court.

== Products ==
Chicecream produced more than ten flavors of ice cream, including:

- Ecuador pink (厄瓜多尔粉钻)
- Ghana black gold (加纳黑金)
- Hand-crafted jasmine (手煮茉莉)
- Aged Irish cheese (爱尔兰陈年干酪)
- Salted coconut (海盐椰椰)
- Semi-opportunism (半巧主义)
- Velvet cocoa (丝绒可可)

Chicecream ice cream bars resemble the shape of a Chinese roof tile, and the top of each bar is shaped like the Chinese character 回 ("return"). In collaboration with skincare company Xiaoxiandun (小仙炖), Chicecream introduced an ice cream product made with birds' nests, which are traditionally believed to be good for the skin. Outside of frozen desserts, Chicecream also sells other products, including high-end dumplings and cakes.

Though the company has focused primarily on e-commerce, it also has brick-and-mortar stores in cities including Chengdu, Hangzhou, Shanghai, and Shenzhen.

== See also ==
- Conspicuous consumption
- Food safety in China
- Hey Tea
- Luxury goods of China
- Wanghong economy
