= Zheng Junhuai =

Zheng Junhuai (Chinese: 郑俊怀; born September 1950) is CEO of Heilongjiang Red Star Group. Known as the "Dairy Godfather" of China, Zheng formerly led the Yili Dairy Group and was credited with the company's growth from 1993 up until 2004. He was jailed for six years in 2005 on a charge of embezzlement, but was released in 2008 having served half his sentence.

Zheng was born in 1950 in Hohhot. He received bachelor's degree in business administration.
