= Packaging machinery =

Any machine used for packaging

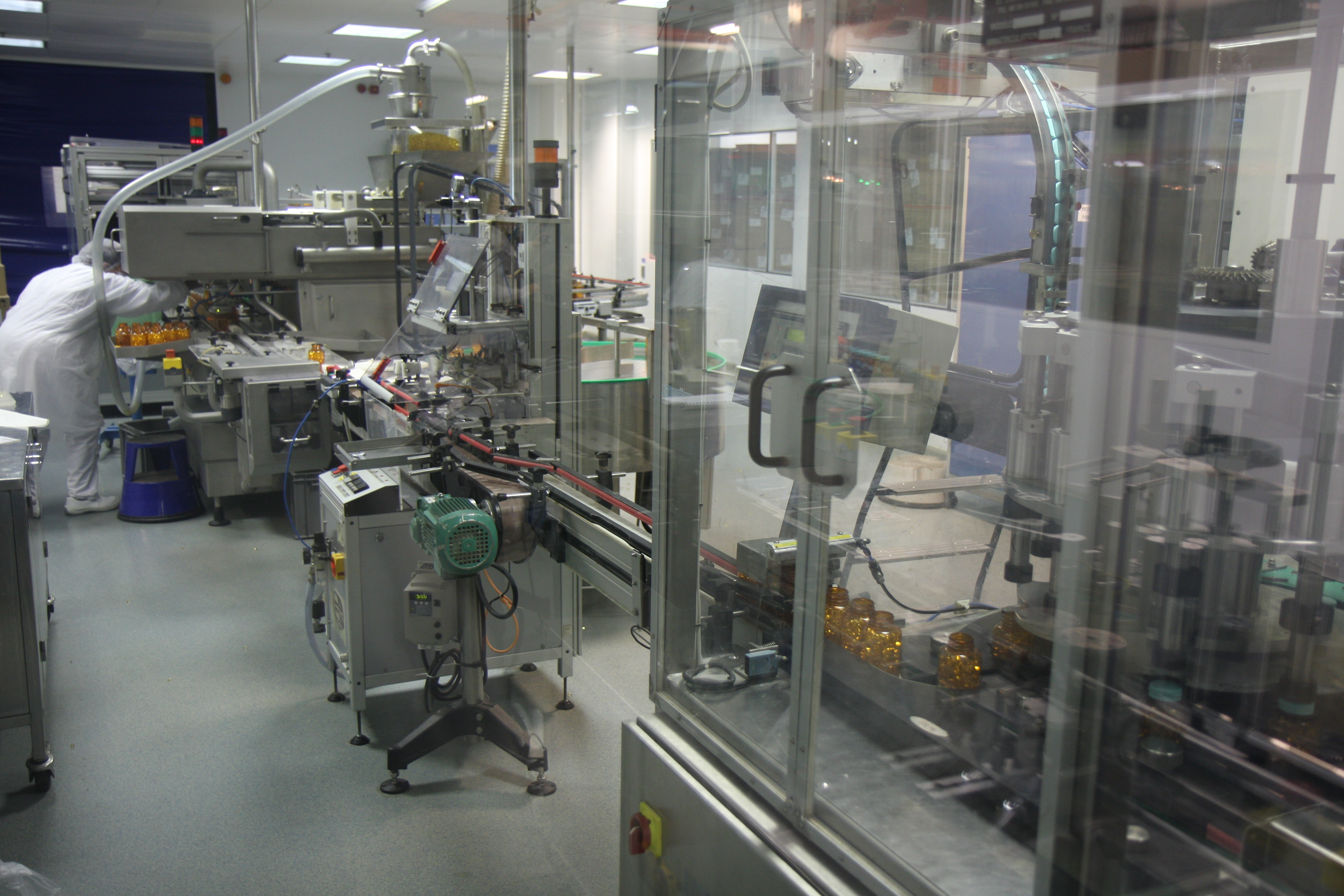
Equipment on a pharmaceutical packaging line

Packaging machinery is used throughout all packaging operations, involving primary packages to distribution packs. This includes many packaging processes: fabrication, cleaning, filling, sealing, combining, labeling, overwrapping, palletizing.

== Overview ==
Some packaging operations cannot be accomplished without packaging equipment. For example, many packages require heat seals to close or seal the package. Heat sealers are needed, even in slow labor-intensive operations.

With many industries, the effectiveness of the heat seal is critical to product safety so the heat sealing operation must be closely controlled with documented Verification and validation protocols. Food, drug, and medical device regulations require consistent seals on packages. Proper equipment is needed.

== Automation ==
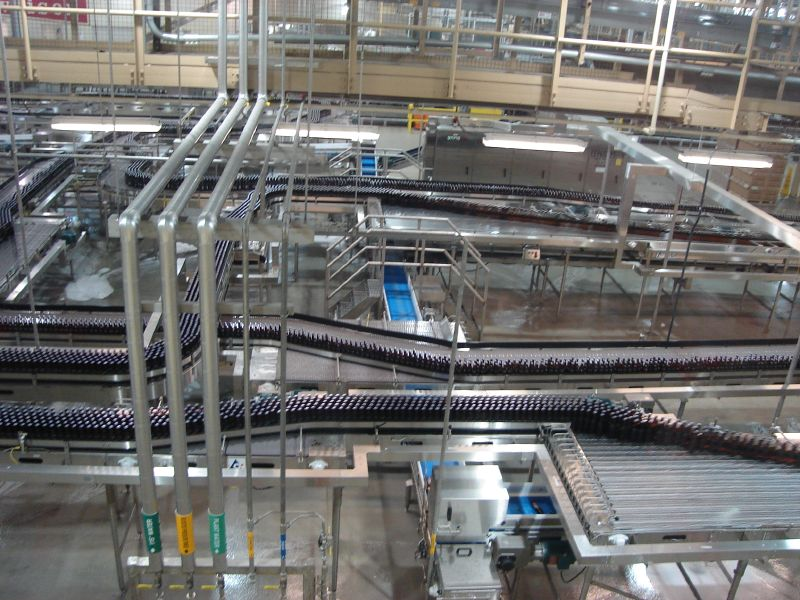
Beer bottling lines

Packaging operations can be designed for variable package sizes and forms or for handling only uniform packages, where the machinery or packaging line is adjustable between production runs. Certainly slow manual operations allow workers to be flexible to package variation but also some automated lines can handle significant random variation.

Moving from manual operations, through semi-automatic operations to fully automated packaging lines offers advantages to some packagers. Other than the obvious control of labor costs, quality can be more consistent, and throughput can be optimized.

Efforts at packaging line automation increasingly use programmable logic controllers and robotics.

Large fully automatic packaging lines can involve several pieces of major equipment from different manufacturers as well as conveyors and ancillary equipment. Integrating such systems can be a challenge. Often consultants or external engineering firms are used to coordinate large projects.

== Choosing packaging machinery ==
Choosing packaging machinery includes an assessment of technical capabilities, labor requirements, worker safety, maintainability, serviceability, reliability, ability to integrate into the packaging line, capital cost, floorspace, flexibility (change-over, materials, multiple products, etc.), energy requirements, quality of outgoing packages, qualifications (for food, pharmaceuticals, etc.), throughput, efficiency, productivity, ergonomics, return on investment, etc.

Packaging machinery can be:

1. purchased as standard, off-the-shelf equipment
2. purchased custom-made or custom-tailored to specific operations
3. purchased refurbished and upgraded
4. manufactured or modified by in-house engineers and maintenance staff

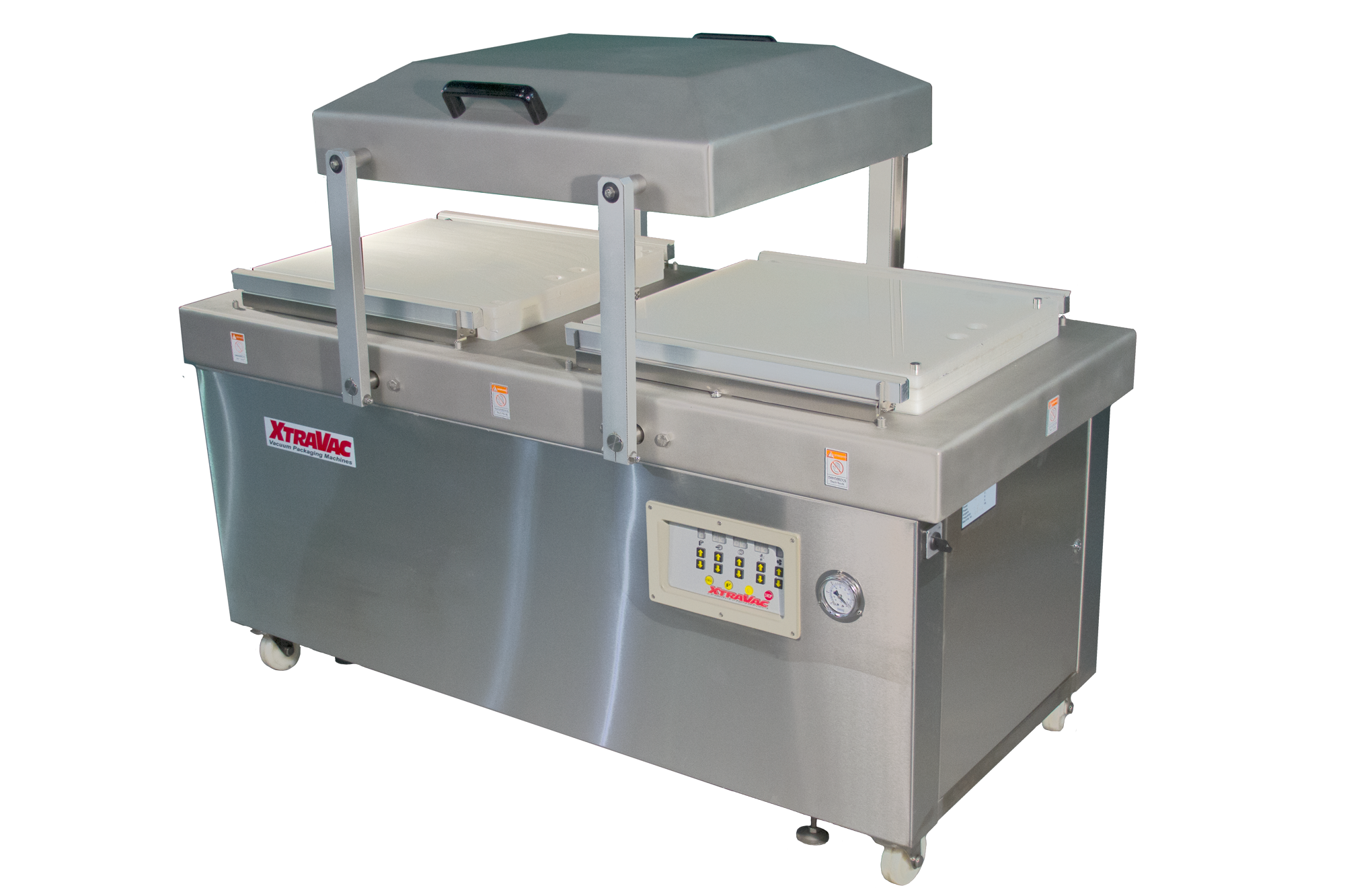
Double chamber vacuum packer

In addition to purchasing equipment, leasing options are often attractive.

Machinery must be compatible with the expected operating conditions. For example, cold temperature operations require special considerations. Some industries must perform periodic washdowns of all equipment. This high pressure chemical washing puts special demands on machinery and control systems. Condensation within closed portions of machinery can also be problematic.

Machinery needs to keep control of the product being packaged. For example, powders need to be stable, liquids cannot slosh out, etc.

Some manufacturers decide not to do their own packaging but to employ contract packagers to perform all or some operations. Capital, labor, and other costs are outsourced.

== Types of machinery ==
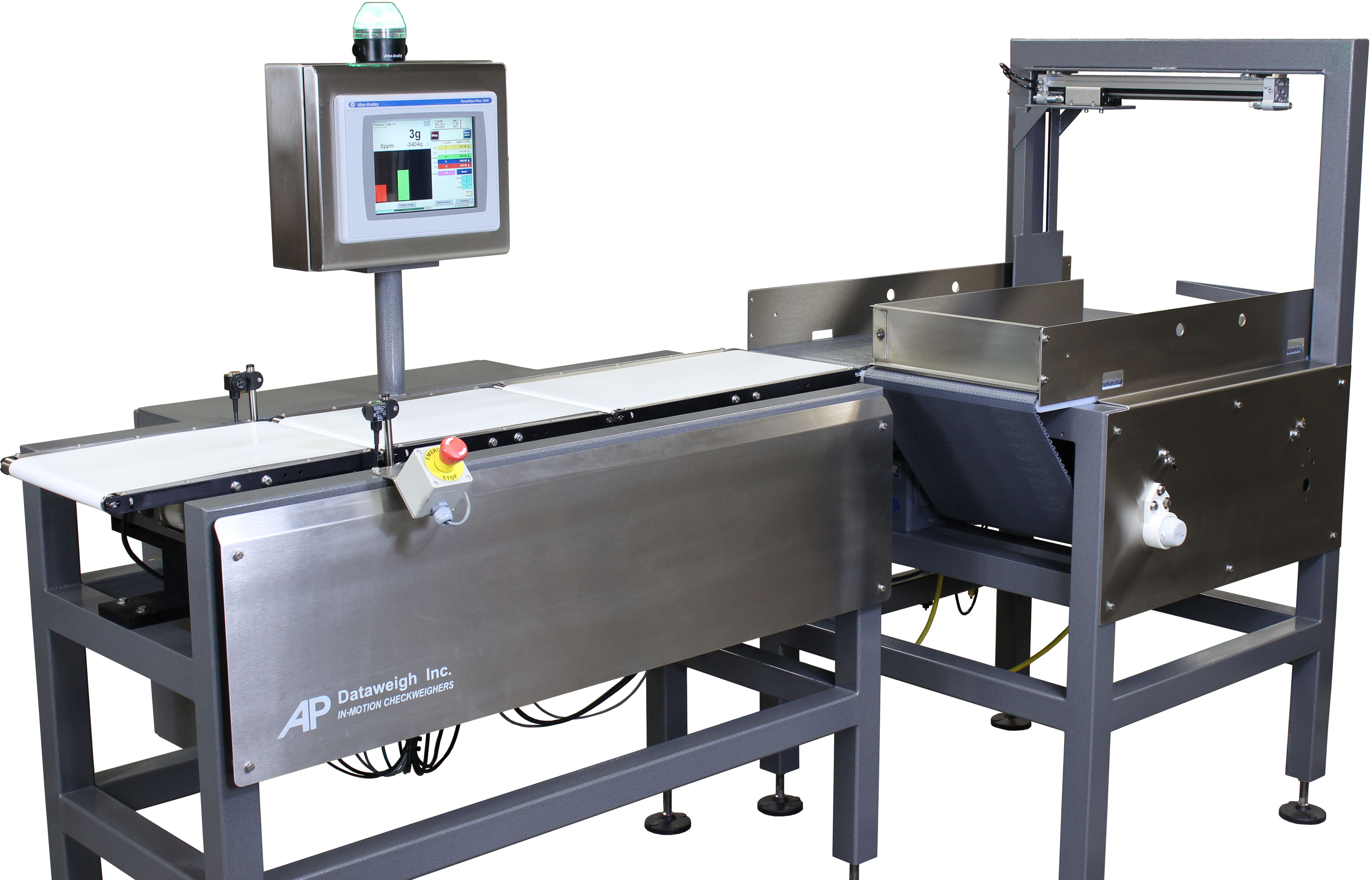
Checkweigher

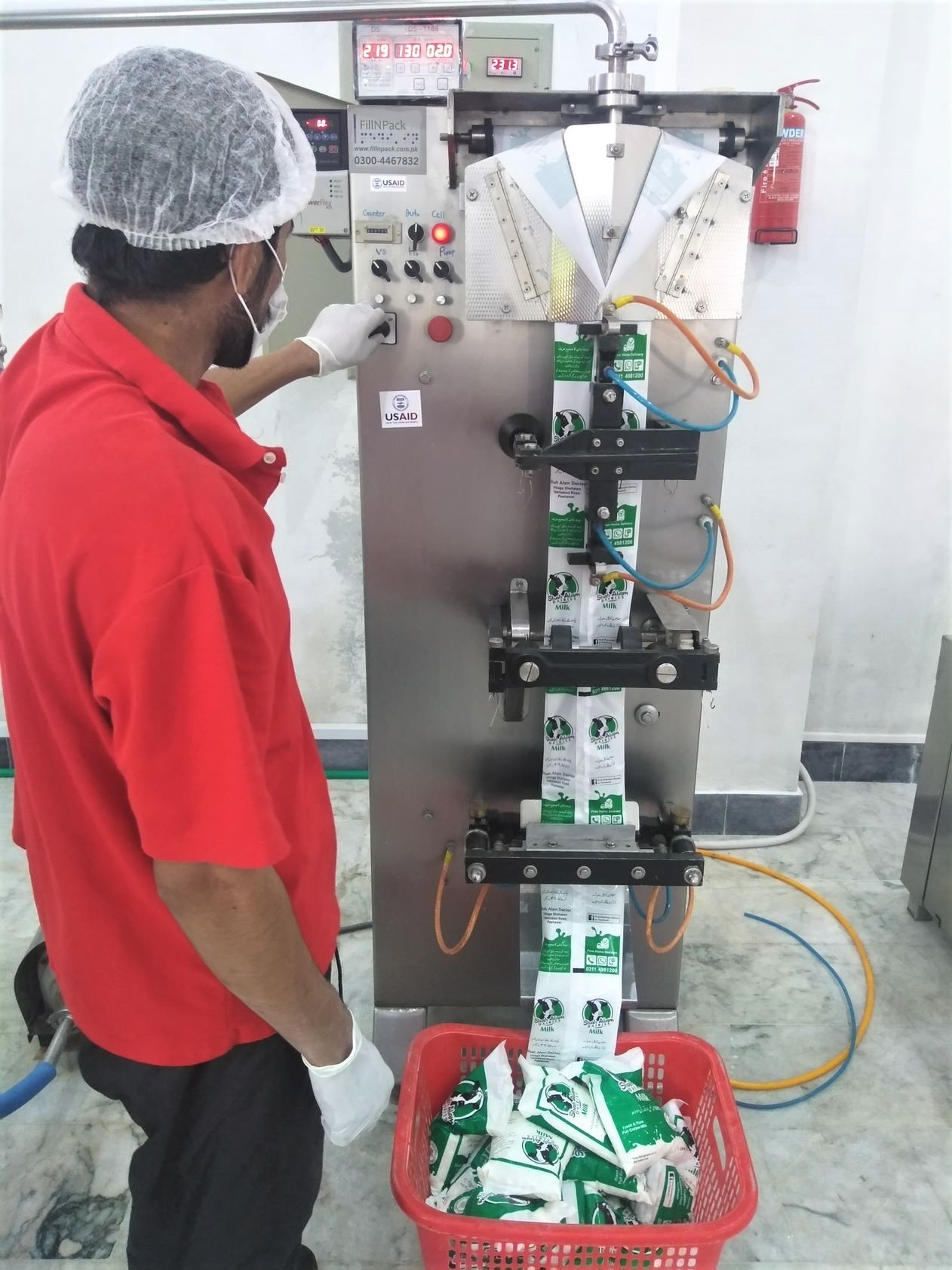
Milk bag form-fill-seal operation

Packaging machines may be of the following general types:

- Accumulating and collating machines
- Blister packs, skin packs and vacuum packaging machines
- Bottle caps equipment, over-capping, lidding, closing, seaming and sealing machines
- Box, case, tray, and carrier forming, packing, unpacking, closing, and sealing machines
- Cartoning machines
- Cleaning, sterilizing, cooling and drying machines
- Coding, printing, marking, stamping, and imprinting machines
- Converting machines
- Conveyor belts, accumulating and related machines
- Feeding, orienting, placing and related machines
- Filling machines: handling dry, powdered, solid, liquid, gas, or viscous products
- Inspecting: visual, sound, metal detecting, etc.
- Label dispensers, printers, and applicators
- Orienting, unscrambling machines
- Package filling and closing machines
- Palletizing, depalletizing, unit load assembly
- Product identification: labeling, marking, etc.
- Sealing machines: heat sealer, tape, or glue units
- Security seals, tamper-evident bands, etc equipment
- Slitting machines, perforating, etc
- Strapping machines, banding machines, etc.
- Weighing machines: check weigher, multihead weigher
- Wrapping machines: flowwrapping, stretch wrapping, shrink wrap
- Form, fill and seal machines, bags, pouches
- Other specialty machinery: slitters, laser cutters, parts attachment, etc.

== Function ==
Packaging is necessary to protect products, and is now done mainly through the use of packaging machinery. Machinery plays increasingly important roles such as:

- Improve labor productivity. Sliding blister sealing machine packaging machinery is much faster than manual packaging. One good example of this is the candy packing machine. Here, hundreds to thousands of candies can be wrapped in minutes.
- Ensure packaging quality. Mechanical packaging is particularly important for exported goods to achieve consistent packaging.
- Handle specialized requirements, such as vacuum packaging, inflatable packaging, skin packaging and pressure filling.
- Reduce labor and improve working conditions for bulky/heavy products.
- Protect workers from health effects brought by dust, toxic/hazardous products and prevent environmental contamination.
- Reduce packaging costs and save storage costs for loose products, such as cotton, tobacco, silk, linen, etc., by simply using compression packaging.
- Reliably ensure product hygiene by eliminating hand contact with food and medicines.

== Gallery ==
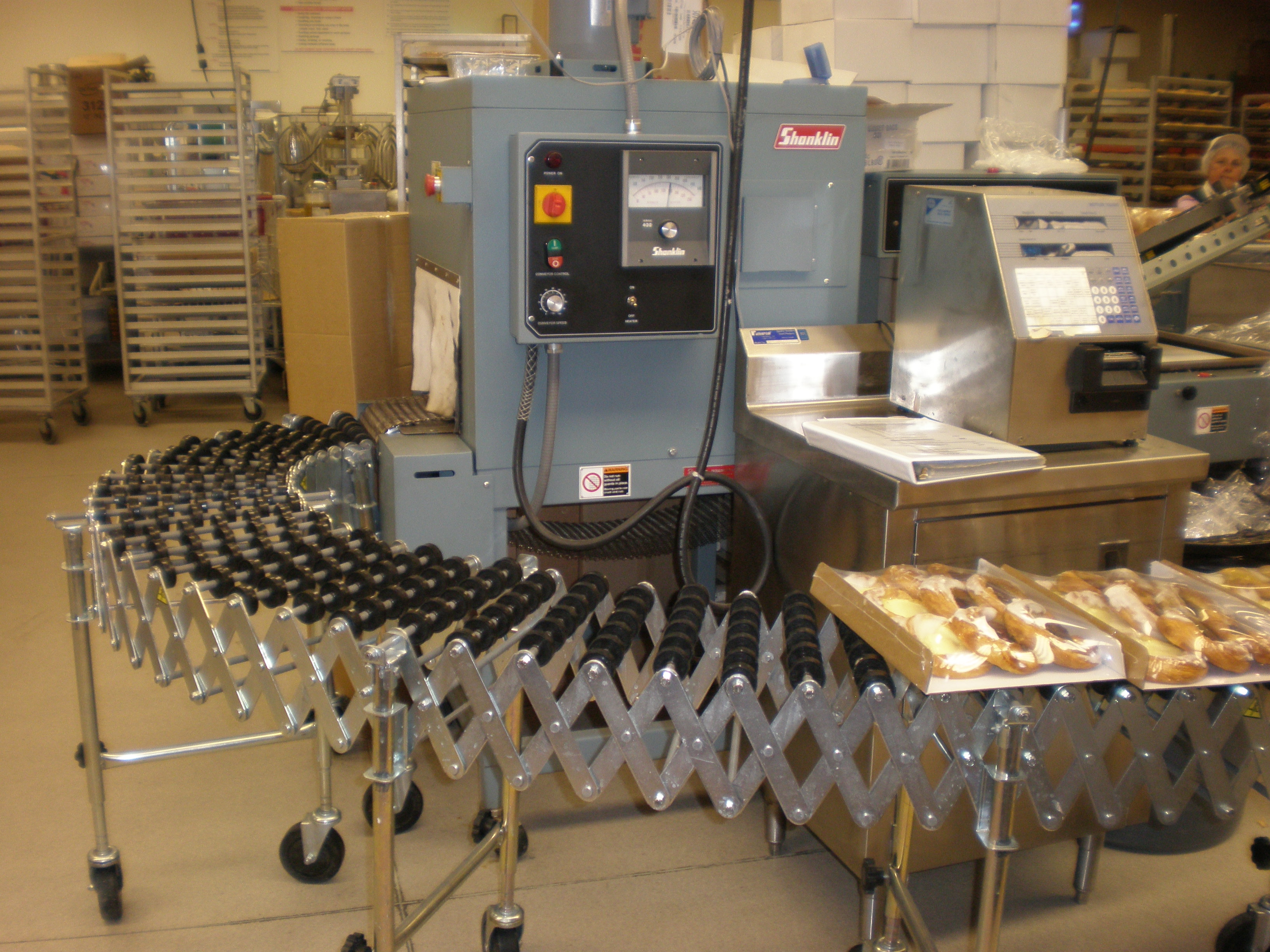
Bakery goods shrinkwrapped by shrink film, heat sealer and heat tunnel on roller conveyor

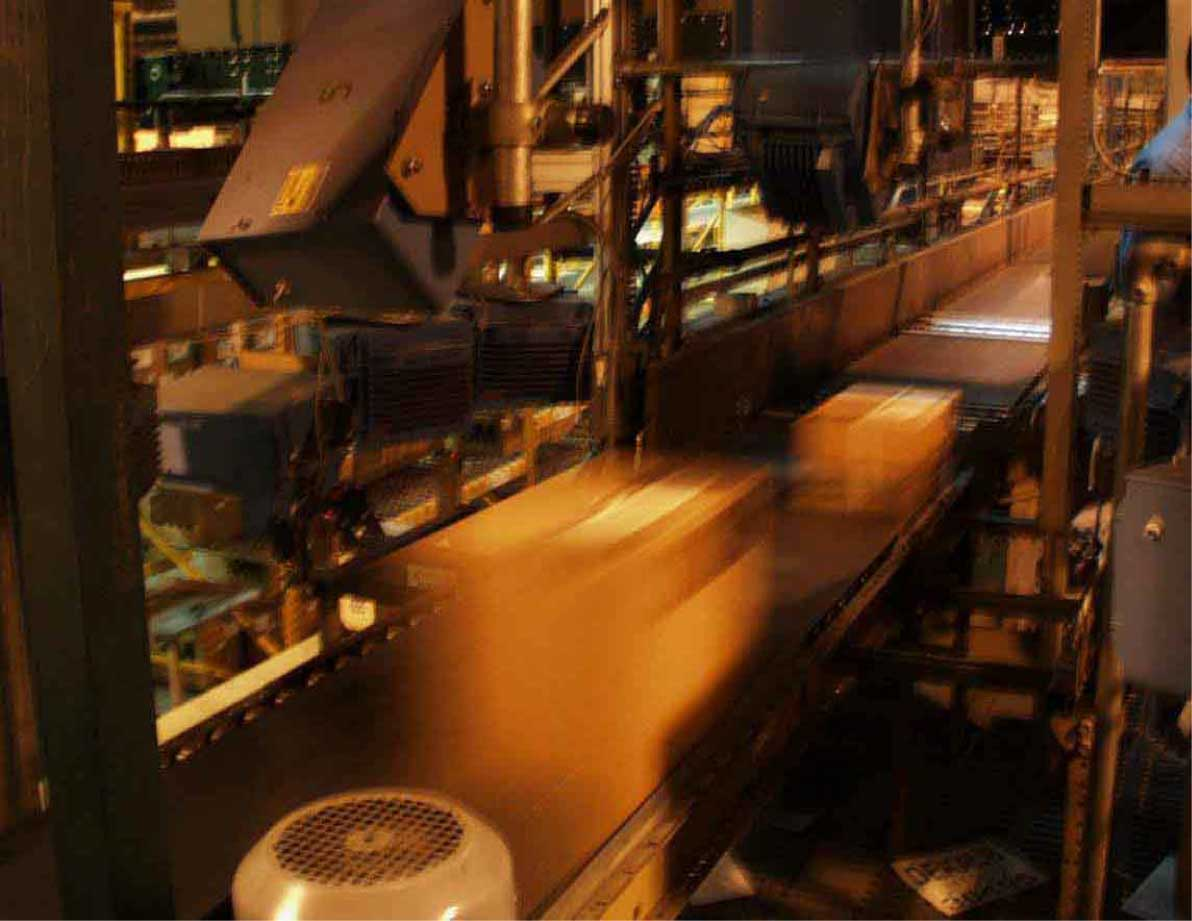
High speed conveyor with stationary bar code scanner for sorting

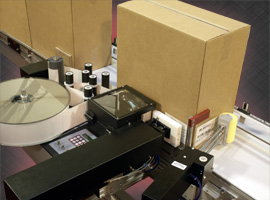
Label printer applicator applying a label to adjacent panels of a corrugated box.

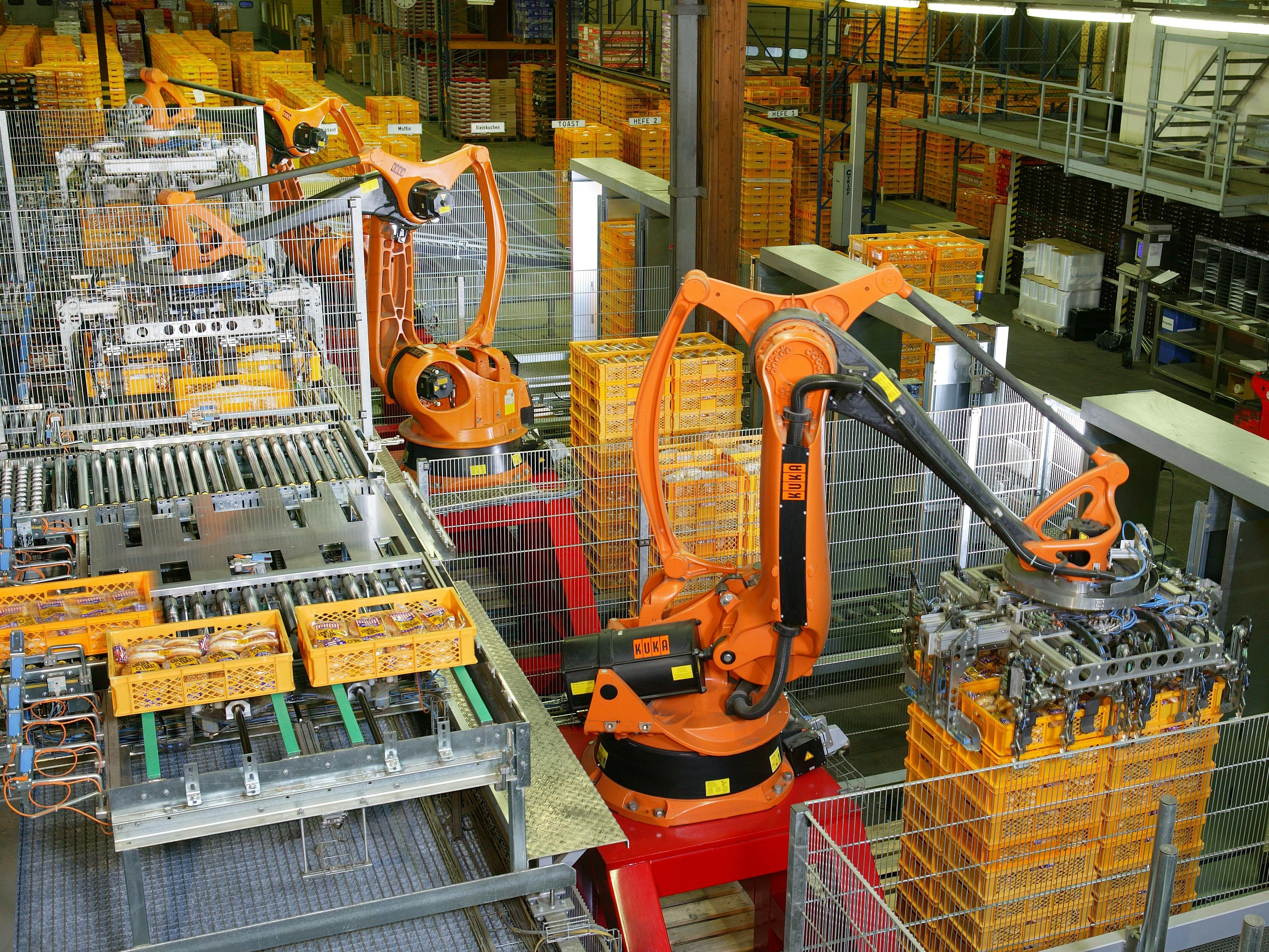
Robots used to palletize bread

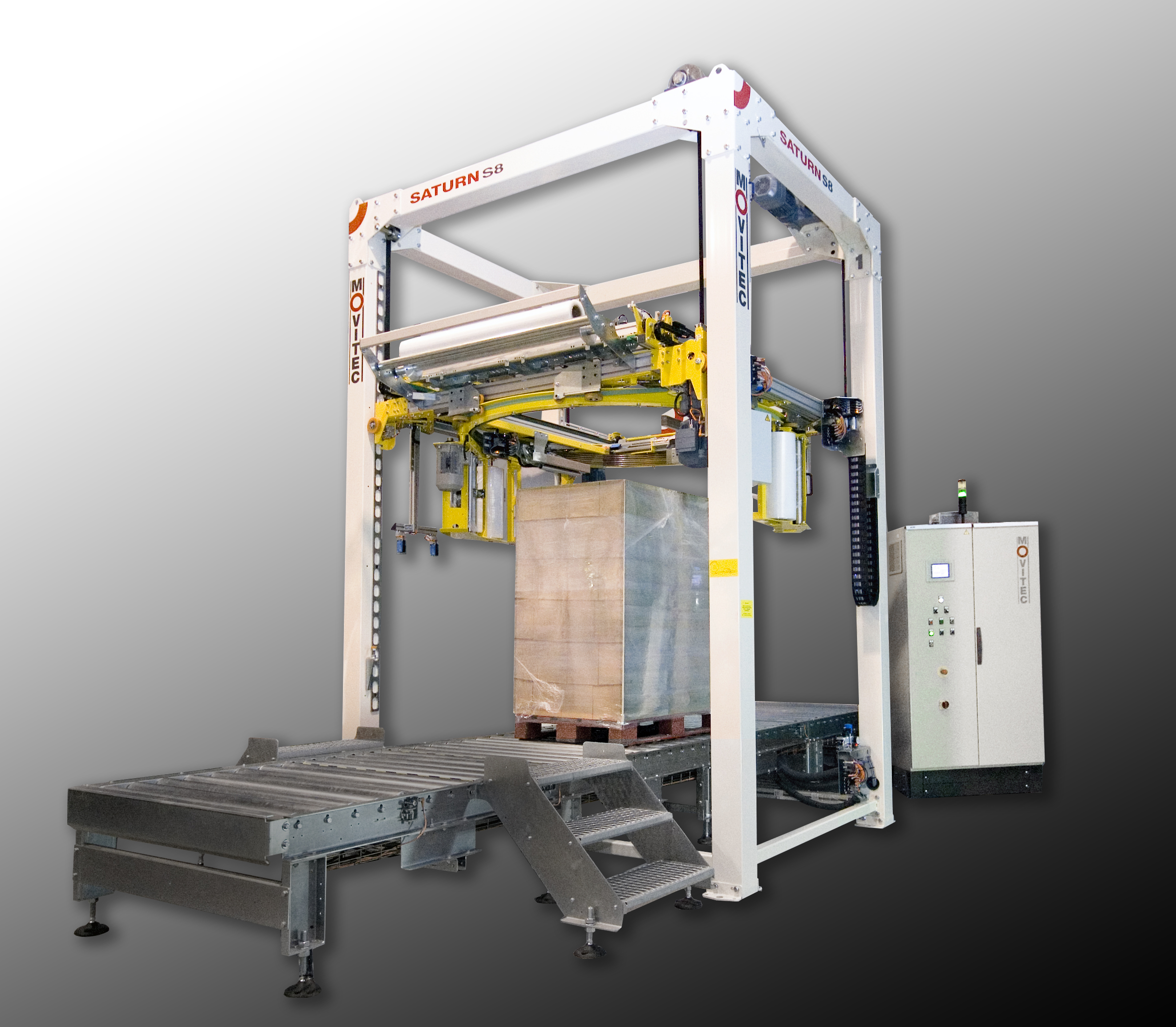
Automatic stretch wrapping machine

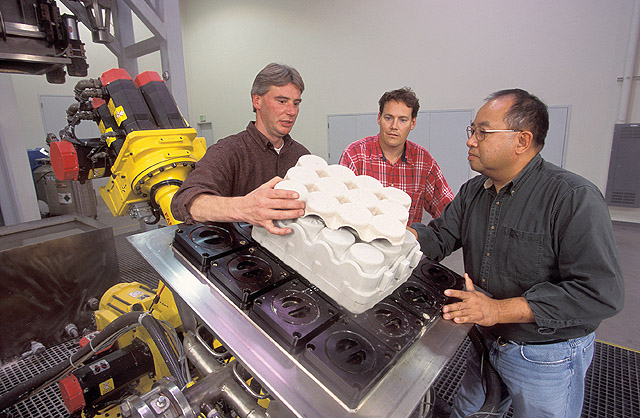
Equipment used for making molded pulp components and molding packaging from straw

A semi-automatic rotary arm stretch wrapper

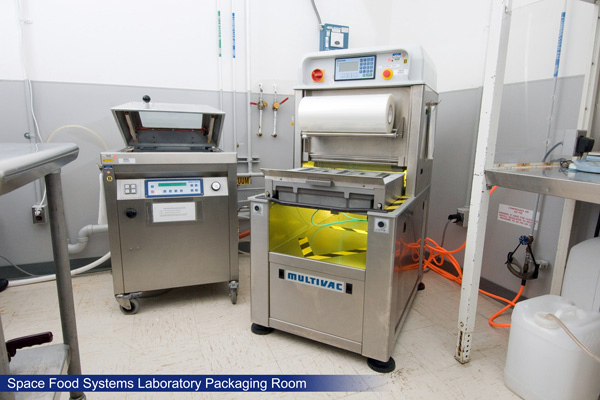
Equipment for thermoforming packages at NASA

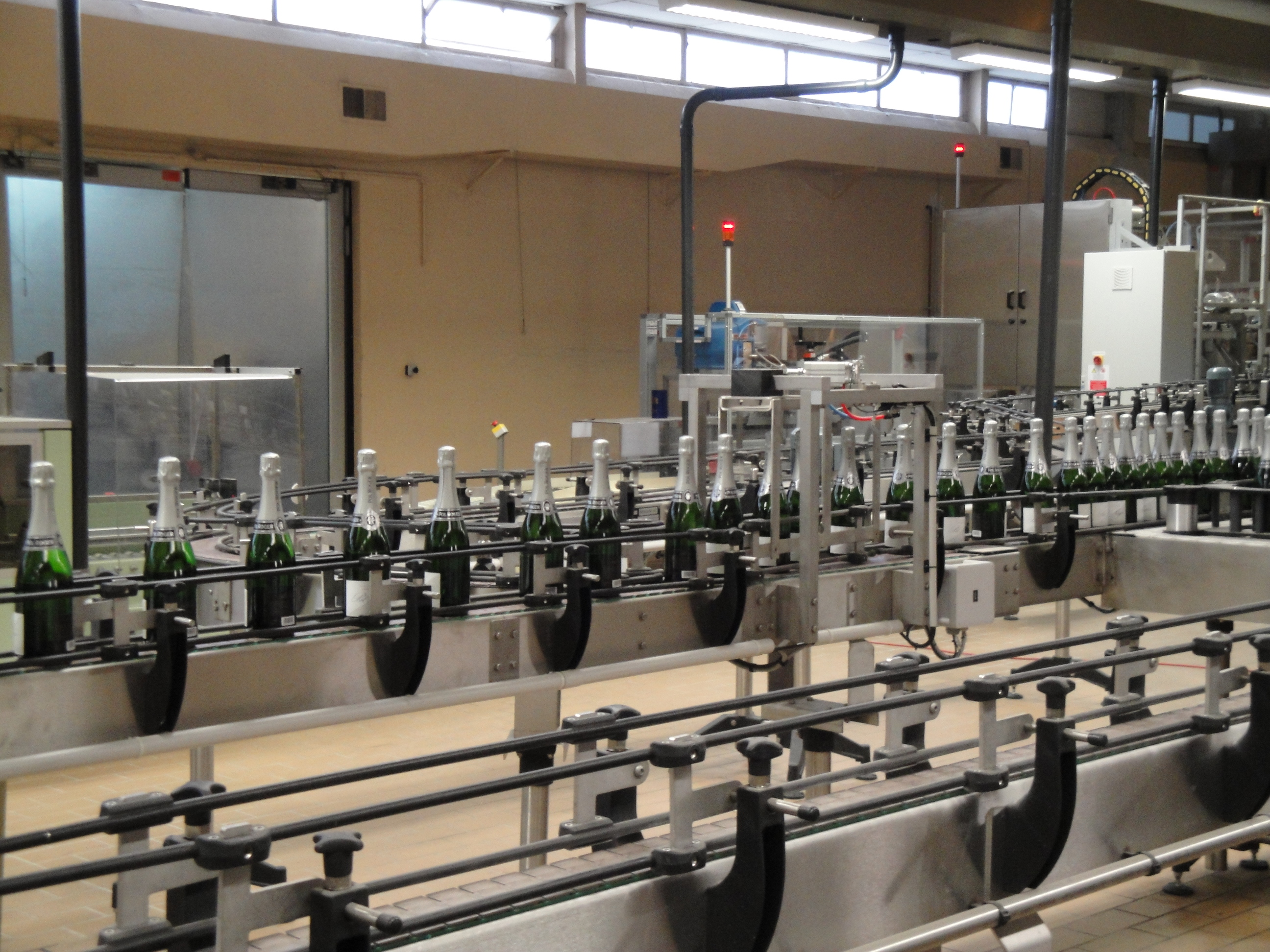
Automated labeling line for wine bottles

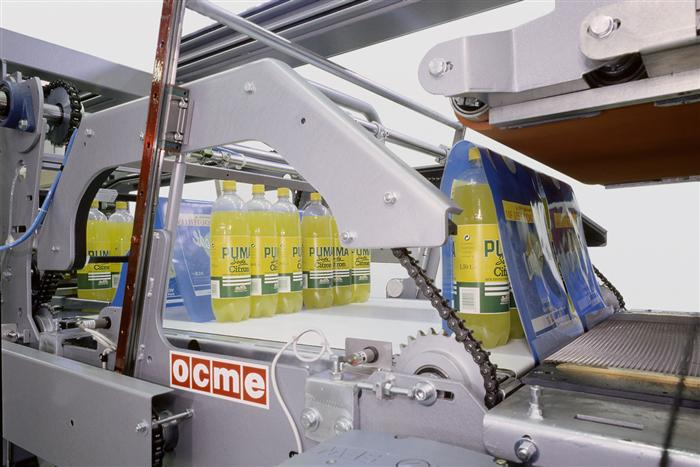
Shrink film wrap being applied on PET bottles

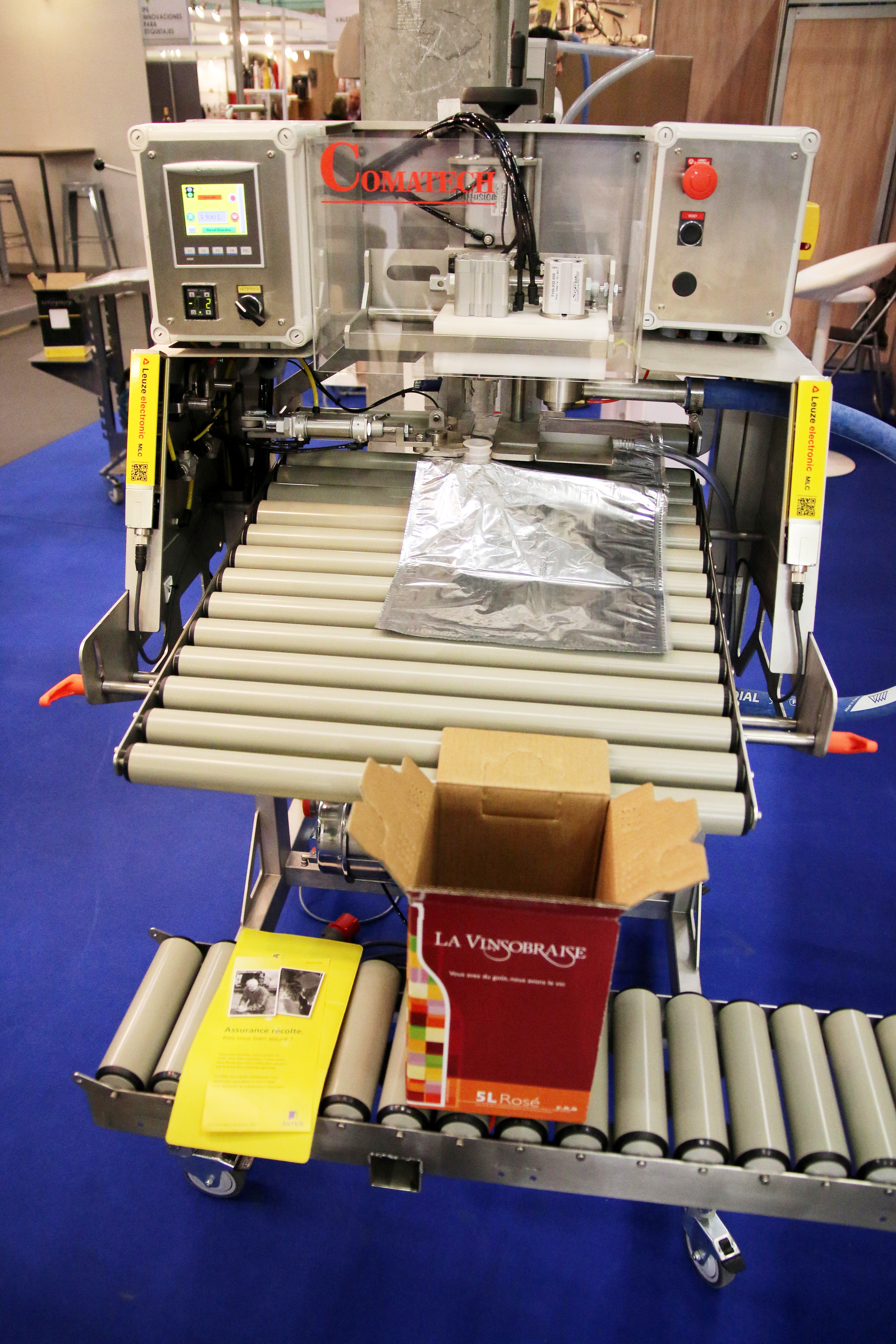
Filling machinery for bag-in-box

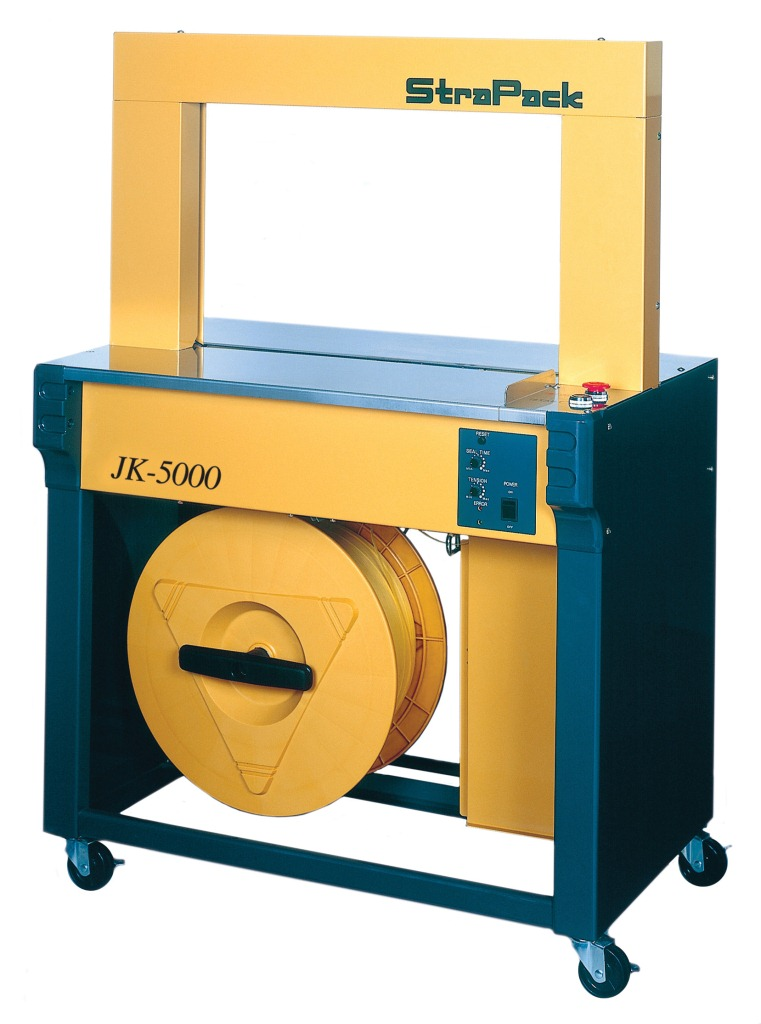
Example, automatic strapping machine

== See also ==
- Clean-in-place
- Cobot
- Hazard analysis and critical control points
- Material-handling equipment
- Packaging Machinery Manufacturers Institute
- Packaging Machinery Technology
- Queueing theory
- SCADA
