= Packaging Machinery Technology =

American business magazine

- Type: Business magazine
- Format: Paper and online magazine
- Owner: Packaging Machinery Manufacturers Institute
- Publisher: Charles Yuska
- Editor: Sean Riley
- Founded: 1963
- Ceased publication: 2017
- Language: English
- Headquarters: Paoli, Pennsylvania, USA
- ISSN: 1556-1658
- Website: PMT magazine

Packaging Machinery Technology (ISSN-1556-1658) was a trade publication and web site owned by PMMI for packaging and packaging machinery manufacturers and packaging engineers in the United States and Canada.

Circulation was about 35,000 copies per issue. The editorial director was Sean Riley, with the editorial offices located in Paoli, Pennsylvania. In 2014, PMMI purchased Summit Media Group and all of its publications. PMT Magazine was rebranded as Packaging + Processing OEM Magazine in 2015. In 2017, it was rebranded again as OEM Magazine.
