= Sun Xianhong =

Sun Xianhong (Simplified: 孙先红; Traditional: 孫先紅; Pinyin: Sūn Xiānhóng;) is a Chinese brand manager and lecturer on marketing best known as the creator of the Little Sheep Group and Mengniu Dairy national brands. He is the co-author of Mengniu Insider.

== Biography ==
Sun Xianhong was born in Inner Mongolia in 1962, and received his bachelor's degree from Shanxi Mining College in July 1985. From October 1988 to April 1994, he served as the cameraman and director at Inner Mongolia Radio and TV University. He was named one of the "China Top 10 Outstanding Marketing Managers" by the International Marketing Festival in January 2003, the "China Top 10 Planning Experts" by the Second China Planning Conference in June 2004, the "China Top 10 Outstanding Brand Managers of the Year" by the Organising Committee of First China Brand Festival in August 2007 and the "Top 50 Brand Leaders" by the China Brand Value Research Centre in March 2007. He has been an independent non-executive Director of 361 Degrees International Limited, a sportswear company that operates over 7263 outlets throughout China, since September 29, 2008. Sun Xianhong currently serves as Chief of Business Development of China Mengniu Dairy Co. Ltd. In 2004, he leveraged the popularity of television hits such as Super Girl (TV series) and the CCTV New Year's Gala, creating an integrated marketing campaign bringing the Mengniu Brand to national prominence. Mr. Xianhong has also been a supervisor in Inner Mongolia Little Sheep Catering Chain Co., Ltd since November 2005, now targeted by Yum Brands, the company behind KFC, for acquisition.
