= Packaging World =

Monthly publication

- Categories: Trade magazine
- Format: Paper and online magazine
- Publisher: Joseph L. Angel
- Founded: 1994
- Company: PMMI Media Group
- Country: USA
- Based in: Chicago, Illinois
- Language: English
- Website: www.packworld.com

Launched in 1994 by Summit Media Group, Inc., Packaging World is a monthly publication which covers the latest developments in packaging. Packaging World reports on packaging machinery and materials and technologies and applications. Monthly coverage includes case histories, news, products, and articles on environmental, regulatory and global packaging issues. Special features on controls and line integration strategies, sustainable packaging, marketing and design, packaging-related Web sites, exclusive packaging surveys and trade shows appear regularly.

The first issue of Packaging World was published in January 1994.

President/Publisher Joseph L. Angel has over 22 years experience in the packaging press and serves on the board of the Clemson University Department of Packaging Science. He is a member of the Institute of Packaging Professionals, the Business Marketing Association, the American Business Media, and the Chicago Area Publisher's Group.

As of November 2017, print circulation of Packaging World was 60,000 subscribers .

Related titles from PMMI Media Group, Inc. include Healthcare Packaging, Contract Packaging (Packaging World sister publication) Automation World and OEM.

In November 2014 PMMI purchased Summit Media Group.
