= Luxury goods of China =

Market segment of China

The market for luxury goods in China composes a significant proportion of all luxury goods sales worldwide. In 2012, China surpassed Japan as the world's largest luxury market. According to a report by McKinsey in 2019, Chinese consumers are the engine of worldwide growth in luxury spending This rapid growth has been explained partly by the luxury consumption habits of the post 1980's generation influenced by the reform and opening up leading to rapid growth in economic conditions and China's one-child policy. Growth of luxury spending in China has slowed significantly in the 2020s, with the market for luxury goods starting to shrink.

== Market characteristics ==
Chinese luxury goods consumers are younger than their European counterparts, belonging to the 18-50 age group, compared to Europe's consumers who are generally in the 40 or over age group. For this reason, China's luxury goods market is expected to grow faster than that of Europe's. Many of the young luxury goods buyers are self-employed or professionals. According to the consulting firm McKinsey & Company, 80% of Chinese luxury goods buyers are under 45, compared with 30% of luxury goods buyers in the United States and 19% in Japan. Retail sales in China account for only 7% of global retail sales of luxury consumer goods; however, Chinese buyers account for 25% of global retail sales of luxury consumer goods. Many shops in international travel destinations have specialized staff devoted to Chinese customers.

According to the 2007 Global Luxury Survey by Time magazine, most luxury goods buyers in China buy luxury products as a status symbol. The top five luxury watch brands in the country are Rolex, Omega, Cartier, Vacheron Constantin, and Breitling.

In a confidential report titled "China Luxury Market study 2010" in November 2010, the management consulting firm Bain & Company noted the top three luxury brands in China are, Chanel, and Gucci. According to the report, watches and bags led to the growth of the luxury market in 2010. The report documented the top three luxury brands in the country for the following products:

Product	1st	2nd	3rd
Cosmetics, perfumes and personal care	Chanel	Lancôme	Dior
Watches	Rolex	Omega	Cartier
Suitcases and handbags	Louis Vuitton	Gucci	Chanel
Menswear	Giorgio Armani	Ermenegildo Zegna	Versace
Jewelry	Cartier	Tiffany and Co	Chow Tai Fook
Shoes	Salvatore Ferragamo	Prada	Chanel
Womenswear	Chanel	Burberry	Giorgio Armani

Following a ban instituted in October 2012 on government agencies purchasing luxury goods, often used as "gifts", sales of luxury goods in China remained strong, but slowed, even falling slightly for some luxury retailers in the 4th quarter of 2012.

As of February 2014, 2/3rds of the luxury goods purchased by the wealthy in the People's Republic of China were purchased by tourists in Europe and the United States where, particularly in Europe, high-end retailers have hired staffed fluent in Mandarin.

Hong Kong and Macau benefit from favorable taxation rules and are favored locations for tourists from elsewhere in China to purchase luxury goods like cosmetics, jewelry, and designer fashion goods.

== Luxury cars ==
Major global luxury brands like Mercedes-Benz, BMW, Audi, and Lexus have operations in China. Audi, which has dominated China's luxury car market for more than two decades, is the market leader in the luxury car segment, with China being Audi's second-largest market in the world. However, Audi's market share in this category is gradually falling as BMW and Mercedes-Benz are adopting new strategies to boost sales. According to data from Global Insight, Audi's market share in China decreased from 66% in 2004 to 42% in 2009, while the market share of BMW and Mercedes-Benz increased from 7% to 23%, and 9% to 16%, respectively. BMW is enlarging its current plant in China and building a second one.

Audi is still the dominant choice of car in the government fleet market. BMW sales are growing but are perceived to be for the newly rich. Mercedes is seen to be for old folks. Brands such as BMW and Audi are designing customized cars for the Chinese luxury car market. BMW designed a model with a longer wheelbase, especially for government officials in order to give the back seat passenger more space.

According to Stephan Winkelmann, CEO of Lamborghini, "China's supercar market is growing faster than our expectations, while the Western markets are declining. The strong demand will soon make China our second biggest market after the United States. If the high taxes on luxury cars are removed, China could very well become the biggest market."

As of 2013, the trend continued as the number of luxury cars and SUVs shown expanded at the Shanghai auto show and plans were announced by both foreign and domestic auto manufacturers to introduce new models in China and increase production of larger cars.

== Watches ==
Swiss shipments of high-end watches, favored as gifts meant to curry favor and caricatured as a symbol of corruption, after peaking in 2012, dropped off in 2013.

== Jewelry ==
In April 2013 sales of gold and jewelry were 72% higher than in April, 2012.

== Other luxury goods ==
The trade in luxury silk goods via the so-called Silk Routes had great importance historically for over a thousand years - from the second century BCE - in the early development of China's trade with the rest of Eurasia.

Porcelain has long been one of China's most important luxury exports. It was especially important to early trade between China and the West, with much of that trade being conducted through Macau.

== See also ==
- Economy of China
- Automotive industry in China
