= DMK Deutsches Milchkontor =

German dairy company

DMK Deutsches Milchkontor GmbH
- Company type: GmbH
- Industry: Food
- Founded: July 1, 2010; 15 years ago
- Headquarters: Zeven, Lower Saxony, Germany
- Products: Dairy
- Revenue: €5.5 billion (2021)
- Owner: Deutsches Milchkontor eG (92%)
- Number of employees: 7,485 (2021)
- Website: dmk.de

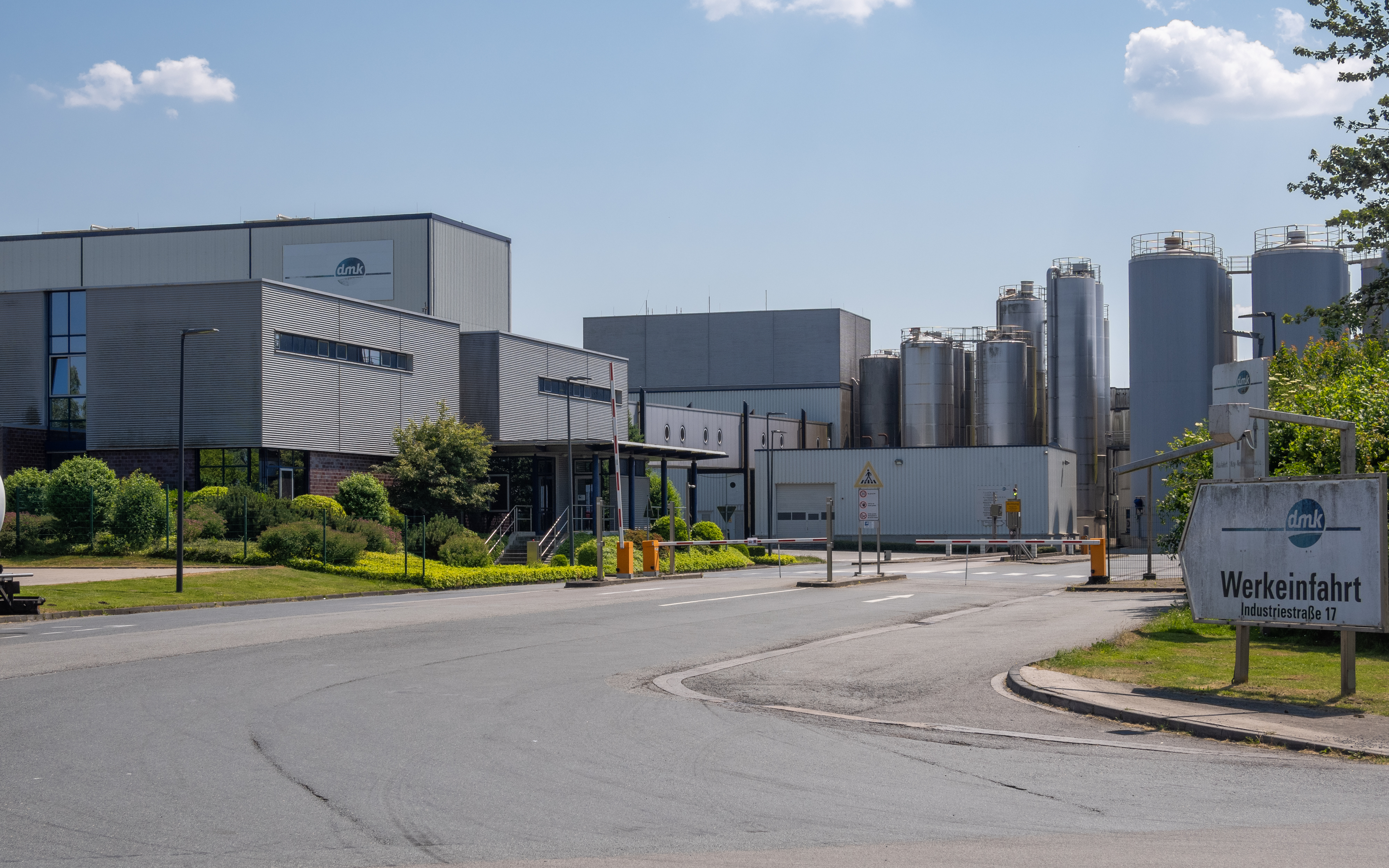
DMK factory in Edewecht

DMK Deutsches Milchkontor GmbH (DMK) is a German dairy company. It was formed in 2011 by the merger of the two cooperatively organized North German companies Humana Milchunion and Nordmilch, which were the two largest German milk processors. With a total revenue of €5.5 billion in 2021, it is one of the 20 largest dairy companies worldwide by turnover.

== History ==
On February 3, 2011, the agricultural representatives of Nordmilch eG approved the merger of Nordmilch AG and Humana Milchindustrie GmbH to form DMK Deutsches Milchkontor GmbH. The members of Humana eG and the Bad Bibra producers' cooperative, as co-owners of Humana Milchindustrie GmbH, had already approved the merger of their operating subsidiary to form Germany's largest milk processor. The merger was legally retroactive to July 1, 2010 and the joint business operations commenced on May 1, 2011. According to press reports, around 6.7 billion kg of milk, produced by over 11,000 farmers, was processed in the companies united under DMK at the time of the merger. The two companies had already planned a merger in 2004, but this fell through. Nevertheless, they worked closely together, among other things by pooling sales in Nordkontor-Milch GmbH in 2009. On March 10, 2012, it was announced that the cooperatives of both companies with their approximately 11,000 members were also to be merged. On June 20, 2012, the representatives of Nordmilch eG and Humana Milchunion eG voted in favor of the merger.

The company acquired a majority stake in the North Rhine-Westphalian company Rosen Eiskrem in November 2012. DMK thus became the largest ice cream producer in Germany. The German Federal Cartel Office approved the takeover of Rosen Eiskrem GmbH in Waldfeucht and Rosen Eiskrem Süd GmbH, based in Nuremberg, on March 27, 2013.

In March 2016, the European Commission unconditionally approved the takeover of the second-largest Dutch cheese producer DOC Kaas by way of a merger. DOC Kaas will become a wholly owned subsidiary, but will operate independently and retain its cooperative structure.

In April 2025, DMK and Danish-Swedish dairy firm Arla Foods agreed to a merger. Representatives for dairy farmers from both cooperatives agreed to the merger on 18 June. The merger was subject to regulatory approval which was given on 28 May 2026 effective per 1 June 2026. The merged cooperative is named Arla and is the largest dairy cooperative in Europe.

== Corporate structure ==
DMK Deutsches Milchkontor is majority owned (over 90%) by the cooperative Deutsches Milchkontor eG.

=== Subsidiaries ===
DMK Deutsches Milchkontor GmbH, Zeven

- DMK Versicherungskontor GmbH, Bremen (100%)
- DMK Baby GmbH, Bremen (100%)
- Milchhof Magdeburg GmbH (100%)
- DP Supply GmbH (100%)
- wheyco GmbH (100%)
- Humana GmbH, Bremen (100%)
- sanotact GmbH (100%)
- sunval Nahrungsmittel GmbH (100%)
- Fude + Serrahn Milchprodukte GmbH & Co. KG (10%)
- Euro Cheese Vertriebs-GmbH

DMK Eis GmbH, Everswinkel (100 %)

- Rosen Eiskrem GmbH (100 %)
- Rosen Eiskrem Süd GmbH (100 %)

== Products ==
DMK is active in the following business areas, among others:

- Cheese
- Dairy products
- Ingredients
- Baby food and dietetics
- Ice cream
- Contract Manufacturing
- Health products
- Specialty feeds

== Criticism ==
Milk producers criticized the fact that the company's new market power means that there are hardly any alternatives left for them.

== Locations ==
Deutsches Milchkontor GmbH has 20 locations in Germany, 2 in the Netherlands and 1 in Voronezh Oblast (Russia) in 2019.
