= Packaging Machinery Manufacturers Institute =

The Association for Packaging and Processing Technologies
- Founded: Aug. 21, 1933
- Type: Trade Association
- Location: Herndon, Virginia
- Members: 900+
- Key people: Jim Pittas, President & CEO
- Website: https://www.pmmi.org/

The Association for Packaging and Processing Technologies (formerly Packaging Machinery Manufacturers Institute) is a trade association representing more than 900 North American manufacturers and suppliers of equipment, components and materials as well as providers of related equipment and services to the packaging and processing industry.

== History ==
In 1933, President Franklin D. Roosevelt enacted the National Industrial Recovery Act (Ch. 90, 48 Stat. 195), which set stringent regulations on industry. Boyd Redner writes in A History of The Packaging Machinery Manufacturers Institute: “The National Industrial Recovery Act spelled out provisions to businessmen … every industry was to come under a code, and the code had two sets of regulations … [1.] regulations spelled out maximum hours that could be worked and the minimum hourly pay … and [2.] they were also to include a stipulation of Fair Trade Practices, so that one employer was required to join some code group.” Thirty five packaging machinery businessmen met in Buffalo, New York, in 1933, to decide whether to form an association that would act as the advocate for the packaging machinery industry to the Department of Labor. Subsequently, PMMI was incorporated in Aug. 21, 1933.

In 1935, after the National Recovery Act was declared unconstitutional by the U.S. Supreme Court, PMMI veered from their mission as a defender of packaging practices against the regulation of the NRA, to a role of homogenizing the packaging processes. Packaging machine designs of that period were the result of individual requirements from the company to the inventor-entrepreneur.

PMMI implicitly brought the inventors together in a forum where they could discuss with each other the business and the industry. “The code proved to us not only that we could work together but that we could also trust one another. It proved further that we were an industry. It gave us a sense of importance of packaging machinery manufacturing that we have never lost.” By 1938, all PMMI members had catalogs on file at the PMMI office at 342 Madison Avenue, New York City, NY, so the office could be a clearinghouse for inquiries. During World War II most PMMI member plants were converted to war work. In 1956, PMMI began producing the PMMI Packaging Machinery Show due to a rising need for packaging machinery by consumer product goods companies. In 1995, PMMI added a second trade show PACK EXPO West, that is now PACK EXPO Las Vegas.

== Membership ==
PMMI offers five membership categories: general, associate, components supplier, materials supplier and affiliated supplier membership.

- General membership - Machinery manufacturers within the United States, Mexico and Canada that are engaged in the manufacturing of processing, packaging or packaging-related converting equipment.
- Associate membership - Machinery manufacturers with a non-manufacturing presence in North America.
- Components Supplier membership - Original manufacturers of commercially available packaging machinery components, who are not engaged in manufacturing, packaging machinery and packaging-related converting machinery.
- Components Materials membership - Original manufacturers of commercially available packaging materials and containers, who are not engaged in manufacturing packaging machinery and packaging-related converting machinery.
- Affiliated Supplier membership - Suppliers to the packaging and processing industry that do not supply components for the build of machinery (i.e., integrators, engineering, design and construction services).

== Events ==
As the owner and producer of the PACK EXPO portfolio of trade shows, PMMI is responsible for the following industry-wide events in the US, PACK EXPO Las Vegas, PACK EXPO International (Chicago), Healthcare Packaging EXPO (co-located with PACK EXPO Las Vegas and PACK EXPO International), PACK EXPO East and ProFood Tech. In Mexico PMMI organizes EXPO PACK México and EXPO PACK Guadalajara.

In 2013 PMMI formed a strategic partnership with Cologne Trade Fair (Koelnmesse), the organizer of Anuga FoodTec, ProSweets Cologne, International FoodTec India and International FoodTec Brazil.

== Education ==
PMMI U is the education section of the Institute. In 1966, PMMI initiated its first Education Committee to expand the packaging education program nationwide. Today, PMMI U annually donates $100,000 to packaging students, member employees, and packaging schools. PMMI U has partnered with 28 institutions in the United States and Canada that offer packaging and processing curriculum. PMMI U has also partnered with the Mid Atlantic Mechantronic Advisory Council and several packaging and technical schools to develop a series of Certificate Programs focused on Mechatronics.

== ANSI Standards ==
In response to the National Product Liability Act of 1977, PMMI Product Safety Committee and the American National Standards Institute created ANSI B155.1-1973 – Safety Requirements for the Construction, Care, and Use of Packaging and Packaging-Related Converting Machinery for use in future litigation.

== See also ==
- Packaging Machinery Technology
