= Schreiber Foods =

American dairy company

Coordinates: 44°31′01″N 88°00′46″W

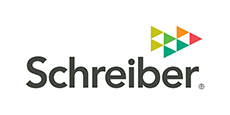
- Type: Private
- Founded: 1945
- Founder: L.D. Schreiber
- Headquarters: Green Bay, Wisconsin
- Key people: Ron Dunford, President & CEO
- Products: Dairy products
- Number of employees: 10,000+
- Website: www.SchreiberFoods.com

Schreiber Foods Inc., is a dairy company which produces and distributes natural cheese, processed cheese, cream cheese, yogurt and beverages. It is an employee-owned customer brand dairy company headquartered in Green Bay, Wisconsin. With more than $7 billion in annual sales, Forbes ranked Schreiber Foods as the 81st largest private employer in 2016.

== Company history ==
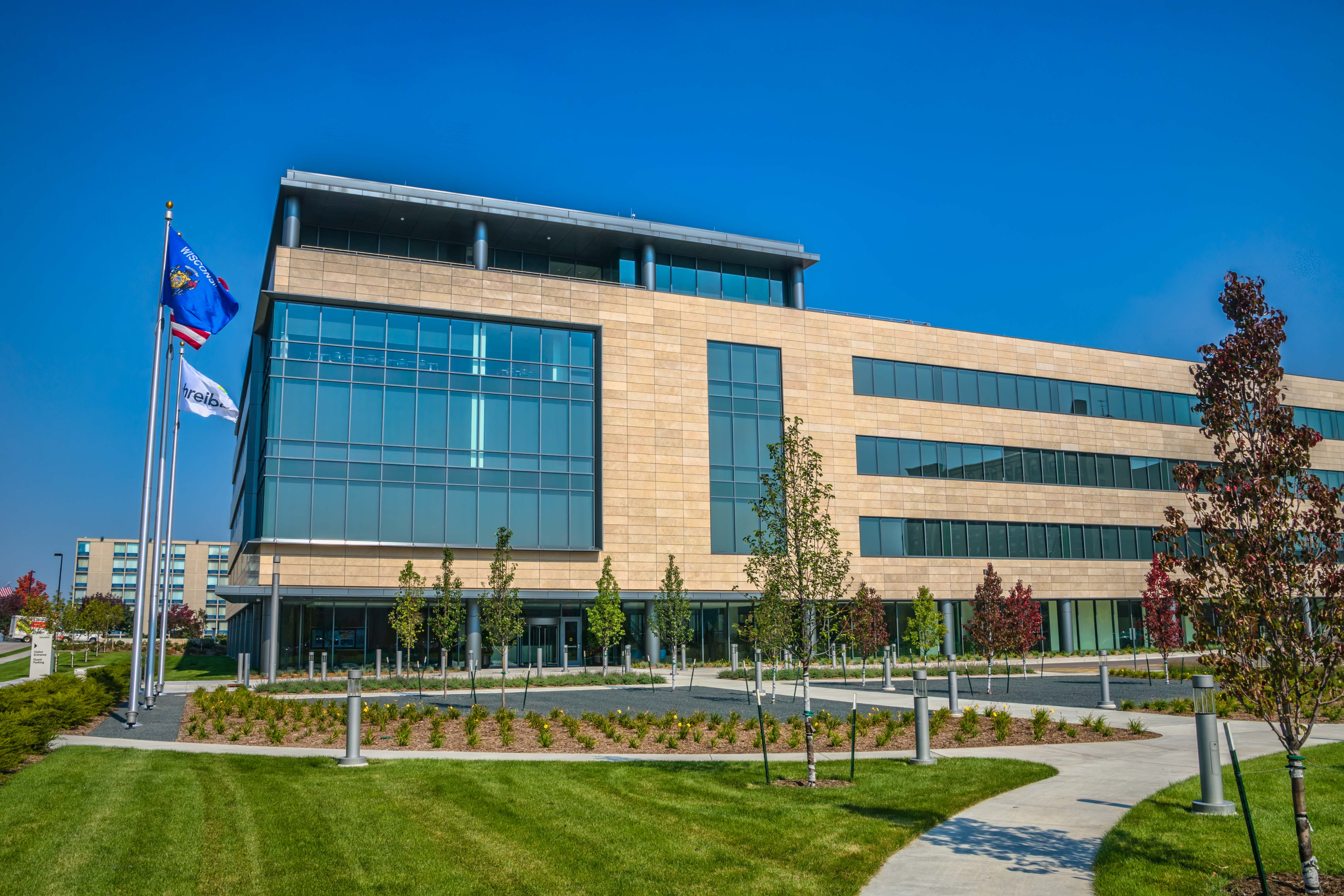
Schreiber Foods Headquarters in downtown Green Bay, Wisconsin

Schreiber Foods was founded in 1945 when L.D. Schreiber, in partnership with Merlin G. Bush and Daniel D. Nusbaum, started the L.D. Schreiber Cheese Company with its original plant in Green Bay, Wisconsin. In 1950, Schreiber Foods opened a second cheese plant in Carthage, Missouri. Schreiber added two more plants in the 1970s in Logan, Utah, and Monett, Missouri. In 2000, Schreiber purchased the Beatrice Foods plant in Waukesha, Wisconsin. It closed that plant employing 170 in 2002. Schreiber purchased Pinnacle Cheese in Pittsburgh, Pennsylvania, in 2000. It closed the plant employing 100 in 2003. Schreiber purchased Raskas Foods in St. Louis, Missouri, in 2002. It closed the St Louis plant employing 220 in 2005, while maintaining plants in Texas and Pennsylvania.

By the end of 2000, six more were added to include additional operations in Missouri, Arizona and Wisconsin. Since then, they've expanded to include domestic plants in Pennsylvania, Texas, California and Utah, in addition to international operations in Austria, Brazil, France, Germany, India, Mexico, Portugal, Spain, Bulgaria, Czech Republic and Slovakia.

In 1962, Schreiber sold the cheese operation to 13 employees, including Bush and Nusbaum. As the company began to expand into products other than cheese, the L.D. Schreiber Company changed its name to Schreiber Foods Inc. in 1980. Then in 1999, Schreiber created an Employee Stock Ownership Plan (ESOP), turning ownership of the company over to all of its employees, or partners.

== Cheese production ==
Schreiber produces customer brand process, natural and cream cheeses and yogurt for restaurants, grocery stores and food service distributors. Schreiber is the United States' second-largest producer of cream cheese and one of the largest yogurt producers. Schreiber produces cheese slices that are used on cheeseburgers by 17 of the top 20 hamburger chains.

== Employees ==
Schreiber employs more than 9,000 people worldwide. It is headed by President and CEO Trevor Farrell, Chairman Mike Haddad and CFO Chip Smoot. Chad Wiegand is the General Counsel. Ownership of the company was transferred to employees in the form of an ESOP (employee stock ownership plan) in 1999.

== Locations ==
The company is headquartered in Green Bay, Wisconsin. It has 12 United States production facilities in eight states: Arizona, Arkansas, California, Missouri, Pennsylvania, Texas, Utah, and Wisconsin; five of these are distribution centers. There are also 12 international production facilities in 10 countries: Austria, Brazil, Bulgaria, Czech Republic, Germany, India, Mexico, Portugal, Slovakia, Spain,

Schreiber North American locations have the ability to process cheese & natural cheese in these cities: Carthage, Clinton, Green Bay, Logan, Monett, Mt Vernon, Shippensburg, Smithfield, Stephenville, Tempe, West Bend, and León.

Schreiber North American locations have the ability to distribute in these cities: Carthage, De Pere, Fullerton, Logan, Richland Center, Shippensburg, Stephenville, and West Bend. Schreiber North American locations have the ability to make yogurt in these cities: Fullerton, Logan, Richland Center, and Shippensburg. Schreiber North American has a business office in this location: Bentonville.

Schreiber South American locations have the ability to process cheese & natural cheese in this city: Rio Azul.

Schreiber European locations have the ability to process cheese & natural cheese in these cities: Stonehouse, Gloucestershire, Hörbranz, Lindenberg, and Wangen. Schreiber European locations have the ability to make yogurt in these cities: Sofia, Benešov, Castelo Branco, Zvolen, Noblejas, Santa Cruz de Tenerife, and Talavera de la Reina. Schreiber European locations have the ability to make various dairy products in these cities: Zvolen. Schreiber European location has a business office in this location: Madrid.

Schreiber Asian locations produce various cheese and dairy products in these locations: Baramati, Fazilka, Kuppam.
