= Mengniu Dairy =

Chinese dairy products company

Inner Mongolia Mengniu Dairy (Group) Limited by Share Ltd.
- Type: Public
- Traded as: SEHK: 2319; Hang Seng Index component
- Industry: Dairy
- Founded: 1995; 31 years ago
- Headquarters: Hohhot, Inner Mongolia, China (corporate headquarters); Cayman Islands (legal domicile)
- Key people: Ning Gaoning (Chairman)
- Products: Dairy products ice cream
- Revenue: ▲US$2.04 billion
- Number of employees: 30,000
- Website: www.mengniu.com.cn

Mengniu Dairy
- Simplified Chinese: 内蒙古蒙牛乳业（集团）股份有限公司
- Traditional Chinese: 內蒙古蒙牛乳業(集團)股份有限公司
- Literal meaning: Inner Mongolia Mongolian Cow Milk Business Group Joint-Stock Limited Company
Transcriptions
Standard Mandarin
- Hanyu Pinyin: Nèiměnggǔ Měngniú Rǔ Yè (Jítuán) Gǔfèn yǒuxiàngōngsī

Inner Mongolia Mengniu Dairy (Group) Limited by Share Ltd. (Chinese: 蒙牛; lit. 'Mongolian Cow') is a Chinese manufacturing and distribution company of dairy products and ice cream. The company is headquartered in Hohhot, Inner Mongolia and manufactures dairy products under the Mengniu brand.

Mengniu's main competitor in China is the Yili Group. COFCO Corporation is Mengniu's largest strategic shareholder.

== Products ==
Mengniu's products include liquid milk products, such as ultra heat treated (UHT) milk, yogurt and milk beverages, ice cream and other dairy products, such as powdered milk and milk tablets. During the year that ended on 31 December 2015, the company operated 33 production bases with an aggregate annual production capacity of 8.68 million tons. China Mengniu Dairy Company Limited's operates in three segments: the liquid milk products segment, which manufactures and distributes processed UHT milk, milk beverages and yogurt; the ice cream products segment, which manufactures and distributes ice cream products, and the other dairy products segment, which manufactures and distributes processed milk powder and milk tablets products.

== History ==
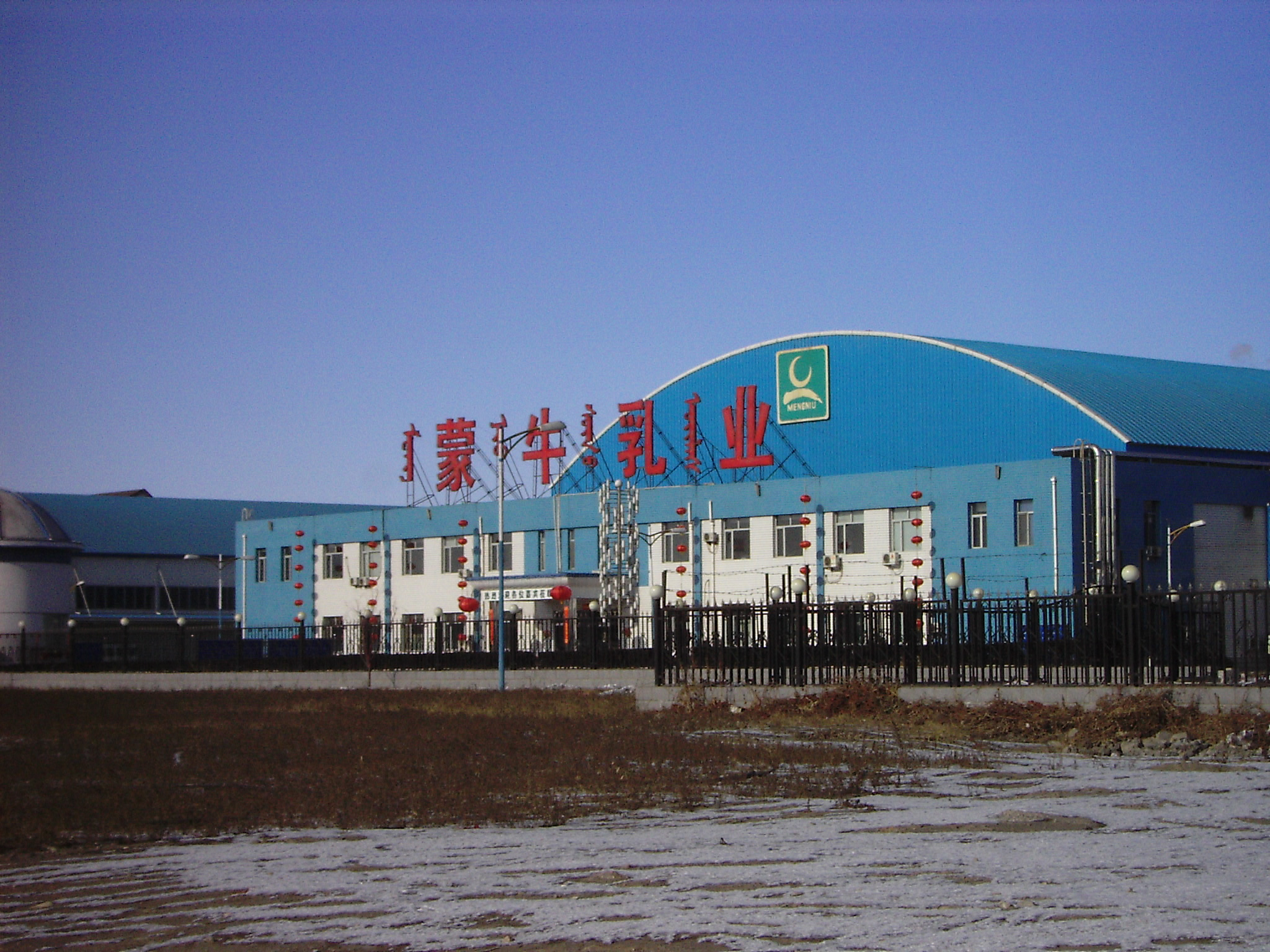
Mengniu factory in Qingshan District, Inner Mongolia.

The owner and co-founder of Mengniu is Niu Gensheng, a former vice president of Yili, another Inner Mongolian dairy giant which is now Mengniu's largest competitor. Co-founder Sun Xianhong has also held the Vice President of Marketing position. The company was founded in 1999. In 2002, Morgan Stanley, CDH Investments and China Capital Partners signed agreement with Mengniu to invest US$26m for a total share of 32% in the company. Mengniu then went on to be listed on the Hong Kong Stock Exchange (SEHK) in June 2004.

When Mengniu had financial trouble as the result of business following its role in the 2008 Chinese milk scandal, in July 2009, Mengniu sold a 20% stake to a consortium led by the state-owned COFCO Group, China's largest importer and exporter of food. That sale made the state the largest shareholder and effectively nationalized the company.

== Advertising ==
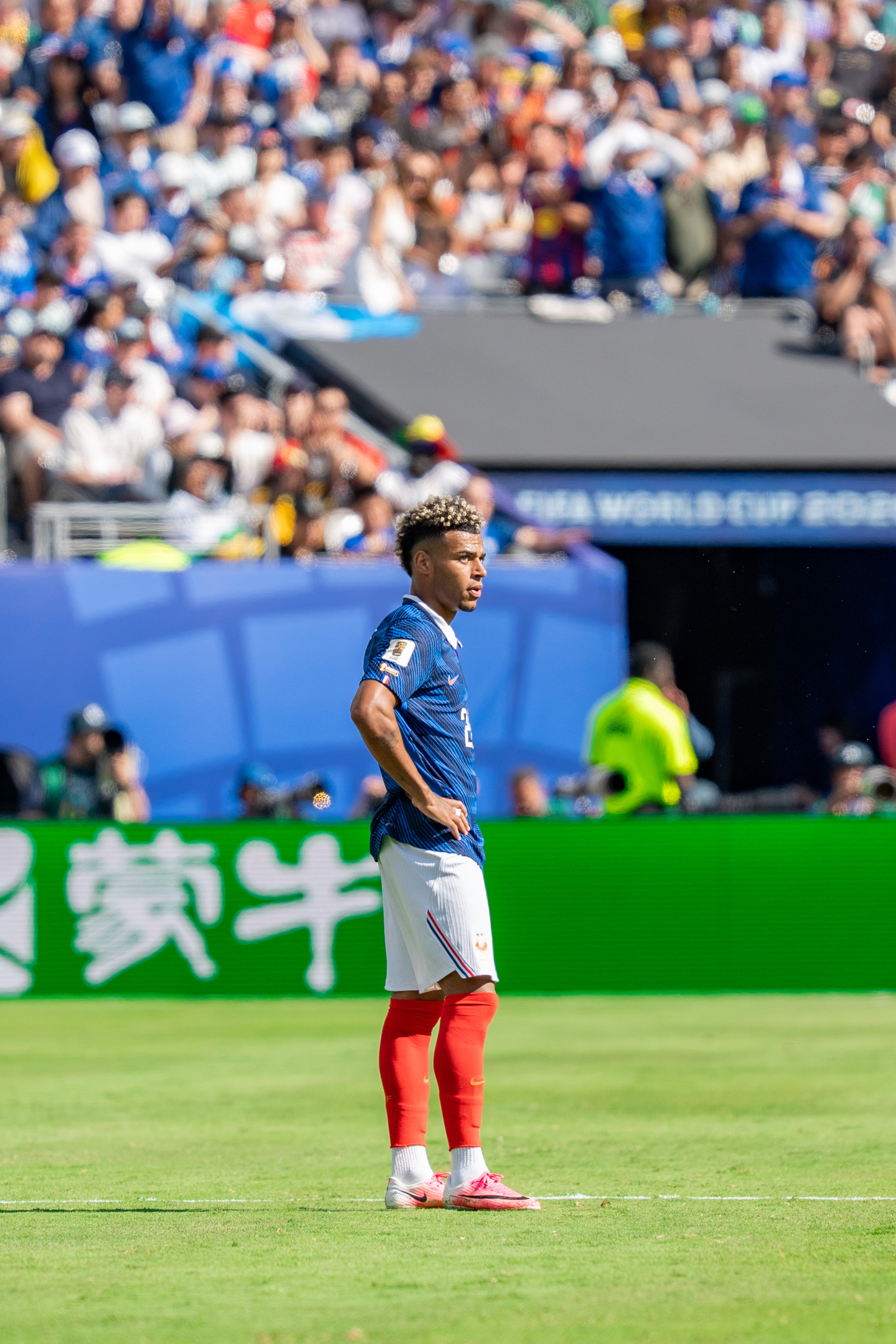
Mengniu advertising is seen behind Désiré Doué during the 2026 FIFA World Cup

The company is a leading manufacturer of milk, yogurt and other dairy products in mainland China, partly due to its high-profile advertising campaigns. One such campaign advertised "special milk for China's astronauts" after the successful launches of the Shenzhou 5 and Shenzhou 6 spacecraft (in fact the company sponsors the Chinese space program), and Mengniu also sponsored the popular SuperGirl contest. SuperGirl Zhang Hanyun (aka Baby Zhang) became associated with Mengniu's brand, appearing in Mengniu's commercials, which became instrumental in her elevation to fame. In marketing campaigns, it also uses the slogan "中國牛 世界牛 蒙牛", which metaphorically means "Mengniu will be outstanding in Inner Mongolia, be outstanding in China and world". The company has now become a symbol of entrepreneurship in China. Mengniu has also sponsored three consecutive FIFA World Cups: 2018, 2022, and 2026.

== 2008 Chinese milk scandal ==
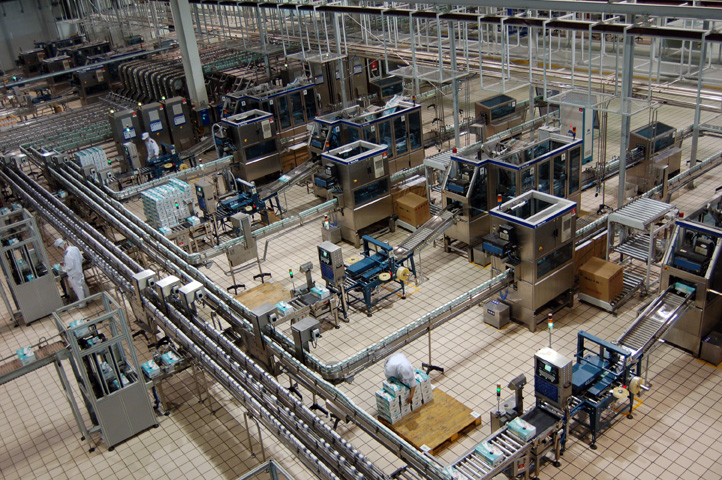
Mengniu production line in plant near Hohhot, Inner Mongolia

Mengniu was among those named for having powdered milk samples which tested positive for melamine. The company recalled tainted powdered milks and apologised to the public. Trading in Mengniu shares on the Hong Kong Stock Exchange was suspended on 17 September. Shares in other dairy companies fell strongly the next day. On discovery that their liquid milk was also contaminated, Mengniu was stripped of its status as 'Chinese national brands'.

Mengniu, whose products tested negative in Hong Kong government tests, was immediately de-listed by supermarket chains after tests showed that contaminated samples had been found on the mainland. Mengniu's CFO attempted to reassure consumers by offering a no-quibble refund on all products, and by drinking liquid milk in front of reporters. He also said that its export products were less likely to be contaminated. This comment spurred accusations on Internet bulletin boards that the company's preferential export policies was because it thought Chinese lives were cheaper than foreigners'.

On 17 September 2008, Hong Kong Stock Exchange suspended trading in shares of China Mengniu Dairy Co. Ltd.

In 2011 Mengniu Dairy stated that moldy cattle feed led to excessive toxin levels in its milk.

== Mengniu Arla ==
In 2006, China Mengniu Co. Ltd teamed up with Arla Foods, the largest producer of dairy products in Scandinavia, to produce and distribute solid milk products in China, including Hong Kong and Macau. The Chinese dairy products maker said it would hold 50 percent of the venture, while Arla Foods would own 48 percent. The joint venture company was named Mengniu Arla.

After the company's products tested positive for melamine, CEO Peder Tuborgh, Arla Foods, said: "The situation is extremely distressing for all the families who need milk of the highest quality to feed their children. It is extremely important that we get to the bottom of the problem so that consumers' safety can be guaranteed and confidence in the Chinese dairy industry maintained, together with Mengniu and the authorities, we're doing everything we can to safeguard quality."
