= Yili Group =

Chinese dairy products company

Yili Group 伊利集团
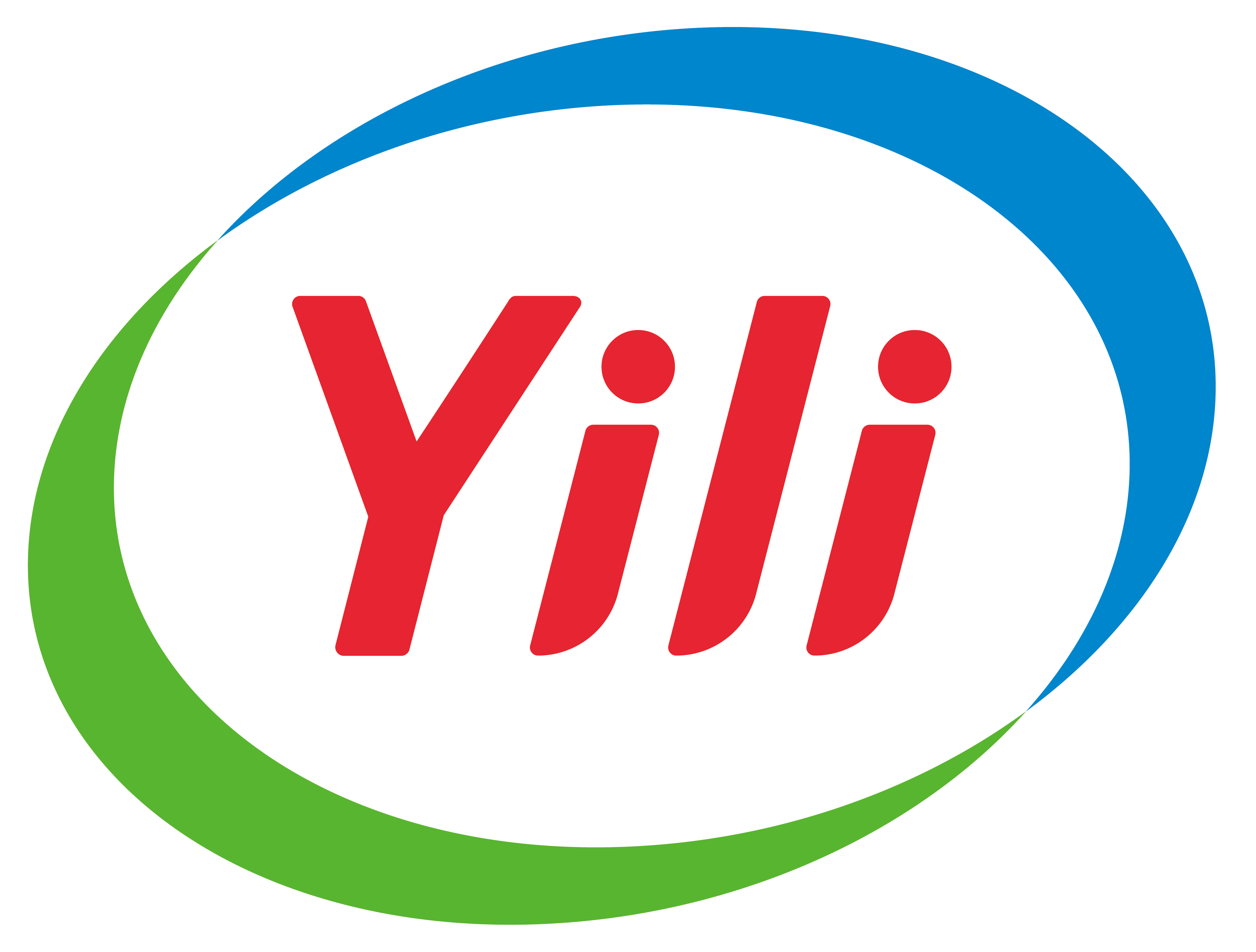

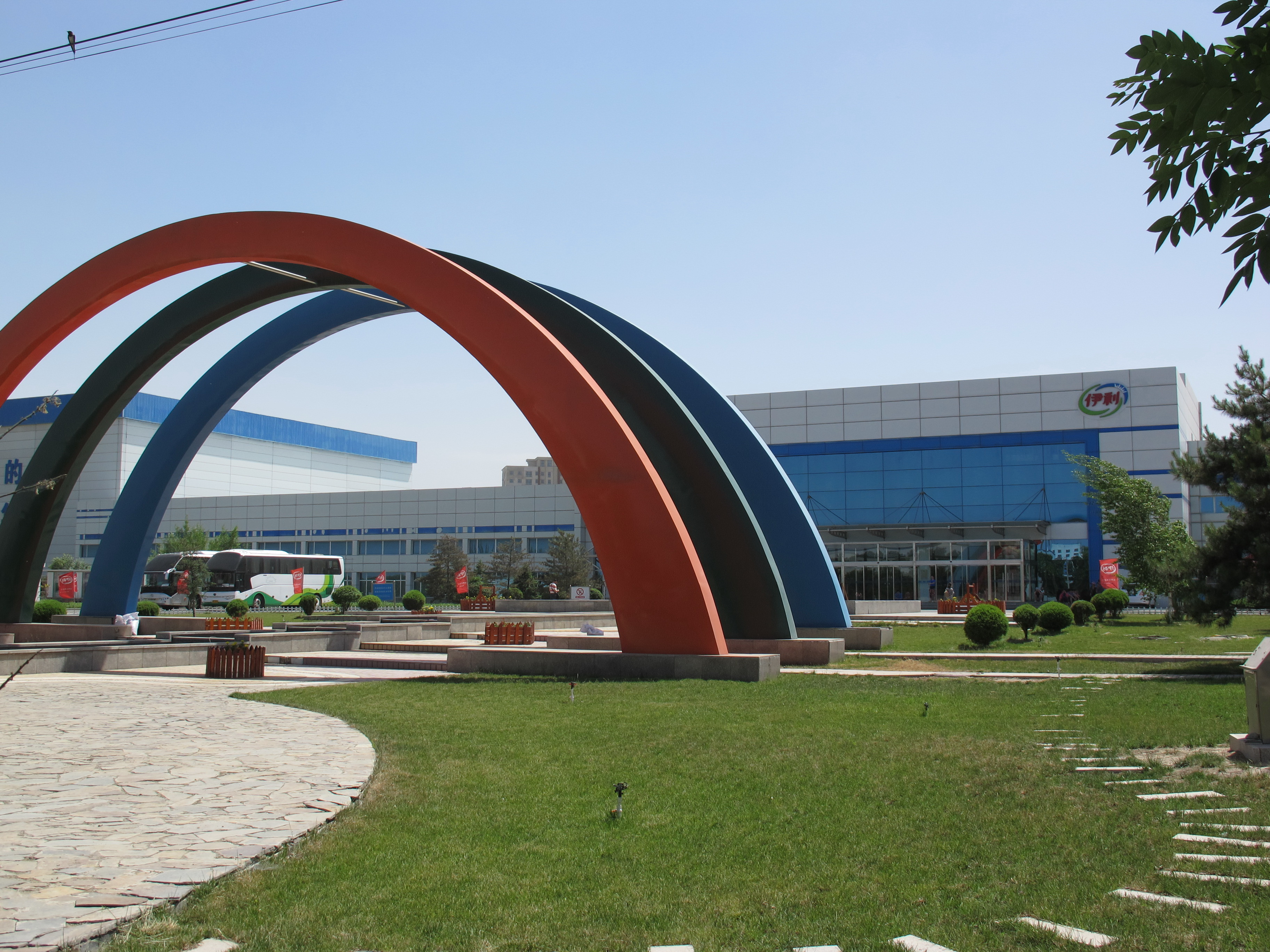
- Yili Office in Hohhot
- Type: Public; partly state-owned
- Traded as: SSE: 600887; CSI A50
- Industry: Dairy
- Founded: 1993; 33 years ago
- Headquarters: Hohhot, Inner Mongolia, China
- Key people: Pan Gang (Chairman)
- Products: Dairy products
- Brands: Joyday; Pro-Kido; Satine

Chinese name
- Traditional Chinese: 內蒙古伊利實業集團股份有限公司
- Simplified Chinese: 内蒙古伊利实业集团股份有限公司
Transcriptions
Standard Mandarin
- Hanyu Pinyin: Nèi Měnggǔ Yīlì Shíyè Jítuán Gǔfènyǒuxiàngōngsī
- Website: www.yili.com

Yili Group (Chinese: 伊利集团; pinyin: Yīlì Jítuán; full name: Inner Mongolia Yili Industrial Group Company Limited) is a Chinese dairy products producer headquartered in Hohhot, Inner Mongolia. It is listed as an A share company on the Shanghai Stock Exchange (SSE). It is engaged in processing and manufacturing of milk products, including ice cream under "Joyday" brand, milk tea powder, sterilized milk and fresh milk under "Yili" brand, powdered milk under "Pro-Kido" brand, and organic milk under "Satine" brand. In 2018, it was the world's third best-performing food brands. In 2021, Yili ranked 1st on FBIF's Top 100 Chinese Food & Beverage Companies list. It is partly state-owned by the government of Hohhot (8.5% as of 2024).

Its head office is in the Jinshan Development Zone (金山开发区) in Hohhot.

The company was an official sponsor and exclusive dairy products supplier of the 2008 Beijing Olympics, 2022 Winter Olympics and 2022 Asian Games.

== History ==
In 1956, "the Cattle Breeding Team of Hohhot Huimin District" was established. In 1958, it was renamed as "the Cooperative Dairy Farm of Hohhot Huimin District", which was the predecessor of the Yili Group.

In February 1997, the Yili Group was formally established and put into production the first production line of Tetra Pak Milk.

In 2008, Yili Group was involved in a food safety scandal, the 2008 Chinese milk scandal. The scandal involved melamine-contaminated milk, baby milk powder, and other milk products. The incident caused 13,000 infants to have kidney stones in China and in neighboring countries and regions who consumed the contaminated milk products.

On 18 March 2019, the group signed an agreement to acquire 100% equity of New Zealand dairy co-operative Westland Milk Products – which was ratified by Westland shareholders on 4 July.

In December 2023, Yili Group established an internal militia unit reporting to the People's Liberation Army within the company.

== See also ==
- Chicecream
- Mengniu Dairy
