= Direct-to-disc =

Direct-to-disc or direct-to-disk (sometimes not hyphenated) may refer to:

- Direct-to-disc recording, an analog audio recording method
- Direct to Disc (FM album), 1978
- Direct to Disc (Crossfire album), 1978
- Direct-to-disc releasing, the distribution of feature films via DVD and Blu-ray, without a prior theatrical release
- Direct-to-disc printing, the means by which an inkjet printable DVD has a label printed directly onto its surface with a specially designed inkjet printer
- Direct-to-disk recording (DDR), a recording method by which audio and/or video signals are recorded directly to digital storage media (e.g. a hard disk drive)
