= Dymo Corporation =

American manufacturing company

- Type: Subsidiary
- Industry: Printing
- Founded: June 1958; 68 years ago in Berkeley, California
- Founder: Rudolph Hurwich
- Headquarters: United States
- Products: Handheld label printers, handheld embossing tape label makers
- Brands: XTL; ColorPop!; LabelWriter; LabelManager; Rhino; LetraTag
- Parent: Newell Brands
- Website: dymo.com

Dymo Corporation is an American manufacturing company of handheld label printers and thermal-transfer printing tape as accessory, embossing tape label makers, and other printers such as CD and DVD labelers and durable medical equipment.

The company is a subsidiary of Newell Brands.

== History ==
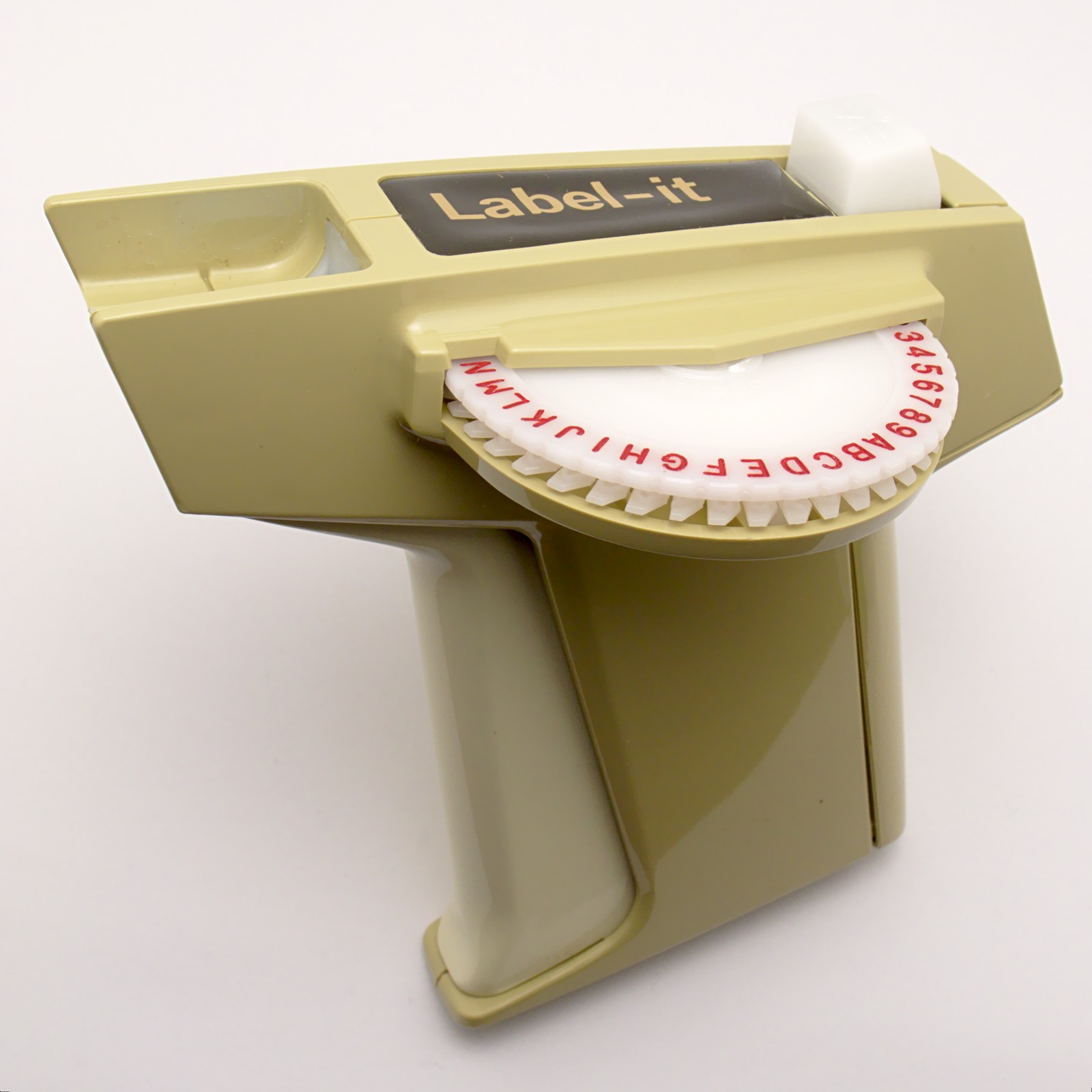
Dymo embossing tape label maker around 1967

Dymo Industries, Inc. was founded in 1958 to produce handheld tools that use embossing tape. The embossing tape and handheld plastic embossing labeler was invented by David Souza from Oakland, California.

Dymo was acquired by Esselte in 1978, and battery-powered printers became a major product after 1990. On June 1, 1998, CoStar Corporation, the manufacturer of the LabelWriter brand of thermal label printers, was acquired by Esselte Office Products. Although CoStar remained independent at first, it would later be folded into Dymo, initially as Dymo-CoStar, and later simply as Dymo, dropping the "CoStar" moniker altogether.

The Dymo Corporation would later be sold to Newell Rubbermaid in 2005.

== Label sizes ==
Following is a list of the label sizes popular for their LabelWriter (400, 450) printer series:

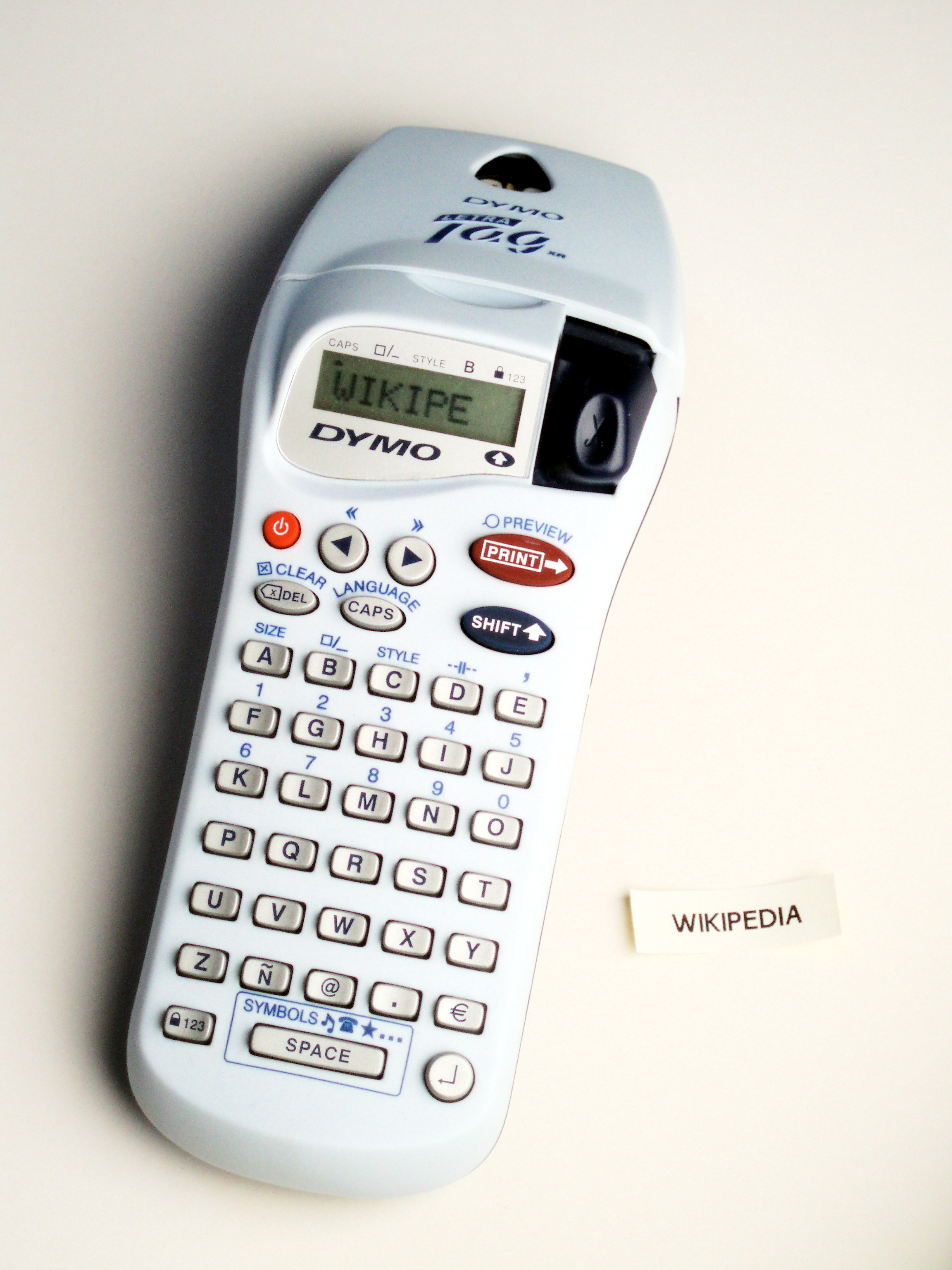
Dymo LetraTag, thermal-transfer printing label maker

5-digit label #	7-digit label #	General name	Width (inches)	Height (inches)	Labels per roll	Label appearance
30251		Address	3 1/2	1 1/8	130	White
30252		Address	3 1/2 (~8,9 cm)	1 1/8 (~2,8 cm)	350	White
30253		Address	3 1/2	1 1/8	700	White, (2 up)
30256		Shipping	4	2 5/16		White
30320		Address	3 1/2	1 1/8	130	White
30330		Return Address	2	3/4	500	White
30332			1	1		White
30333			1/2	1/2		White, (2 up)
30334			2 1/4	1 1/4		White
30335			1/2	1/2		White, (4 up)
30857	1760756	Name Badge	4	2 1/4	250	White

== Criticism ==
The LabelWriter 550 and 5XL has an RFID reader that reads RFID tags embedded in Dymo genuine label rolls to automatically detect the label type inside. However, this is also to prevent the use of third-party compatible label rolls, a form of digital rights management similar to inkjet printer cartridges and laser printer cartridges containing a chip to prevent the designing and manufacturing of third-party cartridges. Dymo has received criticism for using a razor and blades model by forcing customers to purchase genuine Dymo label rolls.

== See also ==
- Dymo DiscPainter
