= Smart tag =

Smart tag may refer to:

- SMART tag™, a student transportation system
- Smart Tag, a Virginia toll collection system
- SmartTAG, a Malaysian toll collection system
- Smart tag (Microsoft), a search feature in Microsoft software
- Smart label, a type of radio-frequency identification (RFID) transponder
- Smart Tag, a component of the Wheels of Zeus GPS-tracking system
- Samsung Galaxy SmartTag, a key finder
