= Label =

Material affixed to a container or article with printed information

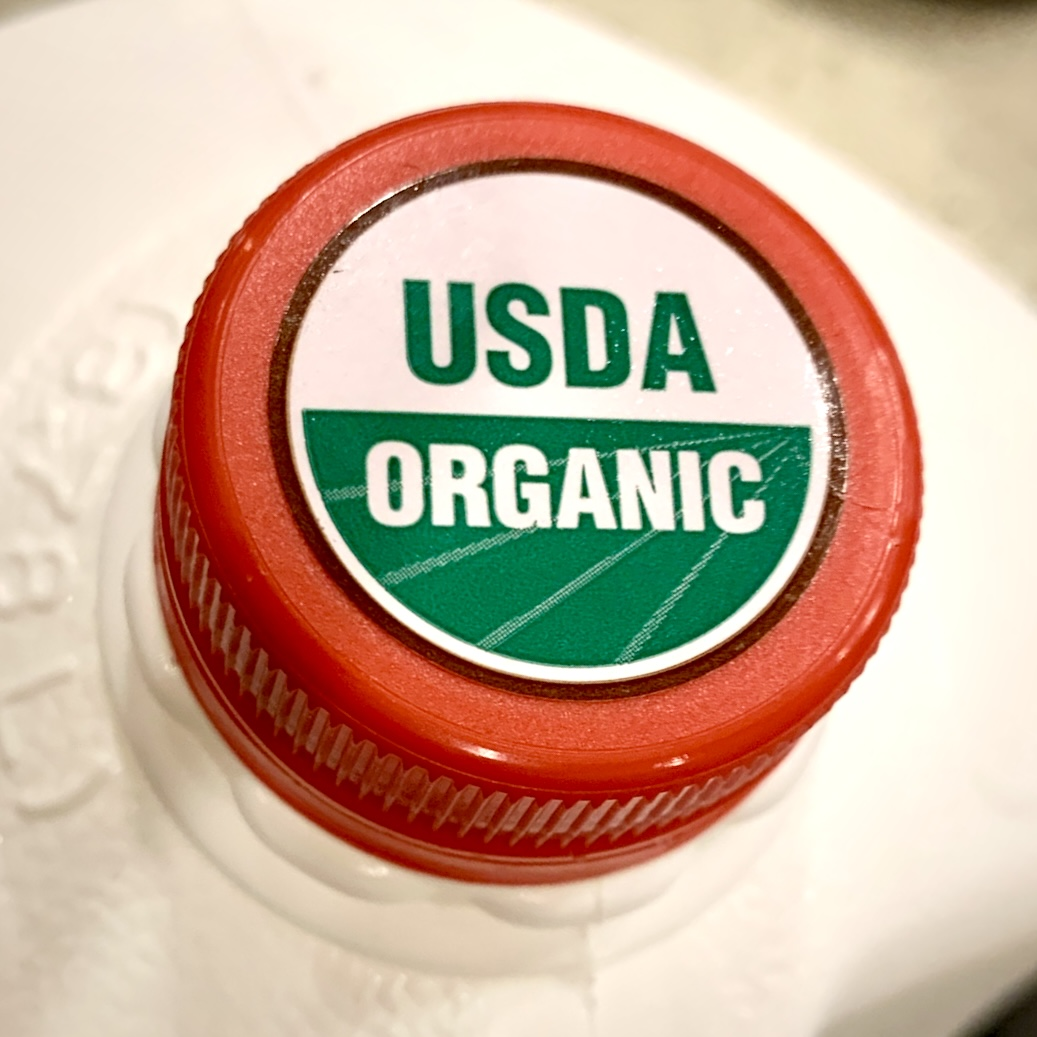
USDA Organic milk cap label

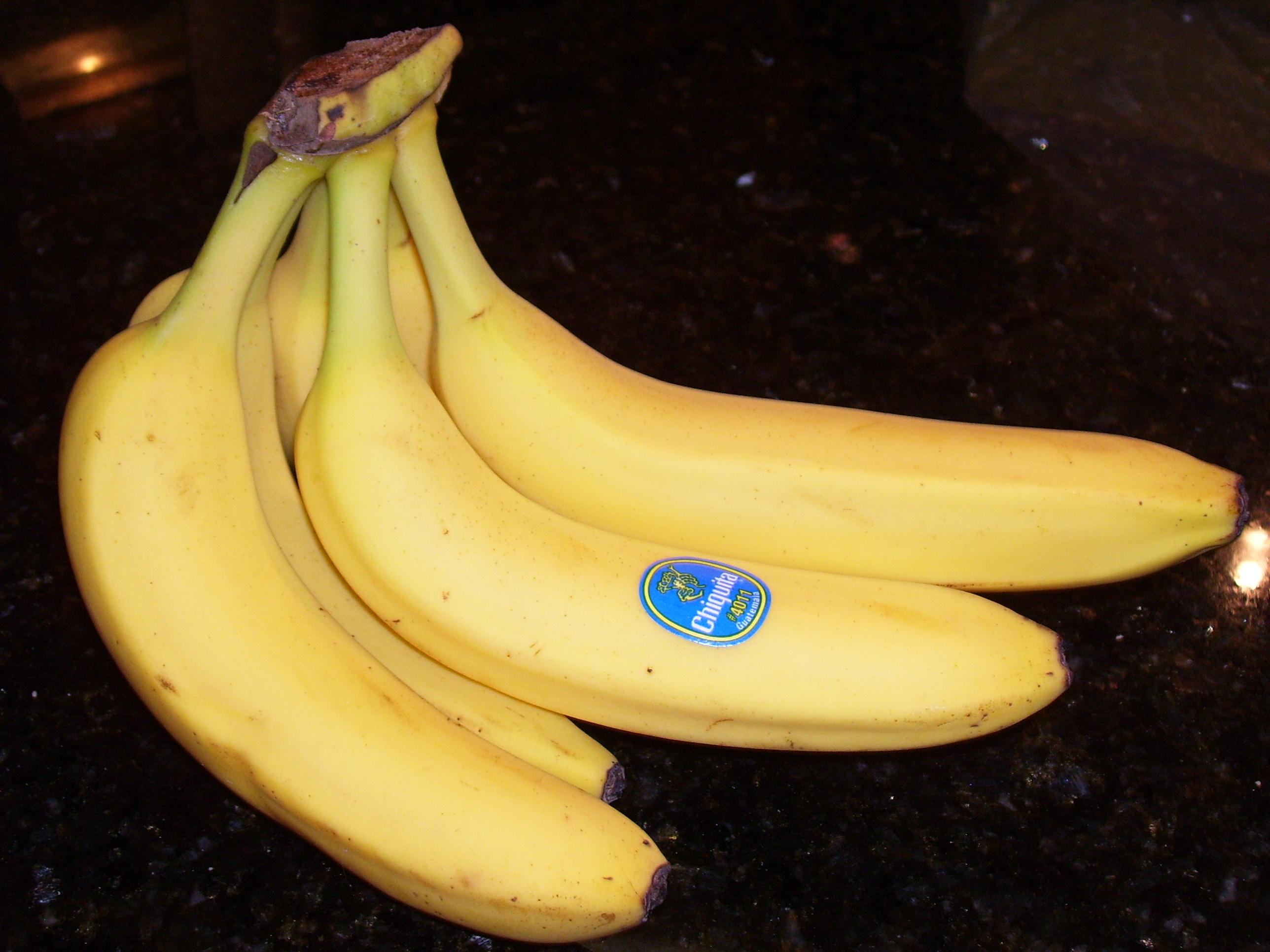
A bunch of bananas with a label

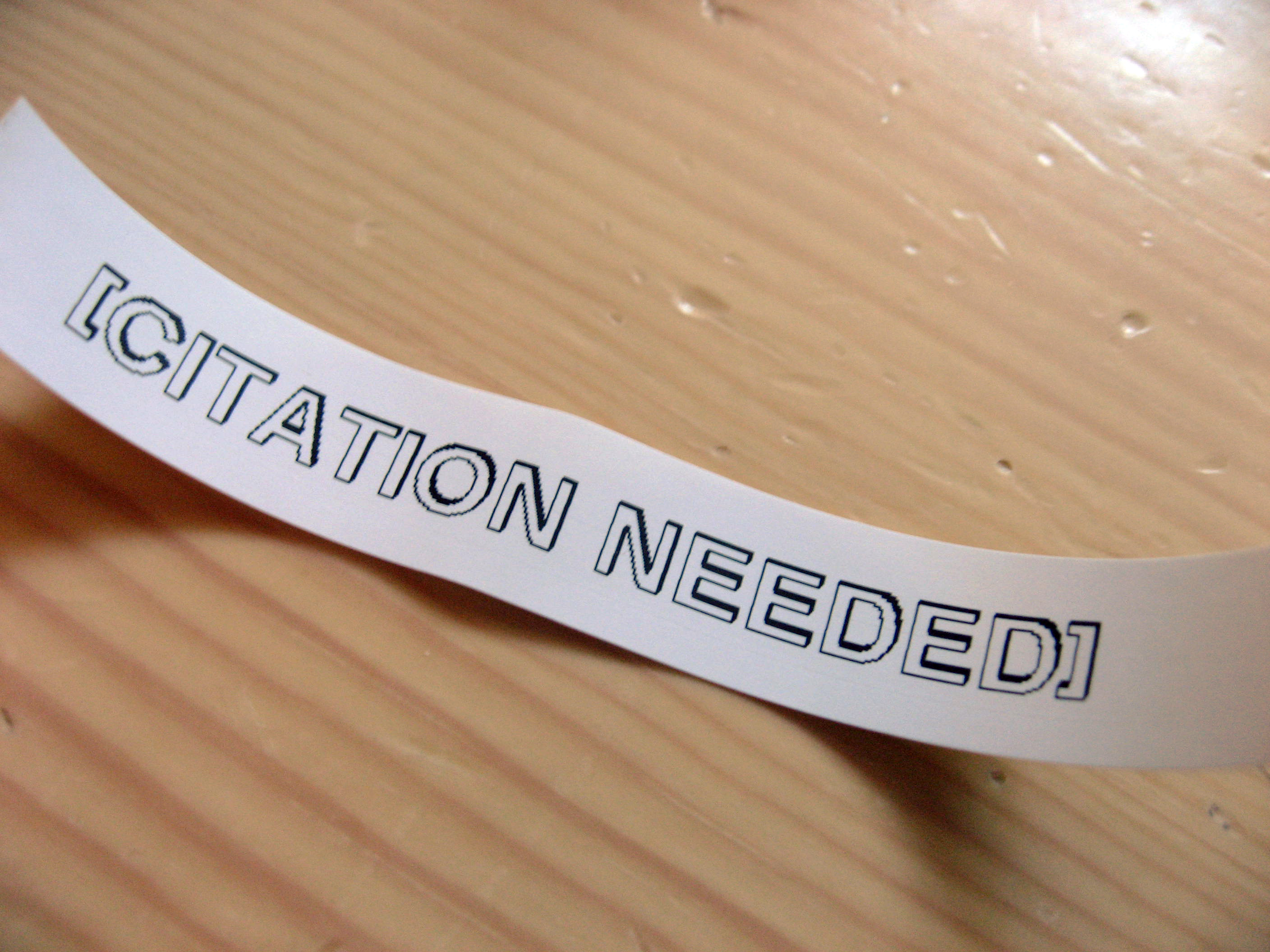
A label with faux embossing

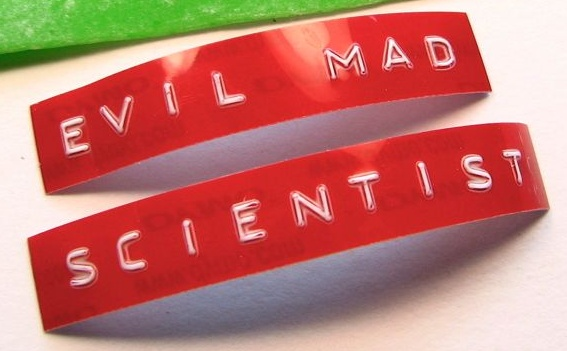
A label made with embossing tape

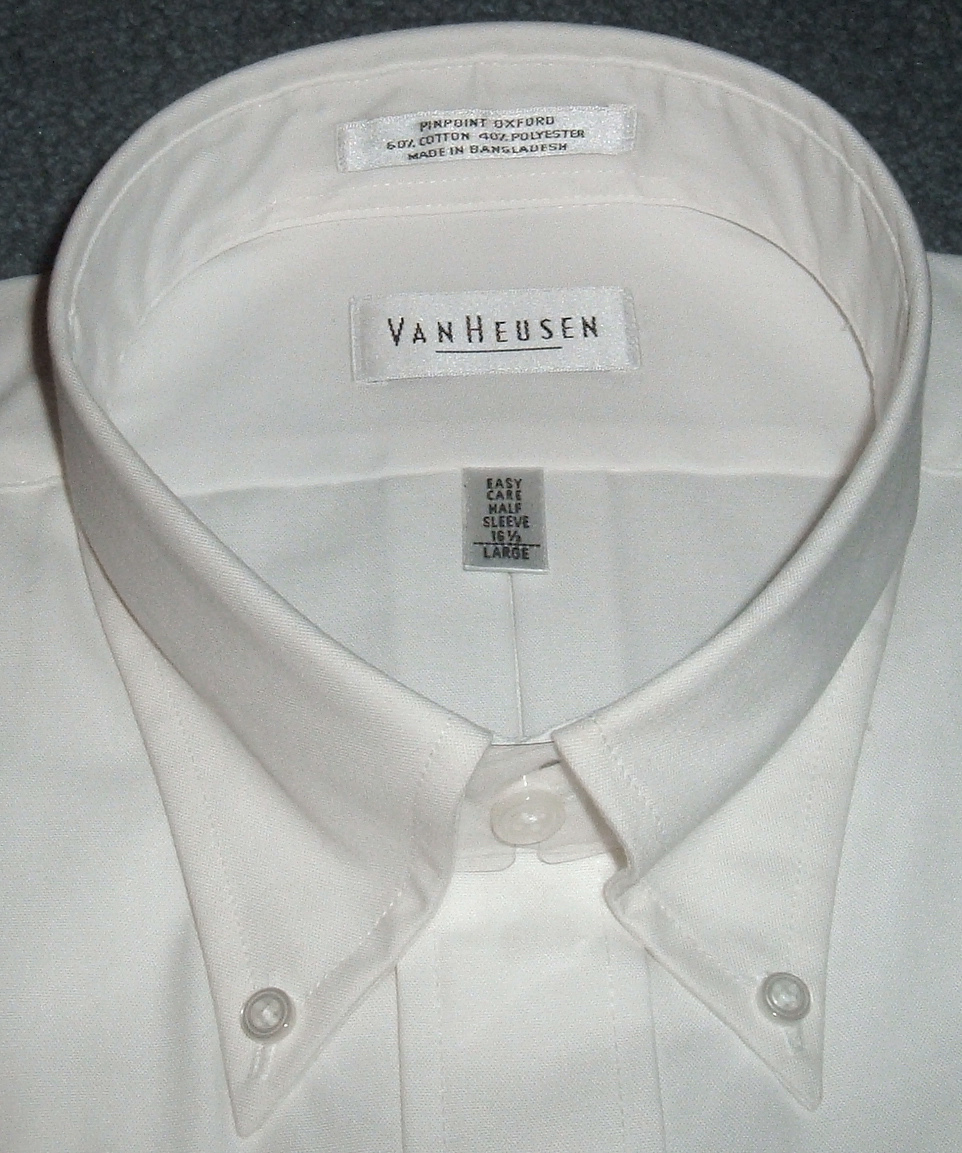
Shirt with labels

A label (as distinct from signage) is a piece of paper, plastic film, cloth, metal, or other material affixed to a container or product. Labels are most often affixed to packaging and containers using an adhesive, or sewing when affixed to clothing. Labels contain printed information or symbols about the product or item. Information printed directly on a container or article can also be considered labelling.

Labels have many uses, including promotion and providing information on a product's origin, the manufacturer (e.g., brand name), use, safety, shelf-life and disposal, some or all of which may be governed by legislation such as that for food in the UK or United States. Methods of production and attachment to packaging are many and various and may also be subject to internationally recognised standards. In many countries, hazardous products such as poisons or flammable liquids must have a warning label.

== Uses ==
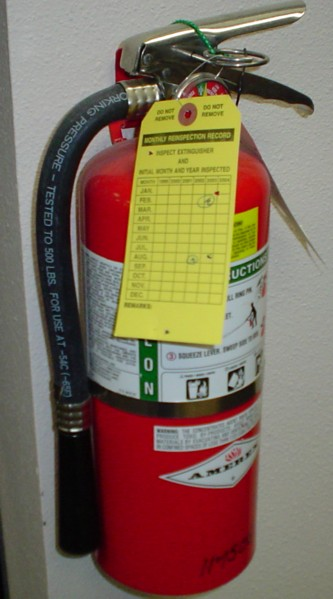
Fire extinguisher with permanent and temporary labels

Labels may be used for any combination of identification, information, warning, instructions for use, environmental advice or advertising. They may be stickers, permanent or temporary labels or printed packaging.

=== Products ===
Permanent product identification by a label is commonplace; labels need to remain secure throughout the life of the product. For example, a VIN plate on an automobile must be resistant to heat, oils and tampering; similarly, a food label must endure until the food has been used. Removable product labels need to bond until they are removed. For example, a label on a new refrigerator has installation, usage and environmental information: the label needs to be able to be removed cleanly and easily from the unit once installed.

Labels for food and beverages typically include critical information pertinent to the contents or ingredients used in a product, and may also state allergy risks such as the presence of gluten or soy. For example, the United States Food and Drug Administration (FDA) provides standards to regulate the information provided on the labels and packaging of wine and spirits. These labels include information like brand name, class and type designation, and alcohol content.

=== Packaging ===
Packaging may have labeling attached to or integral to the package. These may carry pricing, barcodes, UPC identification, usage guidance, addresses, advertising, recipes, and so on. They also may be used to help resist or indicate tampering or pilferage.

=== Assets ===
In industrial or military environments, asset labeling is used to clearly identify assets for maintenance and operational purposes. Such labels are frequently made of engraved Traffolyte or a similar material. They are usually tamper-evident, permanent or frangible and usually contain a barcode for electronic identification using readers. For example, the US Military uses a UID system for its assets.

=== Shelf / Rack labels ===
The storage locations in shelves are often marked with a shelf label (possibly also with a barcode or numbering). They can be self-adhesive, magnetic or slide-in.

=== Textiles ===
Garments normally carry separate care/treatment labels which, in some regions, are subject to legislation. Historically, these care and brand labels were predominantly woven or printed on basic textiles. However, the modern apparel industry has evolved to incorporate sustainable materials, such as recycled fibers and Polylactic acid (PLA), alongside advanced heat-transfer processes and RFID technologies for intelligent supply chain management. These labels typically indicate how the item should be washed (e.g., machine washed vs. dry cleaning), whether bleach can be used. Textile labels may be woven into the garment or attached, and can be heat resistant (so survivable in hot-air dryers and when pressed), colorfast (so does not bleed onto the garment), washable, leather or PVC/Plastic. Printed labels are an alternative to woven labels. Some upholstered furniture and mattresses have labels that are required by law, describing the contents of the stuffing.

Textiles containing pesticides as an ingredient may also require government approval and compulsory labeling. In the US, for example, labels have to state the pesticide registration number, statement of ingredients, storage and disposal information, and the following statement: "It is a violation of Federal Law to use this product in a manner inconsistent with its labeling”. A label including a company name or identification number and a material content list may also be required.

=== Mailing ===
Mailing labels identify the addressee, the sender and any other information which may be useful in transit. Many software packages such as word processor and contact manager programs produce standardized mailing labels from a data set that comply with postal standards. These labels may also include routing barcodes and special handling requirements to expedite delivery.

=== Specialized labels ===
- Notebook labels are mainly used for identifying the owner and purpose of the notebook. Some information on a label may include name, contents, and date started.
- Piggyback labels are made by combining two layers of adhesive substrate. The bottom layer forms the backing for the top. The label can be applied to any object as normal, the top layer can be a removable label that can be applied elsewhere, which may change the message or marking on the remaining label underneath. Often used on Express mail envelopes. Other applications include price change labels where when being scanned at the till, the till assistant can peel back the price-reduction label and scan the original barcode enabling stock flow management. These labels are also seen on magazine subscription renewals, allowing customers to re-subscribe to the magazine with an easy peel-and-stick label sent back. Also, as the retained label is adhesive free it prevents customers from re-applying the cheaper-priced labels to premium products.
- Smart labels have RFID chips embedded under the label stock.
- Blockout labels are not see-through at all, concealing what lies underneath with a strong gray adhesive.
- Radioactive labels. The use of radioactive isotopes of chemical elements, such as carbon-14, to allow the in vivo tracking of chemical compounds.
- Laser or printer labels are generally die cut on 8.5" x 11" (US letter) or A4 sized sheets, and come in many different shapes, sizes, formats and materials. Laser label material is a nonporous stock made to withstand the intense heat of laser printers and copiers. A drawback of laser labels is that the entire sheet needs to be printed before any labels are used; once labels have been removed the sheet cannot be put through the printer again without damaging the printing mechanism. Inkjet label material is a porous stock made to accept ink and dye from an inkjet printer. One of the more modern inkjet label material stocks is waterproof printable inkjet material commonly used for soap or shower gel containers.
- Security labels are used for anti-counterfeiting, brand protection, tamper-evident seals and anti-pilferage seals. These combine a number of overt and covert features to make reproduction difficult. The use of security printing, holography, embossing, barcodes, RFID chips, custom printing and weak (or weakened) backings are common. They are used for authentication, theft reduction, and protection against counterfeit and are commonly used on ID cards, credit cards, packaging, and products from CDs to electronics to clothing.
- Antimicrobial labels. With the growth in hospital-acquired infections such as MRSA and E-Coli, the use of antimicrobial labels in infection-sensitive areas of hospitals are helping in combating these types of microbes.
- Fold-out labels, also known as booklet, multi-page, multi-layer, or extended labels, or lablets (combined label + leaflet). Where the pack is not large enough for a single label to carry all the required information, fold-out labels are often preferred to separate leaflets, which can easily be lost. These labels are frequently seen on agricultural chemicals and consumer pharmaceuticals.
- Barcode labels A large proportion of labels produced today carry barcodes, either for product identification, for traceability in items such as freight packages, and on items requiring brand authentication and protection. There are many different formats of barcodes found on labels, but one of the most commonly distributed formats is the International Article Number (EAN). This is the code used to identify retail products worldwide and is found on almost all consumer-level packaging labels.
- Shrink Sleeve labels provide full 360-degree coverage on a container or bottle. Polyvinyl chloride (PVC) and Polyethylene Terephthalate Glycol-modified (PETG) are two commonly used shrink-sleeve materials. Shrink sleeves can be applied to uniquely shaped bottles or standard containers and can be printed with metallic features, textured/raised features, UV inks, and matt or glossy finishes.
- No-AI labels signify that a product was not made using generative AI.

== Stock types ==
Label "stock" is the carrier which is commonly coated on one side with adhesive and printed on the other, and can be:

- Paper - a variety of papers and paperboards can be used as labels
- Nonwoven fabric - for extra durability
- Latex – a lithographic stock with some added latex allows the label to be much more flexible and form around certain curved objects more easily than standard paper;

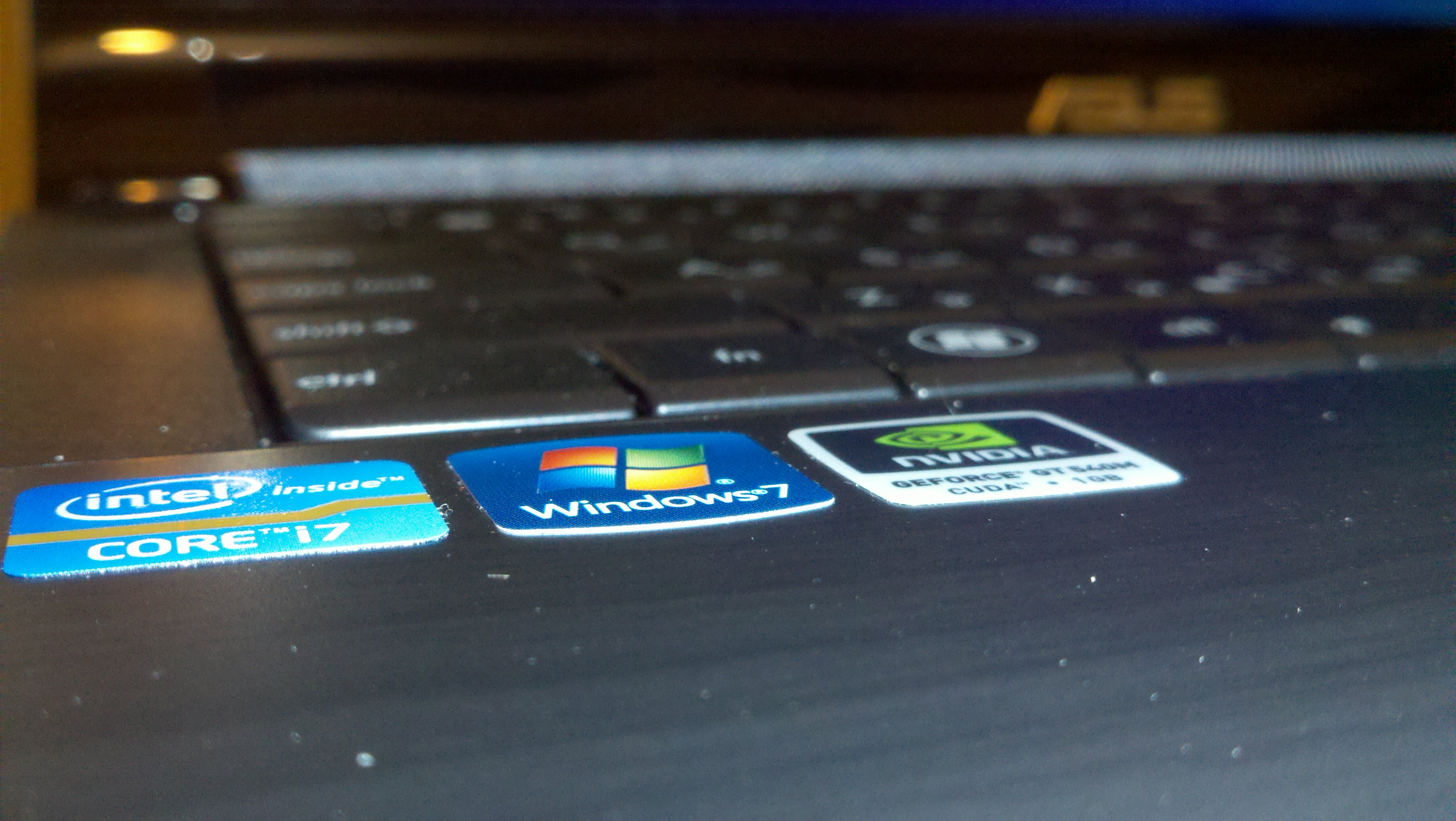
Labels on a laptop

- Plastics such as acetate, vinyl, and PET film allow a variety of features, such as greater strength, stiffness, transparency and resistance to tearing. They typically require special equipment and printing methods (ultra-violet curing is common) as they do not normally print well with conventional ink. A bumper sticker is usually a vinyl label with a very strong, durable adhesive and lightfast inks. Embossing tape is "printed" by pressing raised elements similar to printing type onto it, which produces raised glyphs that look white due to the discoloration of the plastic. A type known as 'destructible vinyl' is commonly used for asset labels. It combines a very thin frangible face stock with a very strong high tack adhesive, thus making the label impossible to remove without damaging it. Engraved multi-layer Traffolyte labels are frequently used in industrial situations due to their durability;
- Foil – Aluminum foil and vapor-coated plastic films are often chosen for the bright reflective characteristics;
- Thermal – direct thermal label stock will change color (usually black) when heated. A heating element in the shape of letters or images can be used to create an image on the label. Custom labels can be easily made on location in this way. A disadvantage is durability, because another heat source can ruin or obscure the image, or it may fade completely over time;
- Thermal transfer for applications that cannot use thermal (thermal direct) label material because of heat source proximity or short label life, a more widely used material is the thermal transfer label printer. This material has the advantage of a much longer readable life and does not fade with time or heat. Most major manufacturers of thermal printers can be used for either thermal transfer (TT) or thermal (DT) labels. A thermal transfer ribbon will be required to print the labels. The cost of the ribbons + TT labels is similar to that of the DT labels on their own;
- Thermal transfer ribbon types:
  - Wax is the most popular as it has some smudge resistance, and is suitable for matte and semi-gloss paper labels;
  - Wax and resin are smudge resistant, suitable for semi-gloss paper and some synthetic labels;
  - Resin is scratch and chemical-resistant, suitable for coated synthetic labels;
- None – labels can be printed directly on adhesive without using a substrate. Labels made in this manner are extremely fragile, however, and have been rendered virtually obsolete by other printing methods such as silk screen;

The stock type will affect the types of ink that will print well on them. Corona-treating or flame-treating some plastics makes them more receptive to inks, coatings, and other substrates by reducing surface tension and improving the overall adhesion of the plastics.

An alternative method of labelling is weaving the text directly into the fabric.

== Attachment ==
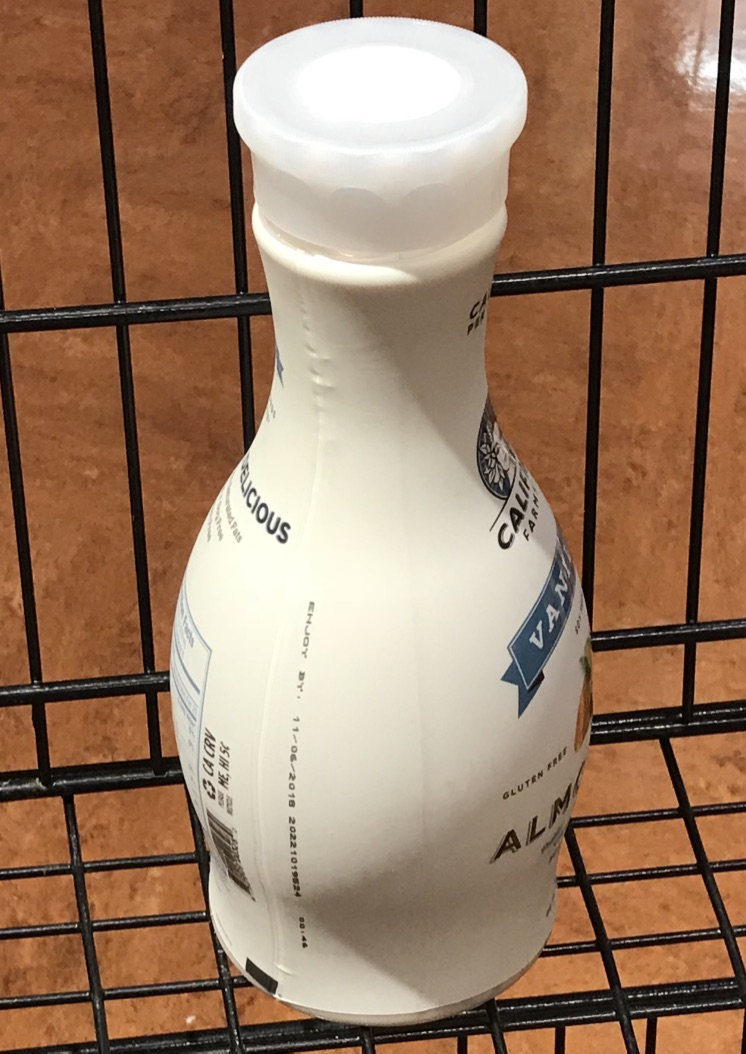
Shrink label over PET bottle of milk

Labels can be attached by:

- Heat-activated adhesives: for example, "in-mold labeling" can be part of blow molding containers and employs heat activated adhesives. Hot melt adhesives are also used.
- Pressure-sensitive adhesives (also called PSA or self-stick) are applied with light pressure without activation or heat. PSA labels often have release liners which protect the adhesive and assist label handling.
- Rivets used to attach information plates to industrial equipment.
- Shrink wrap for printed shrinkable labels placed over packages and then heated to shrink them.
- Sewing for fabrics such as clothing, tents, mattresses and industrial sacks.
- Wet glue such as starch, dextrin, PVA or water moistenable gummed adhesive.
- Yarn, twine or plastic tie, usually referred to as a swing tag.
- Static cling, where "stickers" have a static charge enabling them to attach without adhesive to smooth surfaces such as glass.

=== Pressure-sensitive adhesive types ===
Pressure-sensitive adhesives for labels are commonly acrylic based adhesives, with a smaller volume made using solvent-coated rubber adhesives and hot-melt coated adhesives. The most common adhesive types are:

- Permanent – Typically not designed to be removed without tearing the stock, damaging the surface, or using solvents. The adhesion strength and speed can also be varied. For example, full adhesion can be nearly instant, or the label can be almost removable for a short period with full adhesion developing in minutes or hours (known as repositionable adhesives).
- Peelable – Adhesion is fairly strong and will not fall off in normal circumstances, but the label can be removed relatively easily without tearing the base stock or leaving adhesive behind on the old surface. The adhesive is usually strong enough to be applied again elsewhere. This type is frequently known as 'removable'. There are many different types of removable adhesives, some are almost permanent, and some are almost 'ultra peelable'.
- Ultra-peelable – Designed principally for use on book covers and glass, when removed these adhesive labels do not leave any residue whatsoever. Adhesion is weak and only suitable for light-duty applications. Normally these labels have very little adhesion to anything once they've been removed.
- Freezer or frost fix – Most permanent and peelable adhesives have a service temperature limit of -10 degrees Celsius, whereas freezer (otherwise known as frost fix) adhesives have a service temperature of -40 degrees Celsius and are suitable for deep freeze use.
- High tack – A type of permanent adhesive that exhibits a high initial grab to the application surfaces, and is commonly used at higher coat weights to enable labels to adhere strongly to difficult, rough or dirty surfaces.

=== Application ===
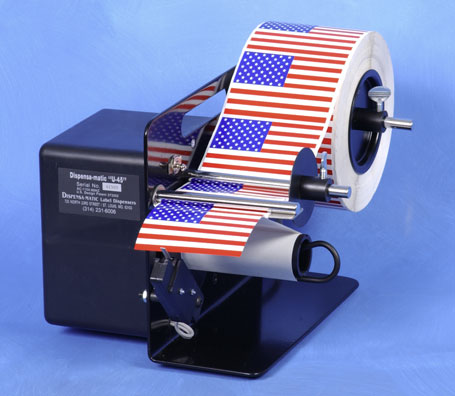
A typical label dispenser, used here to dispense U.S. flag adhesive labels

Labels may be supplied separately or on a roll or sheet. Many labels are pre-printed by the manufacturer. Others have printing applied manually or automatically at the time of application. Specialized high-speed label printer applicators may be used to apply labels to packages; these and other methods may be subject to recognized standards. Some labels have protective overcoats, laminates, or tape to cover them after the final print is applied. This is sometimes before application and sometimes after. Labels are often difficult to peel and apply. A label dispenser can speed up this task.

== Usability ==
Aspects such as legibility, literacy and interpretation come into play for users of labels, and label writers therefore need some degree of professional writing skill. Depending upon country or region, international standards may be applied. Where literacy may be an issue, pictograms may feature alongside text, such as those advanced by CropLife International in their Responsible Use manual. Labels or printed packaging may include Braille to aid users with visual impairment.

Criticism of label readability is not uncommon; for example, Canadian researchers found that medicine labels did not consistently follow legibility guidelines. In some countries and industries, for example the UK (food) and EU (medicines) label guidelines are not legally binding (the latter using phrases such as "The type size should be as large as possible to aid readers...") and thus are unenforceable. On the other hand, countries may stipulate legal minima for readability, such as the USA's FDA on nutritional information and Australia/New Zealand's code for food labels and packs.

== Environmental considerations ==
=== Compliance ===
Labels of sustainability standards and certification such as organic food and energy efficiency class labels are often intended to confirm compliance with relevant social and environmental considerations, enabling consumers and other purchasers to make more ethical decisions in terms of the environmental impact of products.

Labels such as the European Eco-label and those issued by sustainability standards organisations may be used by businesses and public bodies to confirm compliance. Public procurement regulations in the European Union and the United Kingdom require that label requirements only include those which are "linked to the subject-matter of the contract".

In June 2023, the Scientific Advice Mechanism to the European Commission concluded that the effectiveness of food labelling related to health impacts was "low to moderate" according to available evidence, and that "shaping the information environment through labelling is necessary but not sufficient to advance healthy and sustainable diets".

The approach of labels can involve a trade-off between financial considerations and higher cost requirements in effort or time for the product-selection from the many available options.

=== Impact of labels on the environment ===
Labels may affect the environment during manufacture, use, and post-use. Choice of backings, coatings, adhesives and liners can be strong factors. Environmental regulations and guidelines can come from many sources. Users of labels on packaging may consider some of the sustainable packaging guidelines. Based on the solid waste hierarchy, the quantity and size of labels should be minimized without reducing the necessary functionality. The material content of a label should comply with applicable regulations. Life cycle assessments of the item being labeled and of the label itself are useful to identify and improve possible environmental effects. For example, reuse or recycling are sometimes aided by a label being removable from a surface.

If a label remains on an item during recycling, a label should be chosen which does not hinder the recyclability of the item. For example, when labeled corrugated boxes are recycled, wet strength paper labels do not hinder box recycling: the PSA adhesive stays with the backing and is easily removed. Paper backings without wet strength may release their adhesives, potentially contaminating recycling efforts. Labels can aid in recycling and reuse by communicating the material content of the item, instructions for disassembly or recycling directions. An eco-label is used on consumer products (including foods) to identify products that may be less damaging to the environment and/or humans than other related products, such as sustainable seafood encouraged by Friend of the Sea.

== Other aspects ==
=== Colour ===
Ink and base stock colour choices commonly conform to the Pantone Matching System (PMS) colours. The Pantone system is very dominant in the label printing industry. Additionally, specialty inks such as metallic, UV ink, magnetic ink, and more are available. Ink is usually transparent however it can be made opaque. It has been known for certain companies to patent "their own" colour. Digital labels use process colours to replicate Pantone solid colours.

=== Collectability ===
Collecting labels is a worldwide phenomenon, from labels used on matchboxes and foodstuffs (e.g., cheese), wine, to printed packages. Collectors are attracted to labels both for their influence on artistic design and the history of retailing.

== See also ==
- Halal conspiracy theories
- Head badge
- Labelling
- Nameplate
- Packaging and labeling
- Pressure-sensitive tape
- Sticker
- Swing tag
