= Trotec =

Trotec Laser.
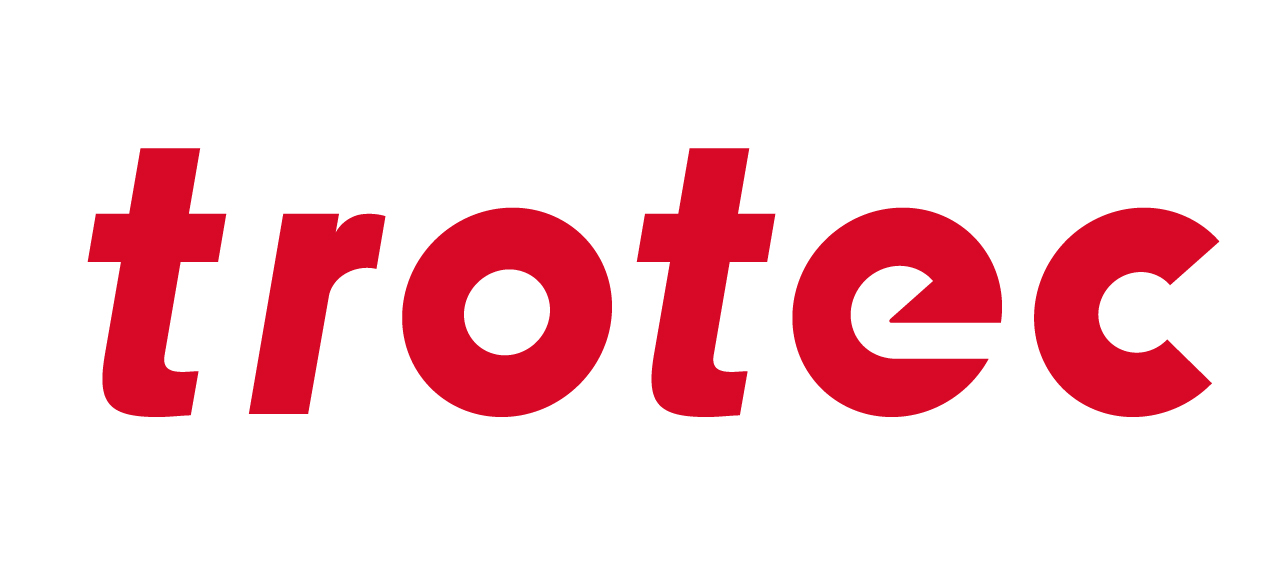
- Type: Private limited company
- Industry: Manufacturing
- Founded: (1997) Wels, Austria
- Headquarters: Freilinger Str. 99, 4614, Marchtrenk, Austria
- Area served: Worldwide
- Products: laser systems for laser engraving, laser marking, and laser cutting
- Number of employees: +750
- Website: troteclaser.com

Trotec Laser is an international manufacturer of advanced laser technology for laser cutting, laser engraving and laser marking. The company was founded in 1997, branching off from a research and development department within its parent company Trodat.

Trotec is headquartered in Marchtrenk, Austria, with subsidiaries around the world in the United Kingdom, the United States, Canada, Germany, France, Netherlands, Poland, China, Japan, Russia, Australia and South Africa. The company also has an extensive network of distributors around the world serving more than 90 countries.

== Laser systems ==
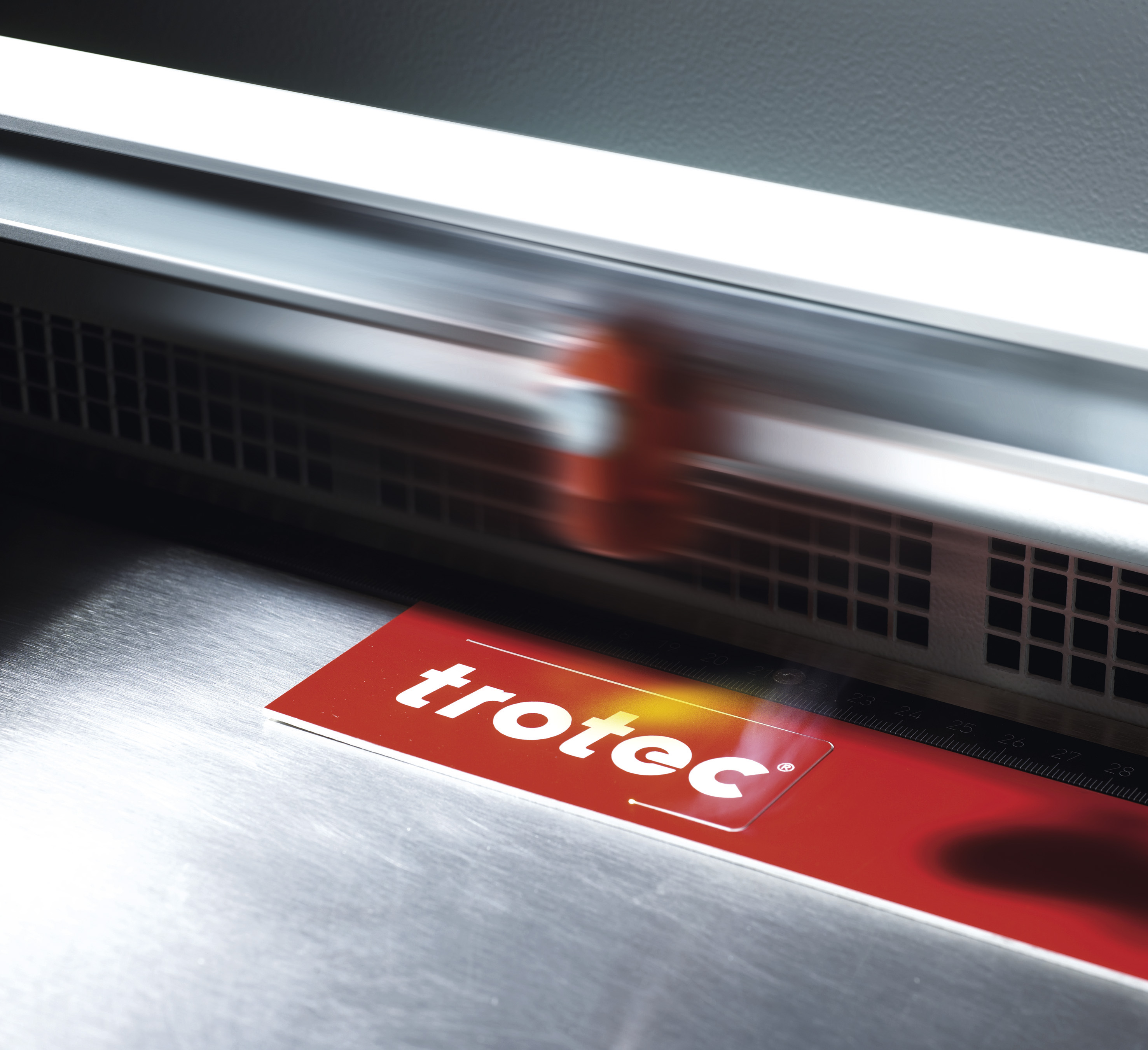
Trotec laser system

Trotec manufactures both flatbed and galvo laser systems, as well as bespoke solutions for specialist clients. Its CO_{2} lasers range from 12 to 500 watts and its fiber laser systems range from 10 to 50 watts.

In 2008 Trotec introduced the Rayjet, a desktop laser system aimed specifically at small and medium enterprises.

In 2026 Trotec launched a new product line named BlackLine, this is the newest generation of machines developed by Trotec. The first product in this line was the Speedy 480 Speedy BlackLine the next product in this line was the Speedy 360.

Additional products launched in 2026 were:

- SpeedMarker 330 - A new galvo system in the portfolio
- E340 - Under the "Essential" product line, an entry level laser

== Laserable materials and Engraving Supplies ==
Trotec also supplies a wide range of laserable sheet materials and engravable gifts. The range includes coloured and special effect acrylics, plastic laminates called TroLase which are a modern and laserable alternative to Traffolyte, wood varieties, metals and more. In addition to the engraving materials, Trotec also supplies a range of marking solutions and pastes which can be used for laser marking metals with a CO_{2} laser source. In many countries, Trotec also still offers sheet materials which are suitable for mechanical engraving applications.

The materials can be purchased at Trotec's webshop.
