= Label dispenser =

Machine dispensing stick-on labels

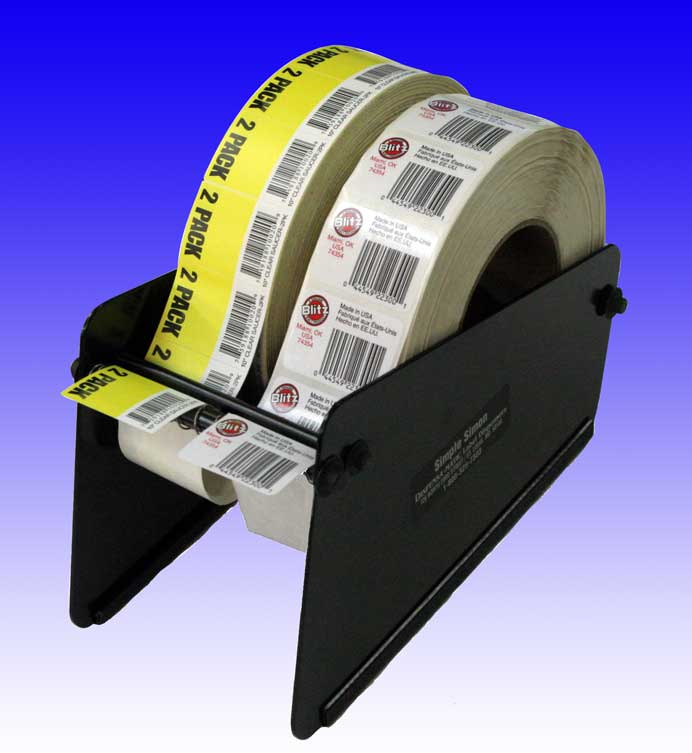

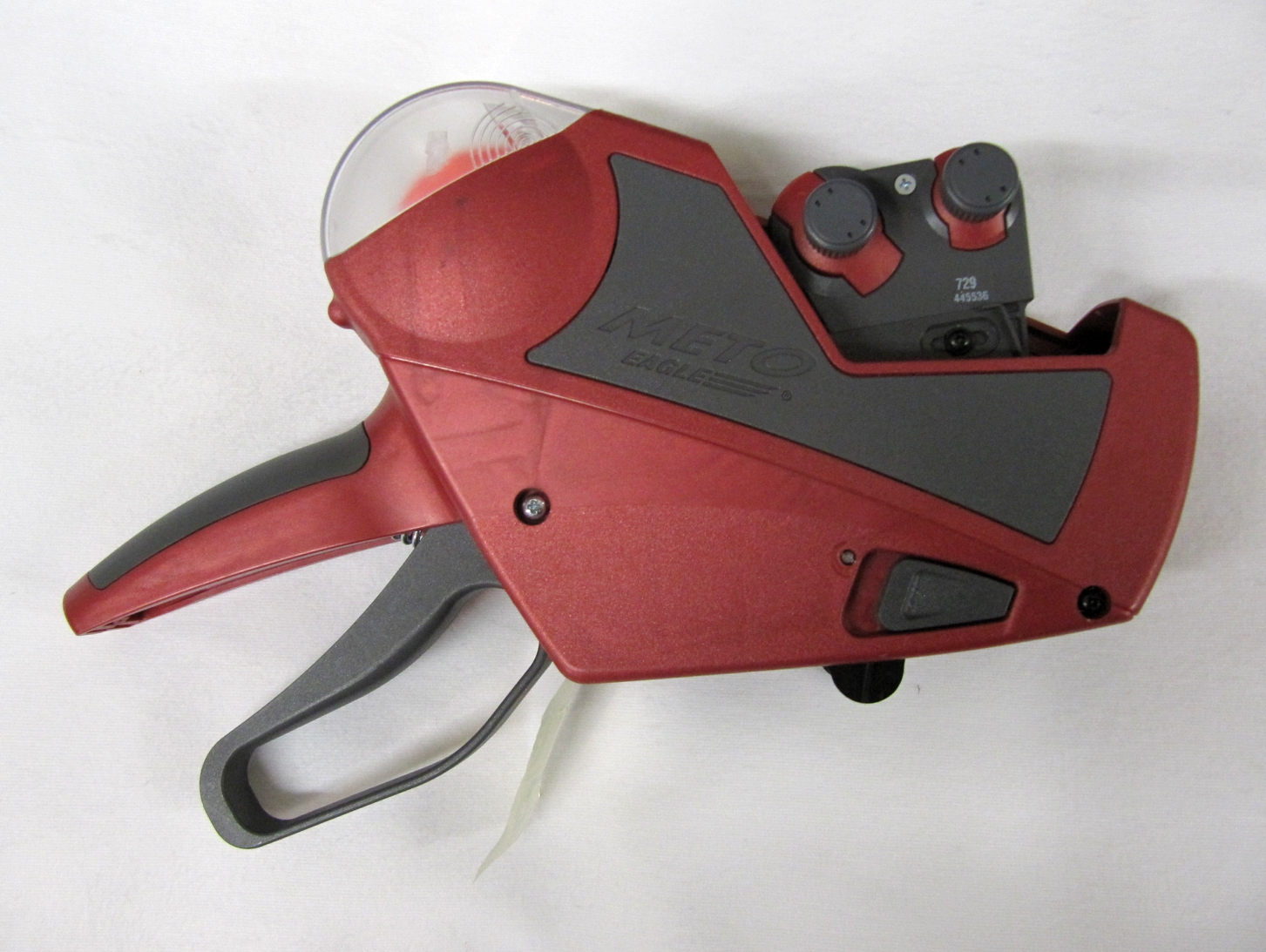
Handheld applicator for price stickers

Label dispensers and label applicators are machines built to simplify the process of removing a label from its liner or backing tape. Some are bench-top for dispensing the labels while others include the application of the label to the item (such as a package). Unlike label printer applicators, they dispense preprinted labels.

Label dispensers are generally intended to dispense a label to an operator who manually applies the label to the package. They are designed with varying sizes and features which are often specific to the type of label they can dispense and to the degree of automation desired.

Label applicators are usually part of a larger packaging line. They receive the package from a previous automation stage, apply the label, and feed the package to the next stage in the packaging line.

== Use ==
Many everyday items have stick-on labels, which were either applied by a machine or by hand, and most likely were peeled from the backing paper using some sort of label dispenser. Some of the more common applications are bulk mailing, manufacturing, packaging, food and beverage, fast food, and photo labs.

== Manual label dispenser ==
Patents on manual label dispensers go back to the 1920s. They are designed for light-duty use. They are operated by hand and are not automated, but still assist in the process of removing labels from their liners. Many manual label dispensers can dispense multiple rolls at once. Operation is performed by pulling the liner/backing paper around a plate or bar which causes the label to peel away from the backing paper. This happens because the backing paper is usually thinner than the label itself and is also underneath. When the liner is forced around a tight radius the label lifts away and protrudes through the front or top of the dispenser.

== Semi-automatic label dispenser ==
Electric semi-automatic label dispensers were first patented in the early 1970s. They were originally designed for multiple-row address labels for bulk mailing houses. On average a good mailing house employee could apply approximately 500 labels per hour to envelopes. The label dispenser increased this to over 2,000 per hour. These dispensers advance individual or multiple-row labels and remove them from their lining similar to a manual dispenser, but instead of manually pulling on the liner, label advancement occurs when a trigger on the dispenser detects the absence of a label, such as when the operator removes the label. The sensor then closes the circuit and engages the motor, dispensing the next label until the sensor once again detects the label which opens the circuit. The first electric dispenser was designed with the limit switch on the left of a 16" wide machine. 4-up multiple-row labels were loaded into the machine and once activated would advance one row of labels. The operator would take the labels from right to left, so that when the leftmost label was taken, the next row advanced, automatically providing a constant supply of labels to apply. The labels are also peeled without the natural curl that will happen when pulled from the backing paper with fingers. Also, only one hand was needed to take the label, the other hand could be used to move the material the label was being applied to.

== Label applicators ==
Label applicators are fully automated and can range from simple slower speed models to large machines capable of applying hundreds or even thousands of labels per minute.

Applicators advance the label stock over the peeler plate until a portion of the label, called the "flag," is extended into the path of the oncoming package. When the package engages the label flag, the label web is advanced to match the speed of the package and label is either tamped or wiped on to assure adhesion. Proper alignment of the label on the package depends on sensors that sense the location/orientation of the package and label sensors that detect the location of the label edge. Package sensors can be a variety of Position sensors, often optical sensors or Ultrasonic sensors. Label sensors are usually Photoelectric sensors because they are inexpensive. But clear labels cannot be detected by photoelectric sensors. Capacitive and ultrasonic technologies are used for clear label detection.

=== Components ===
- Motor: The motor automates the label dispenser and controls the speed at which labels are dispensed.
- Feed-Roller: This actually is the first patented method used in the semi-automatic label dispenser to advance the label forward. The label material is fed over the peeling edge, then through a feed-roller assembly which pinches the label material between a metal roller and a rubber roller. The metal roller is held in place with bushings pressed into aluminum blocks which hinge on a rod supported between two sideframes. The blocks use springs on each side to hold tension against the rubber roller (driven by a motor), and this also holds the tracking of the label material to the side of the machine with the sensor. Using this method label stock up to 16" width can be advanced and tracked perfectly. The disadvantage/advantage to this method is waste is not collected, but pushed out through the rear of the machine where it can be fed into a trash receptacle.
- Take-up hub/spool: This can take the place of the feed-roller. The take-up hub consists of a bar and a liner holder/clip, which are connected to the motor on a single side-frame. In operation, they turn in sync with the motor and wind the label liner in order to collect it in one place. As the take-up hub turns, pressure is placed in the liner and it is stretched across the strip plate, where peeling, or separation, occurs.
- Peeler plate: A component of the machine which acts as a separator for the label and its liner. Each label is pulled across the strip plate until it is recognized by a photo sensor or limit switch. Strip plates can be of varying design and material, but they are often made of plastic, metal coil, or aluminum.
- Photodetector or Limit switch: Used to trigger label advancement. Every semi-automatic label dispenser is equipped with one or the other. These detect the absence or presence of a label to facilitate dispensing.
- Limit switch: This is the original method of label detection and can be used for most applications, it can detect a wide variety of labels.
- Photodetector/Electric eye: Is an alternate method which uses a beam of light broken by the label as it passes over/between the sensors. It can be used for many different label types, but transparent material is an issue.
