= Dymo DiscPainter =

CD and DVD printer

Dymo logo

A Dymo DiscPainter in action

Dymo DiscPainter is a CD and DVD printer that prints a user's image or text of choice directly onto the optical disc, eliminating the need for a label.

The device prints directly onto spinning CDs or DVDs in 60 seconds for a 600 dpi image. For a 1200 dpi image the print time is reportedly about three minutes. Edge-to-center hub printing provides full coverage on the disc. Discus for Dymo software included ready-made canvases and a photo collage tool.

DiscPainter is manufactured by Dymo, a company that specializes in label-making devices.

According to The New York Times, the printer is small, silent and easy to use. They note however that the DiscPainter only works with inkjet-printable discs, which are a few dollars more expensive than regular discs.

The inkjet printer is useful to individuals in creative industries like designers, photographers, and artists who need to produce visually compelling discs. It also provides a smaller carbon footprint by consumers creating personalized CD covers at a time when downloading music was a new technology, which was hurting the thriving music industry, also allowing independent artists a cost-effective option to distribute their music.
