= Trodat =

Trodat Inc.
- Company type: Private limited company
- Industry: Metal industry
- Founded: (1912) Vienna, Austria
- Founder: Franz Just
- Headquarters: Wels, Upper Austria, Austria
- Area served: Worldwide
- Products: self-inking rubber stamps, marking products, laser engraving machines
- Number of employees: 1,000 worldwide (2017)

Trodat, Inc. is an Austrian multinational company which claims to be the world's largest manufacturer of rubber stamps (base sales). Trodat has its company headquarters in Wels, Austria, and employs more than 1,000 people worldwide.

== History ==
Trodat Trotec Group was founded in Vienna, Austria, in 1912, with the founding of the sole proprietorship of Franz Just & Söhne.

In 1951, the company relocated to the American occupation zone in Upper Austria, subsequently completing the first exports to Switzerland, Denmark, the Netherlands and Germany.

The company's current name is derived from a product designation. During 1947 and 1948, the first plastic date stamp with the Trodat name was produced. Trodat is a portmanteau of "TRO", standing for Trolitul, a plastic previously used for stamp manufacture, and "DAT", for date stamp. After rebranding in the late 1960s, Trodat became the official company name.

== Structure ==
Trodat Trotec Holding GmbH was founded in 1987 as the parent company for foreign subsidiaries. The present-day corporate structure with management holding and operating corporations was adopted in 1999. As of 2017, the Trodat Trotec international group employs more than 1,550 people across more than 40 foreign and domestic subsidiaries, with staff in Austria, Germany, Switzerland, the Netherlands, France, Great Britain, Poland, Canada, the United States, South Africa, China, Japan, India, Russian Federation, Belgium, Italy, Brazil, Mexico, Australia and Spain. The total turnover for the group of companies for the last fiscal year was around EUR 249 million. The group’s CEO is Norbert Schrüfer and the CFO is Peter Köstler.

The following companies belong to Trodat Trotec Holding GmbH:

- Trodat GmbH, Wels, Austria
- Trotec Laser GmbH, Wels / Marchtrenk Austria
- Trodat Produktions GmbH, Wels, Austria

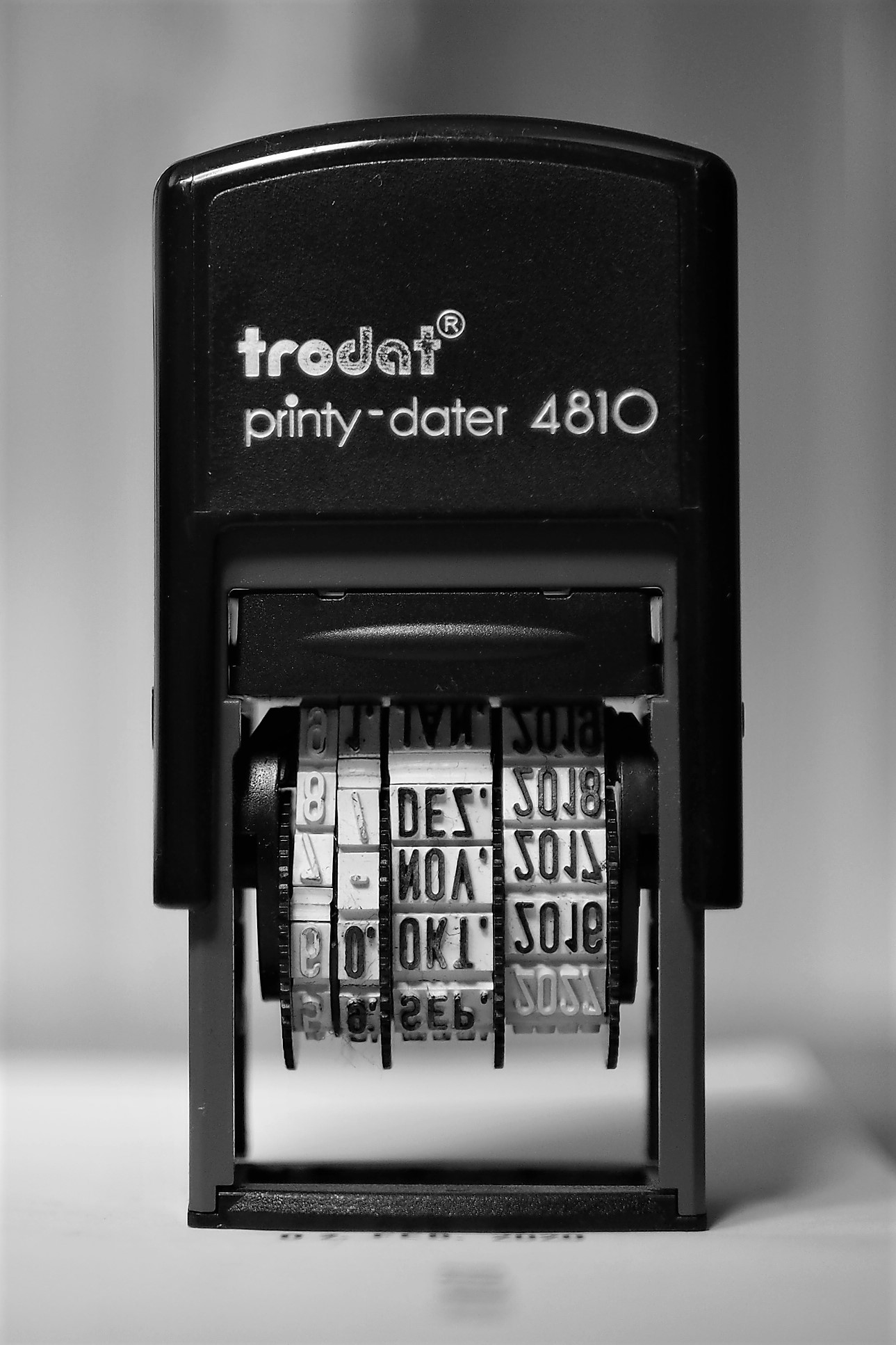
Self-inking date stamp trodat printy-dater 4810

== Products ==
The Trodat Group's products and services are focused on the stamp and laser business, with the stamp components marketed as Trodat, and laser systems and services under the subsidiary brand Trotec.

According to its own data, Trodat is the largest manufacturer of stamps in the world, in terms of base sales. It specialises in self-inking stamps with a built-in stamp pad. The Trodat Printy stamp, which was introduced to the market in 1976, has sold over 300 million, according to the manufacturer's data.

Trotec, founded in 1997, provides laser systems, and offers engraving, marking, and cutting services.

A software product named uTypia for ordering personalised stamps was developed to sell Trodat stamps online. The online ordering system has existed since 2000. According to Trodat, the company's products are sold online in more than 500 uTypia online shops.

== Trodat Company Museum - Villa Muthesius ==
The Trodat Company Museum is housed by the Villa at No. 4 Pollheimerstraße. It was originally built for the leather manufacturer Ploberger located near the mill creek in Wels, opposite the Ledererturm, between 1916 and 1918. Trodat purchased it in 1997 and renovated it. The building was designed by Hermann Muthesius (1861-1927), who was also the founder of the Deutscher Werkbund (German Association of Craftsmen). The former Samitz Villa (at the time, the office of an ENT doctor) is known today as Villa Muthesius and operated by lebensspuren - Der Verein für Kunst & Kultur. The association, which was founded in 2016, uses the two halls of the Villa as event spaces.
