= SureThing =

SureThing logo

SureThing is a line of label printing software created by MicroVision Development.

Its most popular program is SureThing CD Labeler, which is designed to produce CD and DVD labels as well as LightScribe writing. SureThing CD Labeler's allows clipart and images to the labels to improve the label's design. The program supports playlists as well. SureThing has pre-produced templates for labels for LightScribe, 45-inch vinyl, CD, DVD, pocket CDs. It allows customers to create song labels electronically from the playlist of a CD player or other device.

In 1999, Electronic Musician's David Rubin wrote that the "SureThing label applicator is arguably the weakest part of the package. Designed around a CD jewel case, it's awkward to use and susceptible to damage" and that "[c]learly, the SureThing software is the main reason that someone would buy this kit". Katherine Stevenson wrote in a 2002 review of SureThing that the "handy preview and browse capabilities make the vast number of options manageable" and that "Depending how flat the label lies, and how evenly you apply pressure with your fingers, you may still end up with wrinkles". In 2002, the SureThing CD Labeler received awards from SharewareJunkies for "Best Program of the Year", as well as the "Best Windows Program".

In a 2005 review, "SureThing is a bit better, but lacks niceties like the alignment tools we've all grown accustomed to from the menu design functions in DVD-authoring programs." Sally Wiener Grotta and Daniel Grotta wrote in a 2009 PC World that "SureThing CD Labeler is an intuitive, easy-to-learn program" and "SureThing can make the difference between having your CDs and DVDs look homemade or professional".
