= Crossfire (band) =

- Origin: Sydney, New South Wales, Australia
- Genre: Jazz-fusion
- Years active: 1974–1983, 1991
- Labels: Trafalgar/RCA, Warner, East West
- Past members: Jim Kelly; Michael Kenny; Ian Bloxsom; Greg Lyon; Phil Scorgie; Don Reid; Tony Buchanan; John Proud; Doug Gallacher; Steve Hopes; Mark Riley

Crossfire was an Australian jazz-fusion band active from 1974 to 1991, which recorded five studio albums. The primary composers of the group were founding members Jim Kelly (guitars) and Michael Kenny (keyboards, piano). Other members of Crossfire included Ian Bloxsom (percussion, glockenspiel), Greg Lyon and Phil Scorgie (electric bass), Don Reid and Tony Buchanan (saxophones, flute), John Proud, Doug Gallacher, Steve Hopes and Mark Riley (drums).

== History ==
Crossfire was a jazz-fusion band formed in Sydney in 1974 with a line-up of Ian Bloxsom on percussion, Tony Buchanan on saxophone, Steve Hopes on drums, Jim Kelly on guitar, Michael Kenny on piano and Greg Lyon on bass guitar. Bloxsom, Kelly and Kenny had been band mates in Southern Contemporary Rock Assembly. The ensemble issued a self-titled debut album late in 1975, with a line-up of Bloxsom; Kelly; Kenny on keyboards and trumpet; Lyon on bass guitar and vocals; John Proud on drums and Don Reid on reeds. Rock Australia Magazine's Felicity Surtees found that the group had "gone past the stage of being just a creative outlet and has become a major part of their lives." Lyon described their style, "what we play is contemporary music. We're influenced by everyone really... It allows everyone to be creative."

Crossfire were the first Australian artists to use direct-to-disc recording for their aptly titled second album, ''Direct to Disc, in late 1978. It was produced and engineered by Alan Thorne and issued by Trafalgar Records/RCA. For the album, the line-up was Bloxsom; Kenny on Wurlitzer piano and flugelhorn; Lyon; Kelly on guitar; and Don Reid on saxophones and flute; joined by Doug Gallacher on drums. Michael Foster of the Canberra Times felt "their music displays many moods — playful and joyous, eerie and sombre — always sensitive, reflecting the influences and experiences of each player." He emphasised "the effect gained by the horns, which seem to hang suspended a lot of the time against a backdrop of the instruments which normally carry rhythm, and the percussion group. The rhythm and percussion instruments often, as is the way since bop, step outside their roles as custodians of time and measure, and establish their own rights to individual actions."

The group's third album, East of Where (1980), was issued on WEA and was co-produced by Kelly, Kenny and Martin Benge. All the tracks were written by Kelly or Kenny. For this album Bloxsom, Buchanan, Hopes, Kelly and Kenny were joined by Phil Scorgie bass guitar. Foster found there was "more humour in this album than in the previous one. The music is of the same genre, but there is a certain wryness in the approach to its work, by one of Australia's most exciting bands." Although "there are times when it gets a little heavy, but generally the music lifts and soars, and is fun to listen to."

Crossfire were the backing band for the American jazz singer Michael Franks on an Australian tour, which provided a live album, Michael Franks with Crossfire Live (1980). They were also the backing band for American jazz guitarist Lee Ritenour during his 1981 Australian tour. Lee was impressed when Michael Franks had played Lee his tapes of his live album back in L.A. In late 1982 they issued their fourth studio album, Hysterical Rochords, again with Kelly, Kenny and Benge co-producing. The line-up was Bloxsom, Buchanan, Hope, Kelly, Kenny and Scorgie. The Canberra Times' W. L. Hoffman noticed that "there are six tunes, all of them interesting and, again, all of them written by [Kelly or Kenny]." Hoffman praised the title track, "it is a neatly structured, very bluesy piece, with Ton Buchanan's saxophone threading through the tune, bringing it all together" while "the sounds continue on the second side, smooth, singing music as is characteristic of Crossfire."

During 1982 Crossfire undertook an international tour through India, Holland, England and the United States. The group's performance at the Montreux Jazz Festival on 16 July 1982 was recorded. It was released as their second live album, Live at Montreux (July 1983). The ensemble were Bloxsom on percussion and mallets, Buchanan on saxophones and shakers, Kelly, Kenny, Lyon and Mark Riley on drums. Eric Myers declared, in the July–August edition of Jazz magazine, that the gig showed the group "playing original music that is an outgrowth of our own culture, can take their place on the international stage with the best of them ... a great moment for Crossfire and a high point for Australian music." The group disbanded later that year. Their performance at the Basement in Sydney was broadcast on ABC radio's The Burrows Collection for the episode, "Ten Years On – The Basement" in August 1984. The gig had included guest vocals from Erana Clark and Barry Leaf.

Crossfire reunited briefly in 1991 and issued another album, Tension Release; with the line-up of Bloxsom, Buchanan, Hopes, Kelly, Kenny and Lyon. In July that year they promoted its release with a series of gigs in Sydney. They also did a backing band for the Randy Brecker tour at that time

== Discography ==
=== Studio albums ===
List of albums, with selected chart positions
Title	Album details	Peak chart positions
Title	Album details	AUS
Crossfire	Released: November 1975; Format: LP; Label: Harvest (SHVL 616)	90
Direct to Disc	Released: 1978; Format: LP; Label:	-
East of Where	Released: September 1980; Format: LP; Label: WEA (600072)	88
Hysterical Rochords	Released: 1982; Format: Label:	-
Tension Release	Released: July 1991; Format: Label:	-

=== Live albums ===
List of albums, with selected chart positions
Title	Album details	Peak chart positions
Title	Album details	AUS
Michael Franks with Crossfire Live (Michael Franks with Crossfire)	Released: 1980; Format: LP; Label: WEA (6000084)	92
Crossfire Live at Montreux	Released: July 1983; Format: Label:	-
