= Embossing tape =

Labelling medium

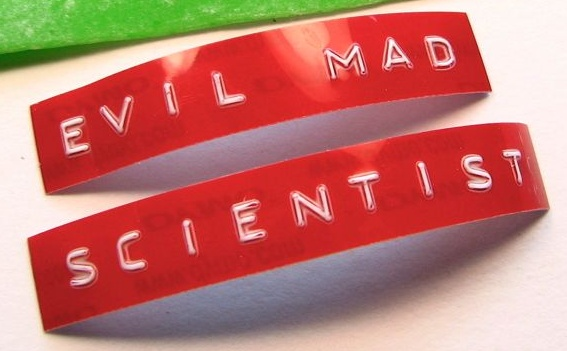
A label made with embossing tape

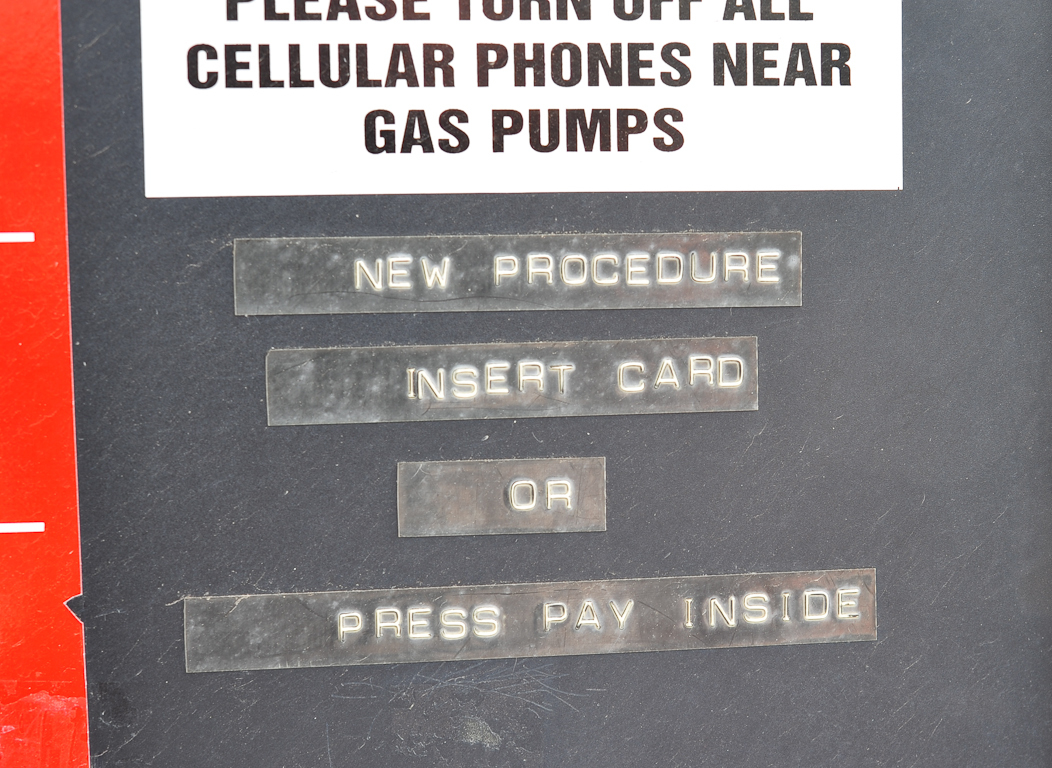
Embossing tape used to add instructions to a gas pump

Embossing tape is a labelling medium usually of hard plastic. Embossing tape is used with embossing machines, often handheld. The company name and trademark "Dymo" is often associated with this sort of label as their CEO Rudolph Hurwich first introduced it as a consumer product in 1958. Embossing tape has largely been replaced with thermal transfer printing tape used by label printers.

== Method ==
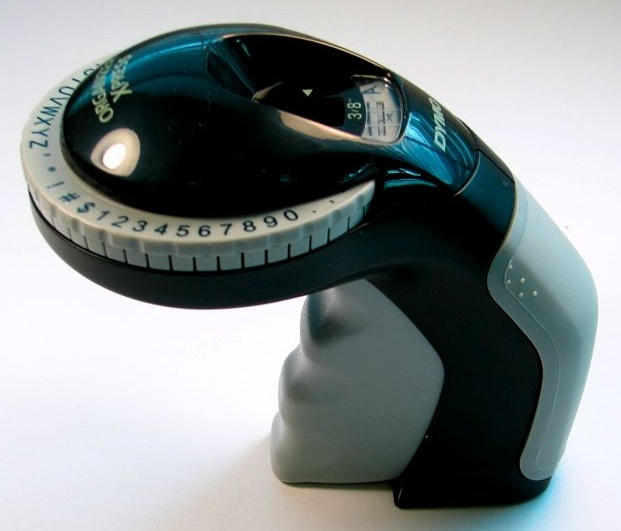
A Dymo brand tape embosser

The machine features multiple embossing dies arranged on two parallel wheels. Each character has one positive die and one negative die. Typically all of the negative dies are constructed on one rigid wheel, while all the positive dies are constructed on a divided flexible wheel, similar to the daisy wheel of a daisy wheel printer. The user turns the wheel to align the desired character with the tape and then presses a trigger, which forces one positive die against the tape, which deforms some of the tape into the negative die. Upon releasing the trigger, a mechanism advances the tape to the next character position. The embossed characters stand out from the tape and look white due to the stretching of the plastic.

Embossing tape and the embossing device itself are relatively inexpensive to buy, usually around $10 from stationery stores. Because of this, embossing tape has found popularity with children and adolescents. Unlike paper labels, embossing tape is very durable, does not fade over time, rarely leaves a sticky residue, and does not break upon removal.

Because of the method for embossing, the characters can only be white in color. Sometimes, the adhesive backing of the tape can weaken, especially if it is placed in liquid or dust. The tape is more rigid than most other labeling materials, and may come loose if the labeled object bends, or the label is not straightened after being printed, as they come out of the embosser with a curve to them.

== Braille label maker ==
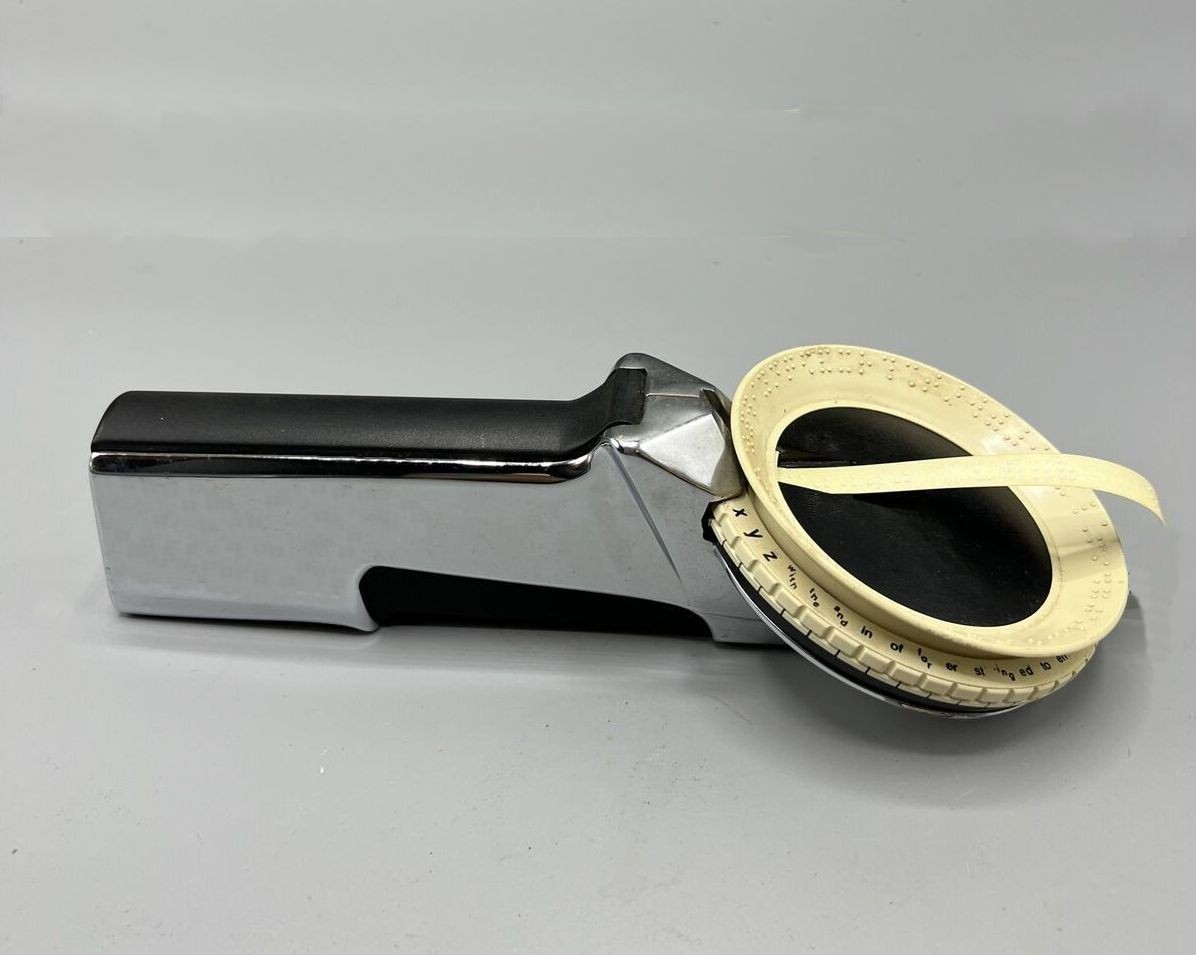
Embossed labeler for Braille code

There are also portable Braille labelers, made by various manufacturers (Dymo, Scotch, Reizen), which use the same mechanics and tapes as those with other glyphs but with a Braille wheel. The embossed shape is particularly practical for use by the blind or visually impaired. Braille labelers also allow the use of aluminum labeling tape, which is specifically designed to be used with Braille boards and can be easily attached to the surfaces to be labeled, being more resistant to wear than vinyl.

== Graphic design ==
Because of the distinctly industrial, workaday image of embossing tape, it has been common for designers to use images of embossing tape as lettering. The practice was particularly common during the "grunge typography" graphic design period of the 1990s and 2000s, which often used composited images produced by computer. Embossing tape lettering has been used by bands such as Snow Patrol and The Libertines and poet Rick Holland; it may be intended to evoke labelling used to mark magnetic tapes or radiographs.
