= Direct to Disc (Crossfire album) =

Studio album by Crossfire
- Released: 1978
- Genre: Jazz fusion
- Label: Trafalgar Records

Crossfire chronology
| Crossfire (1975) | Direct to Disc (1978) | East of Where (1980) |

Direct to Disc is the second studio album by Australian jazz-fusion band Crossfire released on the Trafalgar Records label and distributed by Warner Music in 1978. It was recorded using the direct to disc recording method, hence the title of the record.

The album was recorded at RCA Australia's North Ryde facility in late 1978. The band set up in RCA's factory, mixing was done in an ABC Radio/TV van positioned in the car park, and audio was fed back to RCA's disc cutting lathe from there. It was Australia's first direct-to-disc recording of the era. The direct-to-disc method had developed internationally as a way to reduce distortion and noise from the use of a tape medium. Then came digital.

== Track listing ==
1. It Coitainly Was
2. On the Wings of Albatrocity
3. Fahannokookin'
4. Oddball
5. Satie-ated

== Personnel ==
- Jim Kelly (guitars)
- Mick Kenny (Wurlitzer piano, fluegelhorn)
- Ian Bloxsom (percussion)
- Don Reid (saxophones, flute)
- Greg Lyon (bass)
- Doug Gallacher (drums)
