= Label printer =

Device for printing adhesive labels

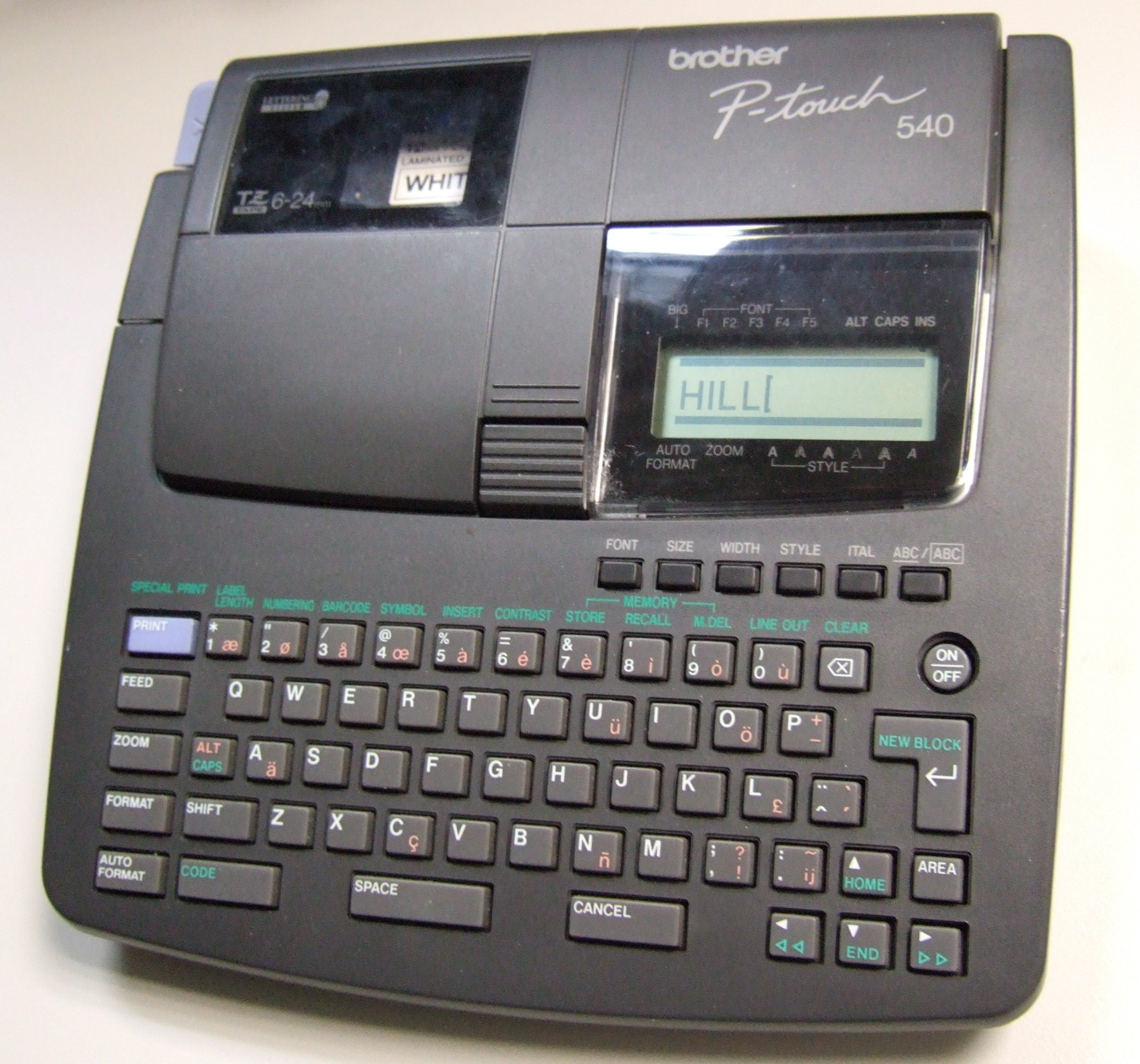
Brother P-Touch 540 label printer

A label printer is a computer printer that prints on self-adhesive label material and/or card-stock (tags). A label printer with built-in keyboard and display for stand-alone use (not connected to a separate computer) is often called a label maker. Label printers are different from ordinary printers because they need to have special feed mechanisms to handle rolled stock, or tear sheet (fanfold) stock. Common connectivity for label printers includes RS-232 serial, Universal Serial Bus (USB), parallel, Ethernet and various kinds of Wireless. Label printers have a wide variety of applications, including supply chain management, retail price marking, packaging labels, blood and laboratory specimen marking, and fixed assets management.

== Mechanisms ==
Label printers use a wide range of label materials, including paper and synthetic polymer ("plastic") materials. Several types of print mechanisms are also used, including laser and impact, but thermal printer mechanisms are perhaps the most common.

There are two common types of thermal printer:

- Direct thermal printers use heat sensitive paper (similar to thermal fax paper). Direct thermal labels tend to fade over time (typically 6 to 12 months). Their life is shortened when exposed to heat, direct sunlight or chemical vapors. Therefore, direct thermal labels are primarily used for short duration applications, such as shipping labels.
- Thermal transfer printers use heat to transfer ink from a ribbon onto the label for a permanent print. Some thermal transfer printers are also capable of direct thermal printing. Using PVC (vinyl) can increase the longevity of the label as seen in pipe markers and industrial safety labels found in much of the marketplace today.

There are three grades of ribbon for use with thermal transfer printers. Wax, the most popular, has some smudge resistance and is suitable for matte and semi-gloss paper labels. Wax/resin is smudge resistant and suitable for semi-gloss paper and some synthetic labels. Resin is scratch and chemical resistant and suitable for coated synthetic labels.

When printing on continuous label stock, there is a tendency for the print location to shift slightly from label to label. To ensure registration of the print area with the target media, many label printers use a sensor that detects a gap, notch, line or perforation between labels. This allows the printer to adjust the intake of label stock so the print aligns correctly with the media.

== Types ==
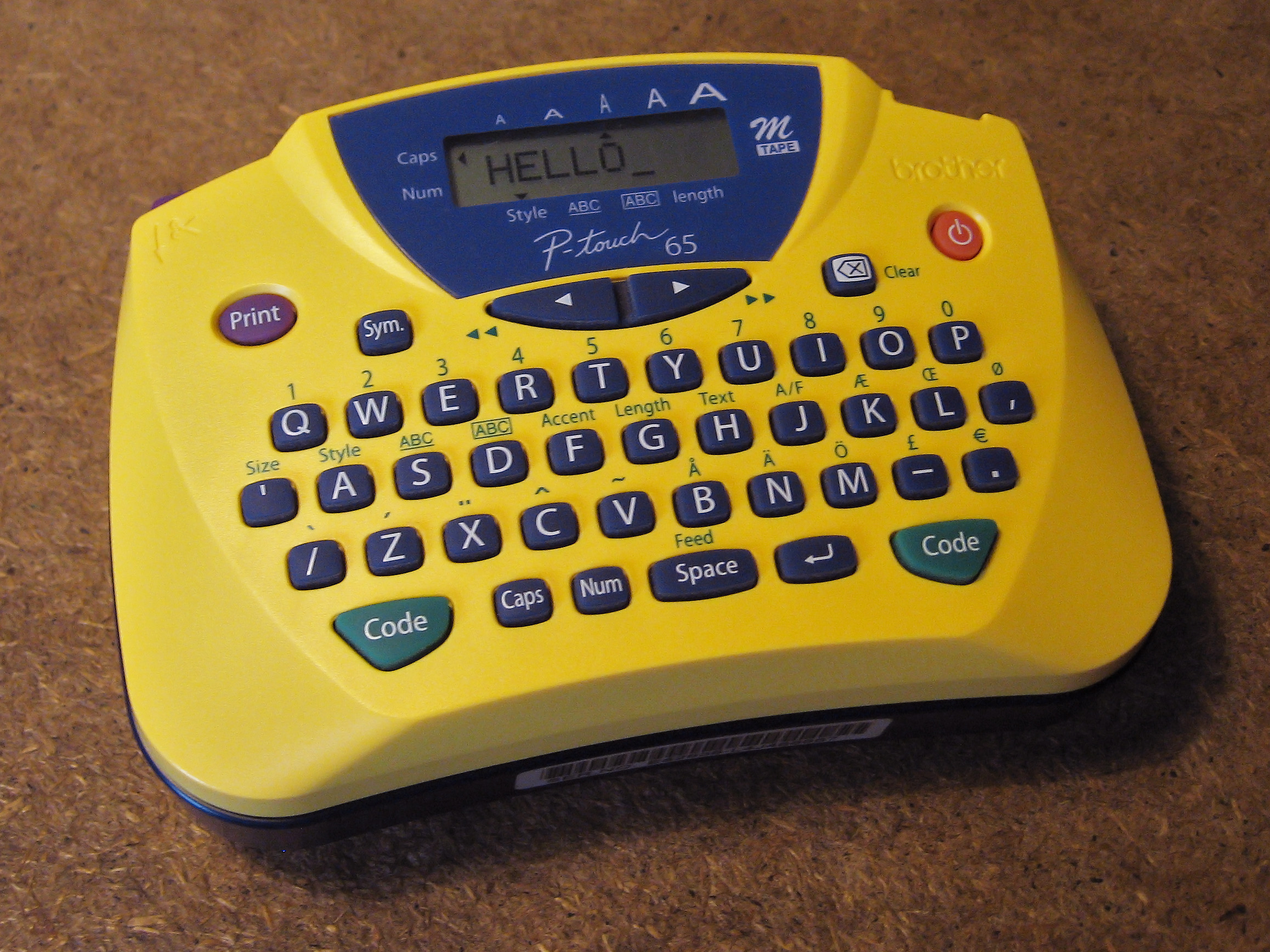
Control panel of a typical low-end label maker (circa 2005) showing the LCD

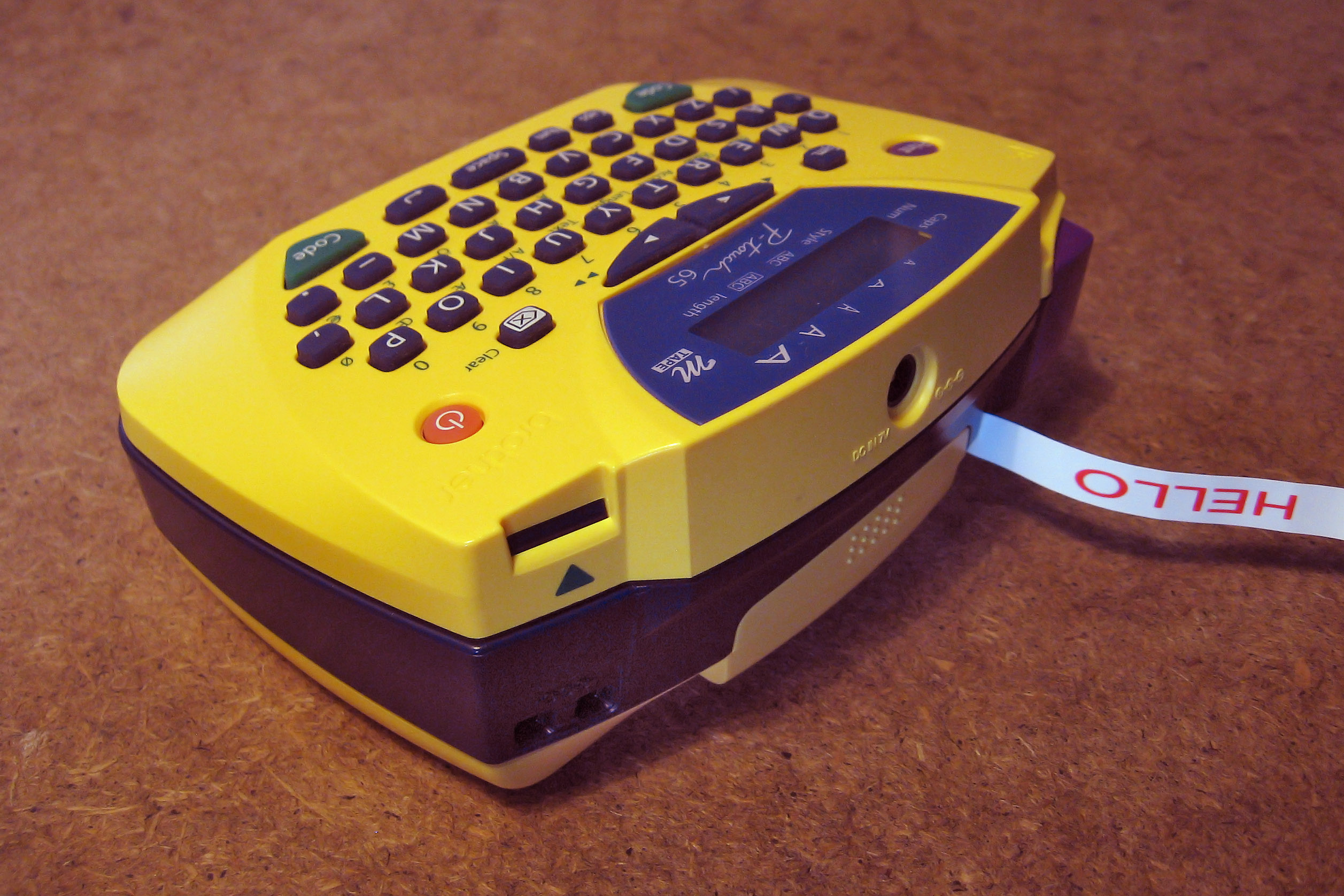
Labels appear out the back. The device includes a cutting mechanism (purple button, back right) and backing stripper (back left)

Label printer capabilities vary between home, corporate and industrial-oriented models.

Desktop label printers
These are usually designed for light to medium-duty use with a roll of stock up to 100 mm (4 in) wide. They are quiet and inexpensive. Commercial label printers can typically hold a larger roll of stock up to 200 mm (8 in) wide and are geared for medium-volume printing.
Industrial label printers
These are designed for heavy-duty, continuous operation in warehouses, distribution centers and factories. Additionally, industrial portable label printers are designed for heavy-duty operation on location. They are usually handheld and come with an industrial hard case. Examples of applications are labeling for electrical installations, construction sites, and production floors where there are no computers.
RFID readers
These are specialized label printers that print and encode at the same time on RFID transponders (tags) enclosed in paper or printable synthetic materials. RFID tags need to have printed information for backwards compatibility with barcode systems, so human users can identify the tag.
Label printer applicators
These are designed to automate the labeling process. These systems are common in manufacturing and warehousing facilities that require cases and pallets to be labeled for shipping.
Labelling software
This runs on a general-purpose personal computer, and is designed to create and/or format labels for printing. The software can use native OS printer drivers, or embed drivers in the software, bypassing the OS print subsystem. It may work with dedicated label printers as described in this article, or use sheet- or continuous-fed labels in a general-purpose computer printer.
Personal label printers or label makers
These are handheld or small desktop devices. They are intended for home office and small business use. The cost of these printers is generally very low, making them popular with low volume users; but they print on special tapes, often thermal, which are usually expensive as is the case of Seiko Smart label. In the past, mechanical systems which worked by embossing a colored plastic tape, called embossing tape, were common. A hammer in the shape of the letter caused a letter-shaped extrusion on the opposite side of the tape. The raised plastic would discolor, providing visual contrast. Today, this type has been almost completely displaced by electronic thermal transfer devices with built-in keyboard and display, and an integrated cartridge containing the label material (and print ribbon, if used).

== See also ==
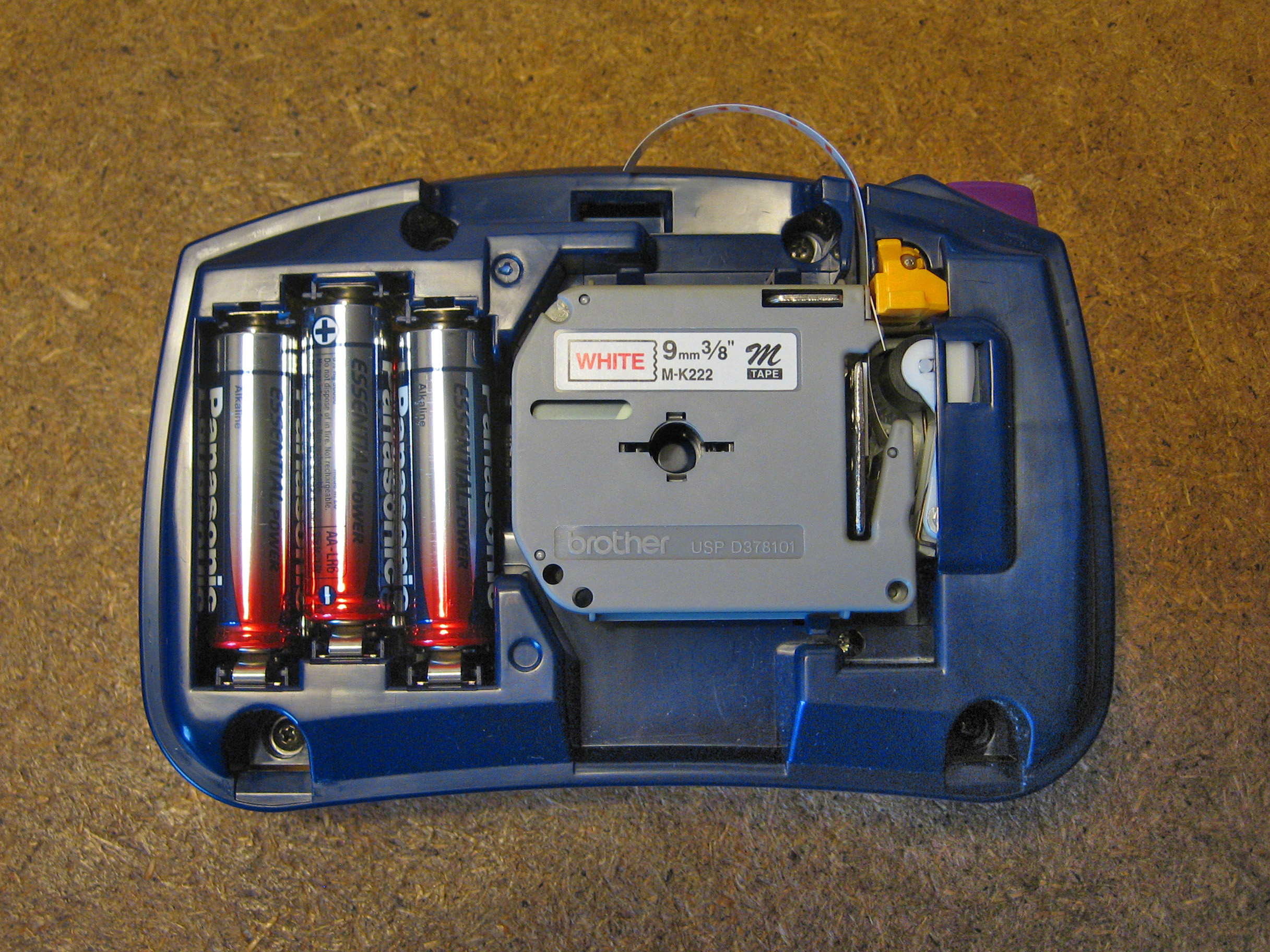
Rear cover removed to show the mechanism including tape cartridge and feed path

- Barcode printer
- Barcode
- Computer printer
- Embossing tape
- SureThing
