= Smart label =

A smart label, also called a smart tag, is an extremely flat configured transponder under a conventional print-coded label, which includes chip, antenna and bonding wires as a so-called inlay. The labels, made of paper, fabric or plastics, are prepared as a paper roll with the inlays laminated between the rolled carrier and the label media for use in specially designed printer units.

In many processes in logistics and transportation, the barcode, or the 2D-barcode, is well established as the key means for identification in short distance. Whereas the automation of such optical coding is limited in appropriate distance for reading success and usually requires manual operation for finding the code or scanner gates that scan all the surface of a coded object, the RFID-inlay allows for better tolerance in fully automated reading from a certain specified distance. However, the mechanical vulnerability of the RFID-inlay is higher than the ordinary label, which has its weaknesses in its resistance to scratch.

Thus, the smartness of the smart label is earned in compensation of typical weaknesses with the combination of the technologies of plain text, optical character recognition and radio code.

== Processing ==
The processing of these labels is basically as with ordinary labels in all stages of production and application, except the inlay is inserted in an automated processing step to ensure identical positioning for each label and careful processing to prevent any damage to the bonding. The printing is processed in two steps, including

- normal ink-jet printing, except the space with the bonded chip, with clearly intelligible text and
- either barcode or 2D barcode for later semi-automatic reading with handheld readers or fix-mount scanners
- writing coherently concatenated information to the RFID-chip
- reading the written information on the RFID-chip subsequently in the printer for control purpose (read after write)

== Classification ==
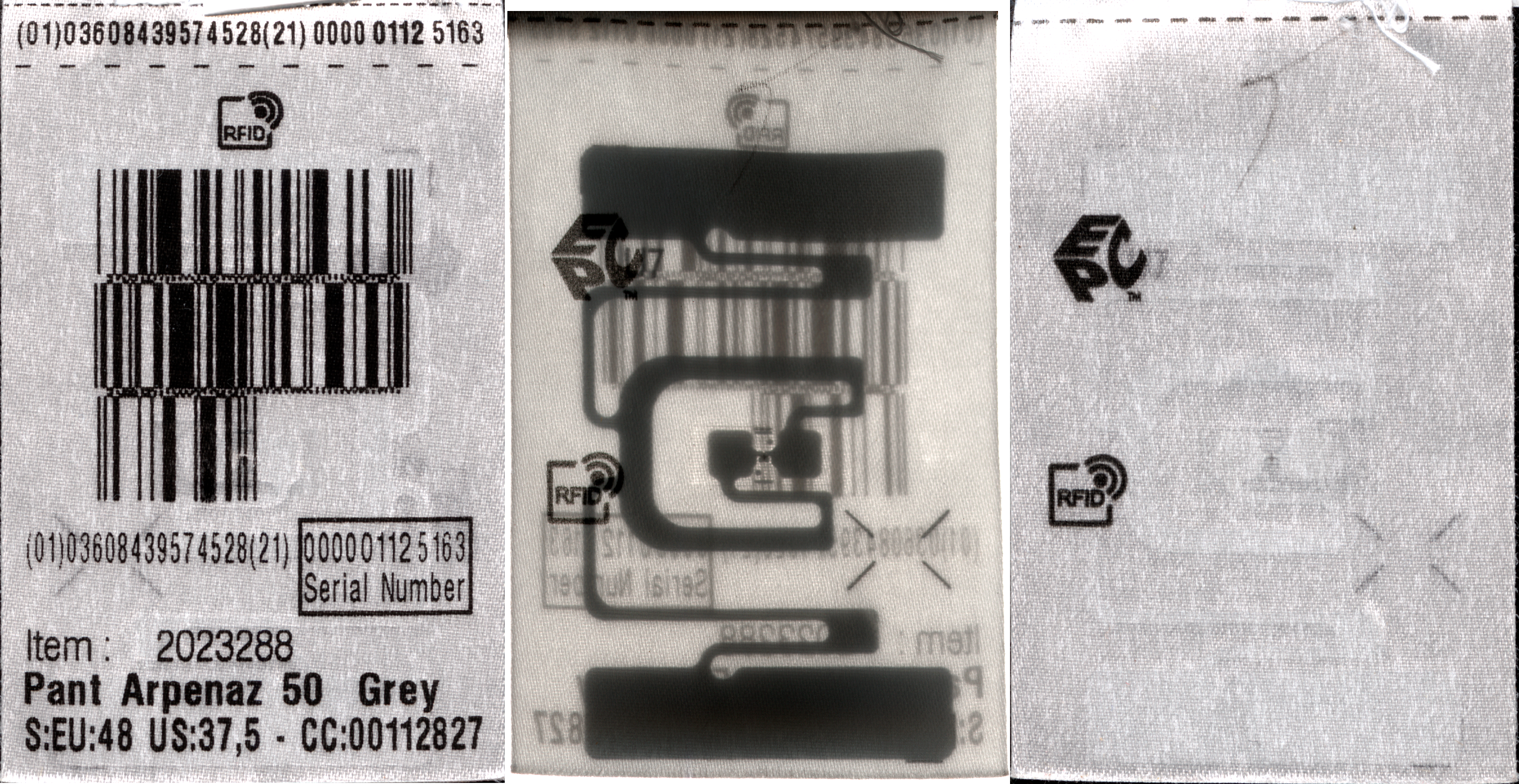
Sewn-in RFID label in garment

=== Chip labels ===
Customisation of smart labels is available with chip cards. Also combinations of magnetic stripes with RFID chips are used, especially for credit cards.

=== Printable labels ===
Replacing silicon processors, smart tags that are printed collect information themselves and process it. The result of decades of research and development by ThinFilm Electronics are “printed transistors, the multilayer tags combine a year’s worth of battery power, sensors and a small display, and will initially be used to show a temperature record of perishable food and medications. Roughly 3 x 1.5 inches in size and consisting of five layers sandwiched in a roll-to-roll production process, the ThinFilm labels use the company’s own ferroelectric polymer technology for storing information. Chains of non-toxic polymers can be flipped between two orientations – representing binary “0″ and “1″ – to store non-volatile data.”

=== Electronic labels ===
While price increases when labels are electronic, the very small percentage of labels that are electric is increasing. Electronic labels have features that supersede non-electronic labels. Electronic versions can signal what is happening in real-time and most can store a digital record.

== Application ==
Smart labels are applied directly to packages or to pallets or other shipping containers. The application directly to the product is still of neglectible importance due to the following:

- Cost of the labels, which may be justified easier for agglomerations of more than one product
- All products that are metallic, liquid or sufficiently high in electrical permittivity, work to reflect or reduce the radio waves
- Handling, which normally addresses the package and lesser the unpacked product.

== Use ==
The technologies with the smart labels are all mature and well standardised. After the first wave of technology hype with RFID, current consolidation in the market shows hard competitive Darwinism. With increasing sales quantities, the inlays are still annually redesigned and appear in releases with new extensions to performance. However, the integration of RFID to handling processes requires sound engineering to ensure the balance of benefit and effort.

In 2008, ThinFilm and Polyera announced their partnership to produce high volumes of smart labels. The collaboration brings printed integrated systems, such as smart sensor tags, closer to commercial availability.

== See also ==
- Barcode
- Barcode#2D barcodes
- Radio-frequency identification
- Track and trace
