= Inkjet printable DVD =

An inkjet printable DVD is a DVD made with an inkjet ink permeable coating on the upper, non-recording surface of the DVD. This allows compatible CD/DVD inkjet printers to print directly onto the disc. Inkjet printable DVD media offers a way to customize DVD-Rs.

When inserted into a suitable inkjet printer, it is capable of reproducing inkjet printer page output. Along with inkjet, there are also alternative methods that are similar but use different methods or materials, such as thermal transfer. With the printing done by a machine, the positioning of the label is automatic.
