= Traffolyte =

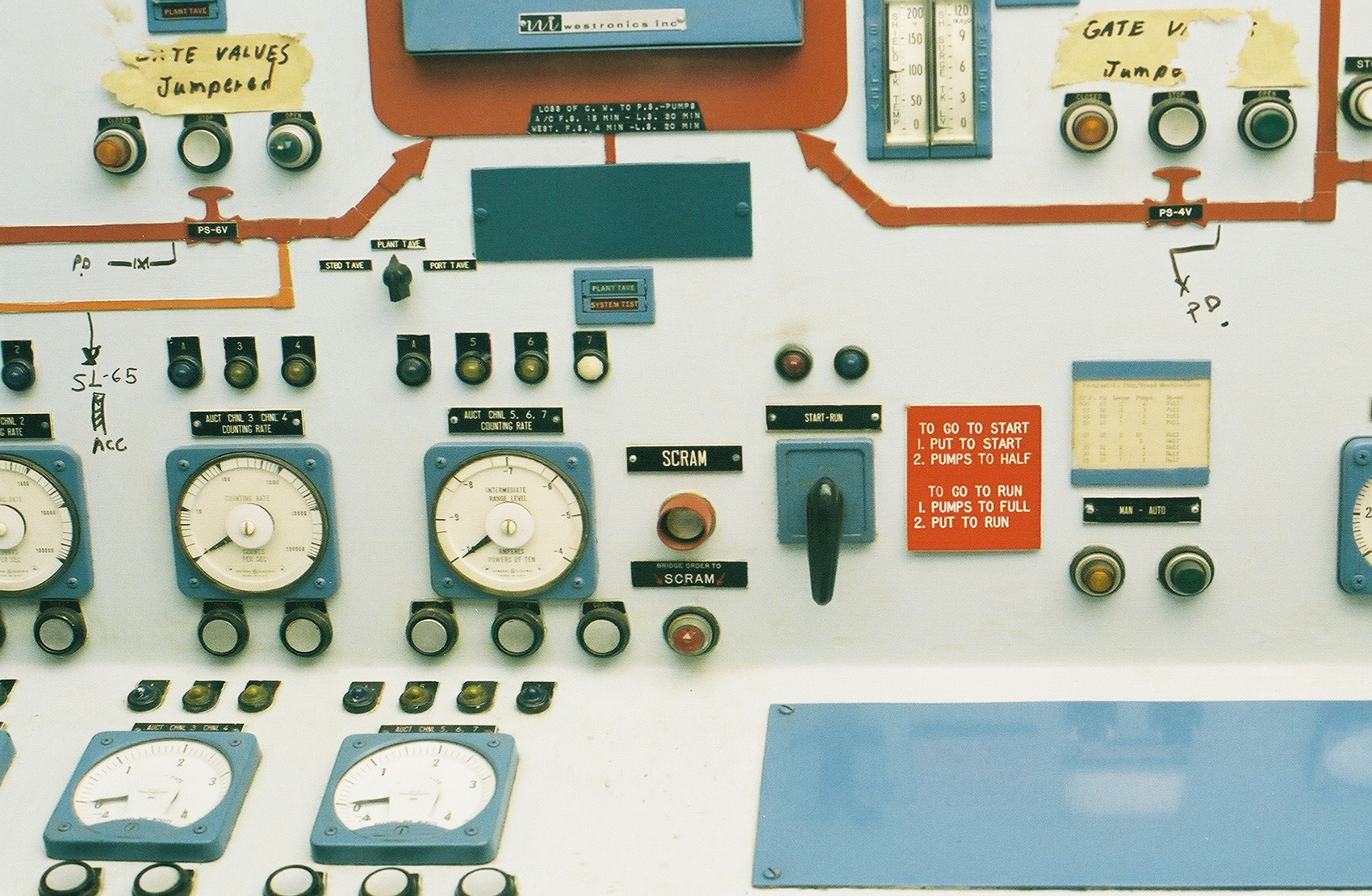
Section of the NS Savannah reactor control panel with engraved phenolic plastic labels

Traffolyte, sometimes spelled Traffolite, was a brand name for multi-layered phenolic plastic sheets suitable for engraving. Each layer was a different colour so engraved letters or shapes would be a different colour from the unengraved portions. Thus it could be used for name tags, labels and signs.

== History ==
The material dates back to 1927, when it was first produced by Metropolitan-Vickers Electrical Ltd. at their Trafford Park factory in Manchester, UK for transformer labels. The complete business was sold to De La Rue Insulation Ltd in 1945; De La Rue exited this business in the early 1960s. There are a large number of companies manufacturing bi- and tri-layer phenolic engraving stock and it has become a generic term; no record of its having been a registered trademark in the United States or UK has been found.

== Hazards ==
Traffolyte signs and labels are cheap to produce, and were very popular in the past. However, phenolic dust is now recognized as a health hazard and so precautions must be taken during label production.
