= List of statutory rules of Northern Ireland, 1999 =

This is an incomplete list of statutory rules of Northern Ireland in 1999.

== 1-100 ==
- Potatoes Originating in the Netherlands (Notification) Regulations (Northern Ireland) 1999 (S.R. 1999 No. 1)
- Social Security (Categorisation of Earners) (Amendment) Regulations (Northern Ireland) 1999 (S.R. 1999 No. 2)
- Protection of Water Against Agricultural Nitrate Pollution (Amendment) Regulations (Northern Ireland) 1999 (S.R. 1999 No. 3)
- Gaming (Variation of Monetary Limits) Order (Northern Ireland) 1999 (S.R. 1999 No. 4)
- Gaming (Bingo (Amendment) and Gaming Machine (Registered Clubs)) Regulations (Northern Ireland) 1999 (S.R. 1999 No. 5)
- Magistrates' Courts (Amendment) Rules (Northern Ireland) 1999 (S.R. 1999 No. 6)
- Magistrates' Courts (Criminal Justice (Children)) Rules (Northern Ireland) 1999 (S.R. 1999 No. 7)
- Motor Vehicles (Construction and Use) (Amendment) Regulations (Northern Ireland) 1999 (S.R. 1999 No. 9)
- Education (Certified Contracts) Regulations (Northern Ireland) 1999 (S.R. 1999 No. 10)
- Health and Personal Social Services (Northern Ireland) Order 1972 (Amendment) Order (Northern Ireland) 1999 (S.R. 1999 No. 11)
- Fisheries (Amendment) Byelaws (Northern Ireland) 1999 (S.R. 1999 No. 12)
- Confined Spaces Regulations (Northern Ireland) 1999 (S.R. 1999 No. 13)
- Genetically Modified Organisms (Contained Used) (Amendment) Regulations (Northern Ireland) 1999 (S.R. 1999 No. 14)
- Health Services (Tribunal and Disciplinary Procedures) (Amendment) Regulations (Northern Ireland) 1999 (S.R. 1999 No. 15)
- Health Services (Pilot Schemes: Travelling Expenses and Remission of Charges) Regulations (Northern Ireland) 1999 (S.R. 1999 No. 16)
- Health Services (Pilot Schemes: Dental Charges) Regulations (Northern Ireland) 1999 (S.R. 1999 No. 17)
- Rules of the Supreme Court (Northern Ireland) (Amendment) 1999 (S.R. 1999 No. 19)
- Registered Rents (Increase) Order (Northern Ireland) 1999 (S.R. 1999 No. 20)
- Wills and Administration Proceedings (1994 Order) (Commencement No. 2) Order (Northern Ireland) 1999 (S.R. 1999 No. 21)
- Plant Health (Amendment) Order (Northern Ireland) 1999 (S.R. 1999 No. 24)
- Criminal Justice (Children) (1998 Order) (Commencement No. 2) Order (Northern Ireland) 1999 (S.R. 1999 No. 25)
- Industrial Pollution Control (Prescribed Processes and Substances) (Amendment) Regulations (Northern Ireland) 1999 (S.R. 1999 No. 26)
- Street Works (1995 Order) (Commencement No. 4) Order (Northern Ireland) 1999 (S.R. 1999 No. 27)
- Juvenile Justice Centre Rules (Northern Ireland) 1999 (S.R. 1999 No. 28)
- Scheme for Construction Contracts in Northern Ireland Regulations (Northern Ireland) 1999 (S.R. 1999 No. 32)
- Construction Contracts Exclusion Order (Northern Ireland) 1999 (S.R. 1999 No. 33)
- Construction Contracts (1997 Order) (Commencement) Order (Northern Ireland) 1999 (S.R. 1999 No. 34)
- Income Support (General) (Standard Interest Rate Amendment) Regulations (Northern Ireland) 1999 (S.R. 1999 No. 35)
- Control of Substances Hazardous to Health (Amendment) Regulations (Northern Ireland) 1999 (S.R. 1999 No. 36)
- Taxis (Coleraine, Portstewart and Portrush) Bye-Laws (Northern Ireland) 1999 (S.R. 1999 No. 40)
- Taxis (Ballymoney) Bye-Laws (Northern Ireland) 1999 (S.R. 1999 No. 41)
- Child Benefit (Residence and Persons Abroad) (Amendment) Regulations (Northern Ireland) 1999 (S.R. 1999 No. 42)
- Foyle Area (Licensing of Fishing Engines) (Amendment) Regulations 1999 (S.R. 1999 No. 45)
- Deseasonalisation Premium (Protection of Payments) (Amendment) Regulations (Northern Ireland) 1999 (S.R. 1999 No. 46)
- Police (1998 Act) (Commencement No. 2) Order (Northern Ireland) 1999 (S.R. 1999 No. 48)
- Guaranteed Minimum Pensions Increase Order (Northern Ireland) 1999 (S.R. 1999 No. 49)
- Social Security Benefits Up-rating Order (Northern Ireland) 1999 (S.R. 1999 No. 50)
- Social Security (Contributions) (Re-rating and Northern Ireland National Insurance Fund Payments) Order (Northern Ireland) 1999 (S.R. 1999 No. 51)
- Employers's Contributions Re-imbursement (Amendment) Regulations (Northern Ireland) 1999 (S.R. 1999 No. 52)
- Family Homes and Domestic Violence (1998 Order) (Commencement No. 1) Order (Northern Ireland) 1999 (S.R. 1999 No. 56)
- Plant Protection Products (Amendment) Regulations (Northern Ireland) 1999 (S.R. 1999 No. 57)
- Rates (Amendment) (1998 Order) (Commencement No. 1) Order (Northern Ireland) 1999 (S.R. 1999 No. 58)
- Marketing and Use of Dangerous Substances Regulations (Northern Ireland) 1999 (S.R. 1999 No. 59)
- Health and Personal Social Services (Fund-holding Practices) (Amendment) Regulations (Northern Ireland) 1999 (S.R. 1999 No. 60)
- Family Homes and Domestic Violence (Allocation of Proceedings) Order (Northern Ireland) 1999 (S.R. 1999 No. 61)
- Magistrates' Courts (Domestic Proceedings) (Amendment) Rules (Northern Ireland) 1999 (S.R. 1999 No. 62)
- Magistrates' Courts (Children (Northern Ireland) Order 1995) (Amendment) Rules (Northern Ireland) 1999 (S.R. 1999 No. 63)
- Social Security (Contributions) (Re-rating) Consequential Amendment Regulations (Northern Ireland) 1999 (S.R. 1999 No. 64)
- Statutory Maternity Pay (Compensation of Employers) (Amendment) Regulations (Northern Ireland) 1999 (S.R. 1999 No. 65)
- Hill Livestock (Compensatory Allowances) (Amendment) Regulations (Northern Ireland) 1999 (S.R. 1999 No. 68)
- Lough Neagh (Levels) Scheme (Confirmation) Order (Northern Ireland) 1999 (S.R. 1999 No. 69)
- Income Support (General) (Standard Interest Rate Amendment No. 2) Regulations (Northern Ireland) 1999 (S.R. 1999 No. 70)
- Health Services (Primary Care) (1997 Order) (Commencement No. 3) Order (Northern Ireland) 1999 (S.R. 1999 No. 71)
- Social Security (1998 Order) (Commencement No. 3) Order (Northern Ireland) 1999 (S.R. 1999 No. 72)
- Planning (Environmental Impact Assessment) Regulations (Northern Ireland) 1999 (S.R. 1999 No. 73)
- Motor Vehicles (Driving Licences) (Amendment) Regulations (Northern Ireland) 1999 (S.R. 1999 No. 77)
- Motor Vehicle Testing (Amendment) (Fees) Regulations (Northern Ireland) 1999 (S.R. 1999 No. 78)
- Goods Vehicles (Testing) (Amendment) (Fees) Regulations (Northern Ireland) 1999 (S.R. 1999 No. 79)
- Fair Employment and Treatment (1998 Order) (Commencement No. 1) Order (Northern Ireland) 1999 (S.R. 1999 No. 81)
- Fair Employment and Treatment (1998 Order) (Saving and Transitional Provisions) Order (Northern Ireland) 1999 (S.R. 1999 No. 82)
- Food Safety (Fishery Products and Live Shellfish) (Hygiene) (Amendment) Regulations (Northern Ireland) 1999 (S.R. 1999 No. 83)
- Weights and Measures (Quantity Marking and Abbreviations of Units) Regulations (Northern Ireland) 1999 (S.R. 1999 No. 84)
- Rates (Regional Rates) Order (Northern Ireland) 1999 (S.R. 1999 No. 86)
- Social Security Benefits Up-rating (Amendment)Order (Northern Ireland) 1999 (S.R. 1999 No. 87)
- Family Proceedings (Amendment) Rules (Northern Ireland) 1999 (S.R. 1999 No. 88)
- Roads (Environmental Impact Assessment) Regulations (Northern Ireland) 1999 (S.R. 1999 No. 89)
- Health and Safety (Enforcing Authority) Regulations (Northern Ireland) 1999 (S.R. 1999 No. 90)
- Class Sizes in Primary Schools Regulations (Northern Ireland) 1999 (S.R. 1999 No. 91)
- Family Homes and Domestic Violence (1998 Order) (Commencement No. 2) Order (Northern Ireland) 1999 (S.R. 1999 No. 92)
- Spreadable Fats (Marketing Standards) (Amendment) Regulations (Northern Ireland) 1999 (S.R. 1999 No. 93)
- Social Security (Industrial Injuries) (Dependency) (Permitted Earnings Limits) Order (Northern Ireland) 1999 (S.R. 1999 No. 94)
- Legal Advice and Assistance (Amendment) Regulations (Northern Ireland) 1999 (S.R. 1999 No. 95)
- Health and Safety at Work (1998 Order) (Commencement) Order (Northern Ireland) 1999 (S.R. 1999 No. 96)
- Sex Discrimination Code of Practice (Equal Pay) (Appointed Day) Order (Northern Ireland) 1999 (S.R. 1999 No. 98)
- Proceeds of Crime (Countries and Territories designated under the Criminal Justice Act 1988) (1998 Order) (Amendment) (Northern Ireland) Order 1999 (S.R. 1999 No. 99)
- Health Services (Pilot Schemes: Miscellaneous Provisions and Consequential Amendments) Regulations (Northern Ireland) 1999 (S.R. 1999 No. 100)

== 101-200 ==
- Road Humps Regulations (Northern Ireland) 1999 (S.R. 1999 No. 101)
- Social Security (1998 Order) (Commencement No. 4) Order (Northern Ireland) 1999 (S.R. 1999 No. 102)
- Motor Vehicles (Construction and Use) (Amendment No. 2) Regulations (Northern Ireland) 1999 (S.R. 1999 No. 103)
- Motor Vehicles (Construction and Use) (Amendment No. 3) Regulations (Northern Ireland) 1999 (S.R. 1999 No. 104)
- Dental Charges (Amendment) Regulations (Northern Ireland) 1999 (S.R. 1999 No. 105)
- Occupational and Personal Pension Schemes (Levy) (Amendment) Regulations (Northern Ireland) 1999 (S.R. 1999 No. 106)
- Social Security (Miscellaneous Amendments) Regulations (Northern Ireland) 1999 (S.R. 1999 No. 107)
- Superannuation (Planning Appeals Commission) Order (Northern Ireland) 1999 (S.R. 1999 No. 108)
- Pensions Increase (Review) Order (Northern Ireland) 1999 (S.R. 1999 No. 109)
- Specified Diseases (Notification and Movement Restrictions) (Amendment) Order (Northern Ireland) 1999 (S.R. 1999 No. 110)
- Optical Charges and Payments (Amendment) Regulations (Northern Ireland) 1999 (S.R. 1999 No. 111)
- General Ophthalmic Services (Amendment) Regulations (Northern Ireland) 1999 (S.R. 1999 No. 112)
- Workmen's Compensation (Supplementation) (Amendment) Regulations (Northern Ireland) 1999 (S.R. 1999 No. 113)
- Pesticides (Maximum Residue Levels in Crops, Food and Feeding Stuffs) (EEC Limits) (Amendment) Regulations (Northern Ireland) 1999 (S.R. 1999 No. 114)
- Producer Responsibility Obligations (Packaging waste) Regulations (Northern Ireland) 1999 (S.R. 1999 No. 115)
- Horse Passports Regulations (Northern Ireland) 1999 (S.R. 1999 No. 116)
- Social Security (Contributions), Statutory Maternity Pay and Statutory Sick Pay (Miscellaneous Amendments) Regulations (Northern Ireland) 1999 (S.R. 1999 No. 117)
- Social Security (Contributions and Credits) (Miscellaneous Amendments) Regulations (Northern Ireland) 1999 (S.R. 1999 No. 118)
- Social Security (Contributions) (Amendment) Regulations (Northern Ireland) 1999 (S.R. 1999 No. 119)
- Arable Area Payments (Amendment) Regulations (Northern Ireland) 1999 (S.R. 1999 No. 120)
- Traffic Signs (Temporary Obstructions) Regulations (Northern Ireland) 1999 (S.R. 1999 No. 121)
- Construction Plant and Equipment (Noise Emission) (Amendment) Regulations (Northern Ireland) 1999 (S.R. 1999 No. 123)
- Electrical Equipment for Explosive Atmospheres (Certification) (Amendment) Regulations (Northern Ireland) 1999 (S.R. 1999 No. 124)
- Equipment and Protective Systems Intended for Use in Potentially Explosive Atmospheres (Amendment) Regulations (Northern Ireland) 1999 (S.R. 1999 No. 125)
- Pressure Vessels (Verification) (Amendment) Regulations (Northern Ireland) 1999 (S.R. 1999 No. 126)
- Export of Dangerous Chemicals (Amendment) Regulations (Northern Ireland) 1999 (S.R. 1999 No. 127)
- Gas Cylinders (Pattern Approval) (Amendment) Regulations (Northern Ireland) 1999 (S.R. 1999 No. 128)
- County Court (Amendment) Rules (Northern Ireland) 1999 (S.R. 1999 No. 129)
- Legal Advice and Assistance (Financial Conditions) Regulations (Northern Ireland) 1999 (S.R. 1999 No. 130)
- Legal Advice and Assistance (Amendment) Regulations (Northern Ireland) 1999 (S.R. 1999 No. 131)
- Legal Aid (Financial Conditions) Regulations (Northern Ireland) 1999 (S.R. 1999 No. 132)
- Working Time (Amendment) Regulations (Northern Ireland) 1999 (S.R. 1999 No. 133)
- Crown Court (Amendment) Rules (Northern Ireland) 1999 (S.R. 1999 No. 134)
- Supreme Court Fees (Amendment) Order (Northern Ireland) 1999 (S.R. 1999 No. 135)
- County Court Fees (Amendment) Order (Northern Ireland) 1999 (S.R. 1999 No. 136)
- Social Security (Overlapping Benefits) (Amendment) Regulations (Northern Ireland) 1999 (S.R. 1999 No. 137)
- Social Security Benefits Up-rating and Miscellaneous Increases Regulations (Northern Ireland) 1999 (S.R. 1999 No. 138)
- Social Security Benefits Up-rating Regulations (Northern Ireland) 1999 (S.R. 1999 No. 139)
- Processed Cereal-based Foods and Baby Foods for Infants and Young Children (Amendment) Regulations (Northern Ireland) 1999 (S.R. 1999 No. 142)
- Food Labelling (Amendment) Regulations (Northern Ireland) 1999 (S.R. 1999 No. 143)
- Income Support (General) (Standard Interest Rate Amendment No. 3) Regulations (Northern Ireland) 1999 (S.R. 1999 No. 144)
- Jobseeker's Allowance (Amendment) Regulations (Northern Ireland) 1999 (S.R. 1999 No. 145)
- Protection from Harassment (1997 Order) (Commencement No. 2) Order (Northern Ireland) 1999 (S.R. 1999 No. 146)
- Fair Employment (Monitoring) Regulations (Northern Ireland) 1999 (S.R. 1999 No. 148)
- Social Security Contributions (Transfer of Functions, etc.) (1999 Order) (Commencement No. 1 and Transitional Provisions) Order (Northern Ireland) 1999 (S.R. 1999 No. 149)
- Health and Safety (Modifications) Regulations (Northern Ireland) 1999 (S.R. 1999 No. 150)
- Social Security (Contributions) (Amendment No. 2) Regulations (Northern Ireland) 1999 (S.R. 1999 No. 151)
- Child Support (Miscellaneous Amendments) Regulations (Northern Ireland) 1999 (S.R. 1999 No. 152)
- Northern Ireland Science Park Foundation Limited (Funding) Order (Northern Ireland) 1999 (S.R. 1999 No. 155)
- Action Programme For Nitrate Vulnerable Zones Regulations (Northern Ireland) 1999 (S.R. 1999 No. 156)
- Specified Risk Material (Amendment) Regulations (Northern Ireland) 1999 (S.R. 1999 No. 157)
- Social Security (New Deal Pilot) (Amendment) Regulations (Northern Ireland) 1999 (S.R. 1999 No. 158)
- Statutory Sick Pay and Statutory Maternity Pay (Decisions) Regulations (Northern Ireland) 1999 (S.R. 1999 No. 159)
- Measuring Equipment (Measures of Length) (Amendment) Regulations (Northern Ireland) 1999 (S.R. 1999 No. 160)
- Social Security Contributions, etc. (Decisions and Appeals - Transitional Modifications) Regulations (Northern Ireland) 1999 (S.R. 1999 No. 161)
- Social Security and Child Support (Decisions and Appeals) Regulations (Northern Ireland) 1999 (S.R. 1999 No. 162)
- Health and Social Services Trusts (Originating Capital Debt) Order (Northern Ireland) 1999 (S.R. 1999 No. 165)
- Charges for Drugs and Appliances and Travelling Expenses and Remission of Charges (Amendment) Regulations (Northern Ireland) 1999 (S.R. 1999 No. 166)
- Child Support (Miscellaneous Amendments No. 2) Regulations (Northern Ireland) 1999 (S.R. 1999 No. 167)
- Social Security (1998 Order) (Commencement No. 5) Order (Northern Ireland) 1999 (S.R. 1999 No. 168)
- Motor Cycles (Protective Headgear) Regulations (Northern Ireland) 1999 (S.R. 1999 No. 170)
- Social Security (Contributions) (Amendment No. 3) Regulations (Northern Ireland) 1999 (S.R. 1999 No. 171)
- Agricultural Wages (1977 Order) (Amendment) Regulations (Northern Ireland) 1999 (S.R. 1999 No. 172)
- Escape and Rescue from Mines Regulations (Northern Ireland) 1999 (S.R. 1999 No. 173)
- Police (1998 Act) (Commencement No. 3) Order (Northern Ireland) 1999 (S.R. 1999 No. 176)
- Foyle Area (Angling) Regulations 1999 (S.R. 1999 No. 182)
- Seed Potatoes (Crop Fees) Regulations (Northern Ireland) 1999 (S.R. 1999 No. 185)
- Electricity (Standards of Performance) (Amendment) Regulations 1999 (S.R. 1999 No. 186)
- Income Support (General) (Standard Interest Rate Amendment No. 4) Regulations (Northern Ireland) 1999 (S.R. 1999 No. 187)
- Pre-School Education in Schools (Admissions Criteria) (Amendment) Regulations (Northern Ireland) 1999 (S.R. 1999 No. 188)
- Miscellaneous Products of Animal Origin (Import Conditions) Regulations (Northern Ireland) 1999 (S.R. 1999 No. 189)
- Local Government (General Grant) Order (Northern Ireland) 1999 (S.R. 1999 No. 190)
- Education (Student Support) Regulations (Northern Ireland) 1999 (S.R. 1999 No. 192)
- Meat Products (Hygiene) (Amendment) Regulations (Northern Ireland) 1999 (S.R. 1999 No. 193)
- Importation of Animals (Amendment) Order (Northern Ireland) 1999 (S.R. 1999 No. 194)
- Disability Discrimination Act 1995 (Commencement No. 6) Order (Northern Ireland) 1999 (S.R. 1999 No. 196)
- Social Security (Incapacity, Earnings and Work Trials) (Pilot Schemes) Regulations (Northern Ireland) 1999 (S.R. 1999 No. 199)
- Legal Advice and Assistance (Amendment No. 2) Regulations (Northern Ireland) 1999 (S.R. 1999 No. 200)

== 201-300 ==
- Commercial Agents (Council Directive) (Amendment) Regulations (Northern Ireland) 1999 (S.R. 1999 No. 201)
- Disability Discrimination (Service and Premises) Regulations (Northern Ireland) 1999 (S.R. 1999 No. 202)
- Diseases of Animals (Modification) Order (Northern Ireland) 1999 (S.R. 1999 No. 204)
- Poultry Feedingstuffs Order (Northern Ireland) 1999 (S.R. 1999 No. 205)
- Social Security Revaluation of Earnings Factors Order (Northern Ireland) 1999 (S.R. 1999 No. 207)
- Countryside Management Regulations (Northern Ireland) 1999 (S.R. 1999 No. 208)
- Potatoes Originating in Egypt (Amendment) Regulations (Northern Ireland) 1999 (S.R. 1999 No. 212)
- Sweeteners in Food (Amendment) Regulations (Northern Ireland) 1999 (S.R. 1999 No. 216)
- Pharmaceutical Society of Northern Ireland (General) (Amendment) Regulations (Northern Ireland) 1999 (S.R. 1999 No. 217)
- Local Government (Superannuation) (Amendment) Regulations (Northern Ireland) 1999 (S.R. 1999 No. 218)
- Social Security (Adjudication) (Amendment) Regulations (Northern Ireland) 1999 (S.R. 1999 No. 220)
- Social Security (Hospital In-Patients, Attendance Allowance and Disability Living Allowance) (Amendment) Regulations (Northern Ireland) 1999 (S.R. 1999 No. 221)
- Education (Assessment Arrangements for Key Stage 3) (Amendment) Order (Northern Ireland) 1999 (S.R. 1999 No. 222)
- Magistrates' Courts (Children (Northern Ireland) Order 1995) (Amendment No. 2) Rules (Northern Ireland) 1999 (S.R. 1999 No. 223)
- Magistrates' Courts (Sex Offender Orders) rules (Northern Ireland) 1999 (S.R. 1999 No. 224)
- Social Security Commissioners (Procedure) Regulations (Northern Ireland) 1999 (S.R. 1999 No. 225)
- Child Support Commissioners (Procedure) Regulations (Northern Ireland) 1999 (S.R. 1999 No. 226)
- Criminal Justice (1996 Order) (Commencement No. 3) Order (Northern Ireland) 1999 (S.R. 1999 No. 230)
- Horse Racing (Charges on Bookmakers) Order (Northern Ireland) 1999 (S.R. 1999 No. 231)
- Social Security (Overlapping Benefits) Amendment No. 2) Regulations (Northern Ireland) 1999 (S.R. 1999 No. 232)
- Legal Aid in Criminal Cases (Statement of Means) Rules (Northern Ireland) 1999 (S.R. 1999 No. 233)
- Motor Vehicle (Type Approval) (Amendment) Regulations (Northern Ireland) 1999 (S.R. 1999 No. 234)
- Motor Vehicles (Construction and Use) (Amendment No. 4) Regulations (Northern Ireland) 1999 (S.R. 1999 No. 235)
- Lands Tribunal (Salaries) Order (Northern Ireland) 1999 (S.R. 1999 No. 236)
- Organic Farming Regulations (Northern Ireland) 1999 (S.R. 1999 No. 237)
- Income Support (General) (Standard Interest Rate Amendment No. 5) Regulations (Northern Ireland) 1999 (S.R. 1999 No. 239)
- Legal Aid in Criminal Cases (Statement of Means) (Amendment) Rules (Northern Ireland) 1999 (S.R. 1999 No. 241)
- Social Security and Child Support (Decisions and Appeals) (Amendment) Regulations (Northern Ireland) 1999 (S.R. 1999 No. 242)
- Miscellaneous Food Additives (Amendment) Regulations (Northern Ireland) 1999 (S.R. 1999 No. 244)
- Education (Individual Pupils' Achievements) (Information) (Amendment) Regulations (Northern Ireland) 1999 (S.R. 1999 No. 245)
- Social Security (1998 Order) (Commencement No. 6 and Consequential and Transitional Provisions) Order (Northern Ireland) 1999 (S.R. 1999 No. 246)
- Social Security (Non-Cash Vouchers Amendments) Regulations (Northern Ireland) 1999 (S.R. 1999 No. 249)
- Electricity Order 1992 (Amendment) Regulations (Northern Ireland) 1999 (S.R. 1999 No. 250)
- Misuse of Drugs (Amendment) Regulations (Northern Ireland) 1999 (S.R. 1999 No. 251)
- Misuse of Drugs (Safe Custody) (Amendment) (Northern Ireland) Regulations 1999 (S.R. 1999 No. 252)
- Pharmaceutical Services (Amendment) Regulations (Northern Ireland) 1999 (S.R. 1999 No. 254)
- Food (Animals and Animal Products from Belgium) (Emergency Control) Order (Northern Ireland) 1999 (S.R. 1999 No. 255)
- Civil Evidence (1997 Order) (Commencement No. 1) Order (Northern Ireland) 1999 (S.R. 1999 No. 256)
- Motor Vehicles (Authorised Weight) Regulations (Northern Ireland) 1999 (S.R. 1999 No. 258)
- Motor Vehicle (Construction and Use) (Amendment No. 5) Regulations (Northern Ireland) 1999 (S.R. 1999 No. 259)
- Legal Aid in Criminal Proceedings (Costs) (Amendment) Rules (Northern Ireland) 1999 (S.R. 1999 No. 260)
- Animal Feedingstuffs from Belgium (Control) Regulations (Northern Ireland) 1999 (S.R. 1999 No. 261)
- Court Funds (Amendment) Rules (Northern Ireland) 1999 (S.R. 1999 No. 262)
- Tuberculosis Control Order (Northern Ireland) 1999 (S.R. 1999 No. 263)
- Tuberculosis (Examination and Testing) Scheme Order (Northern Ireland) 1999 (S.R. 1999 No. 264)
- Cattle Identification (Notification of Births, Deaths and Movements) Regulations (Northern Ireland) 1999 (S.R. 1999 No. 265)
- Social Security and Child Support (Decisions and Appeals) (Amendment No. 2) Regulations (Northern Ireland) 1999 (S.R. 1999 No. 267)
- Curriculum (Programmes of Study and Attainment Target in Home Economics at Key Stages 3 and 4) Order (Northern Ireland) 1999 (S.R. 1999 No. 269)
- Curriculum (Programmes of Study and Attainment Target in Technology and Design at Key Stages 3 and 4) Order (Northern Ireland) 1999 (S.R. 1999 No. 270)
- Social Security Contributions (Transfer of Functions, etc.) (1999 Order) (Commencement No. 2 and Consequential and Transitional Provisions) Order (Northern Ireland) 1999 (S.R. 1999 No. 271)
- Social Security and Child Support (Decisions and Appeals) (Amendment No. 3) Regulations (Northern Ireland) 1999 (S.R. 1999 No. 272)
- Salaries (Assembly Ombudsman and Commissioner for Complaints) Order (Northern Ireland) 1999 (S.R. 1999 No. 274)
- Social Security (Educational Maintenance allowance Amendment) Regulations (Northern Ireland) 1999 (S.R. 1999 No. 275)
- General Medical Services (Amendment) regulations (Northern Ireland) 1999 (S.R. 1999 No. 276)
- Unfair Dismissal and Statement of Reasons for Dismissal (Variation of Qualifying Period) Order (Northern Ireland) 1999 (S.R. 1999 No. 277)
- New Deal Pilot for 25 Plus (Miscellaneous Provisions) Order (Northern Ireland) 1999 (S.R. 1999 No. 278)
- Motor Vehicles (Construction and Use) (Amendment No. 6) Regulations (Northern Ireland) 1999 (S.R. 1999 No. 279)
- Plant Protection Products (Amendment) (No. 2) Regulations (Northern Ireland) 1999 (S.R. 1999 No. 282)
- Food Safety (General Food Hygiene) (Amendment) Regulations (Northern Ireland) 1999 (S.R. 1999 No. 284)
- Food Safety (Fishery Products and Live Shellfish) (Hygiene) (Amendment No. 2) Regulations (Northern Ireland) 1999 (S.R. 1999 No. 285)
- Food Labelling (Amendment No. 2) Regulations (Northern Ireland) 1999 (S.R. 1999 No. 286)
- Feeding Stuffs (Amendment) Regulations (Northern Ireland) 1999 (S.R. 1999 No. 287)
- Smoke Control Areas (Authorised Fuels) Regulations (Northern Ireland) 1999 (S.R. 1999 No. 288)
- Smoke Control Areas (Exempted Fireplaces) Regulations (Northern Ireland) 1999 (S.R. 1999 No. 289)
- Health and Personal Social Services (Superannuation) (Amendment) Regulations (Northern Ireland) 1999 (S.R. 1999 No. 293)
- Health and Personal Social Services (Superannuation) (Additional Voluntary Contributions) Regulations (Northern Ireland) 1999 (S.R. 1999 No. 294)
- Company Drivers' Hours and Recording Equipment (Exemptions and Supplementary Provisions) (Amendment) Regulations (Northern Ireland) 1999 (S.R. 1999 No. 295)
- Feeding Stuffs (Sampling and Analysis) Regulations (Northern Ireland) 1999 (S.R. 1999 No. 296)
- Motorways Traffic (Amendment) Regulations (Northern Ireland) 1999 (S.R. 1999 No. 297)
- Housing Benefit (General) (Amendment) Regulations (Northern Ireland) 1999 (S.R. 1999 No. 298)
- Food (Animals and Animal Products from Belgium) (Emergency Control) (Amendment) Order (Northern Ireland) 1999 (S.R. 1999 No. 299)
- Food (Peanuts from Egypt) (Emergency Control) Order (Northern Ireland) 1999 (S.R. 1999 No. 300)

== 301-400 ==
- Natural Mineral Water, Spring Water and Bottled Drinking Water Regulations (Northern Ireland) 1999 (S.R. 1999 No. 301)
- Contaminants in Food (Amendment) Regulations (Northern Ireland) 1999 (S.R. 1999 No. 302)
- Chemicals (Hazard Information and Packaging for Supply) (Amendment) Regulations (Northern Ireland) 1999 (S.R. 1999 No. 303)
- Lifting Operations and Lifting Equipment Regulations (Northern Ireland) 1999 (S.R. 1999 No. 304)
- Provision and Use of Work Equipment Regulations (Northern Ireland) 1999 (S.R. 1999 No. 305)
- Race Relations Code of Practice (Elimination of Discrimination in Employment) (Appointed Day) Order (Northern Ireland) 1999 (S.R. 1999 No. 306)
- Animal Feedingstuffs from Belgium (Control) (Amendment) Regulations (Northern Ireland) 1999 (S.R. 1999 No. 307)
- Bovines and Bovine Products (Trade) Regulations (Northern Ireland) 1999 (S.R. 1999 No. 308)
- Occupational Pension Schemes (Investment, and Assignment, Forfeiture, Bankruptcy etc.) (Amendment) Regulations (Northern Ireland) 1999 (S.R. 1999 No. 309)
- Social Security (1998 Order) (Commencement No. 7 and Savings, Consequential and Transitional Provisions) Order (Northern Ireland) 1999 (S.R. 1999 No. 310)
- Sex Discrimination (Gender Reassignment) Regulations (Northern Ireland) 1999 (S.R. 1999 No. 311)
- Social Fund Winter Fuel Payment (Amendment) Regulations (Northern Ireland) 1999 (S.R. 1999 No. 312)
- Industrial Training Levy (Construction Industry) Order (Northern Ireland) 1999 (S.R. 1999 No. 314)
- Income Support (General) and Jobseeker's Allowance (Amendment) Regulations (Northern Ireland) 1999 (S.R. 1999 No. 315)
- Social Security (Students Amendments) Regulations (Northern Ireland) 1999 (S.R. 1999 No. 317)
- Pesticides (Maximum Residue Levels in Crops, Food and Feeding Stuffs) (National Limits) (Amendment) Regulations (Northern Ireland) 1999 (S.R. 1999 No. 320)
- Pesticides (Maximum Residue Levels in Crops, Food and Feeding Stuffs) (EEC Limits) (Amendment No. 2) Regulations (Northern Ireland) 1999 (S.R. 1999 No. 321)
- Bovine Spongiform Encephalopathy Order (Northern Ireland) 1999 (S.R. 1999 No. 322)
- Bovine Spongiform Encephalopathy (Feedingstuffs and Surveillance) Regulations (Northern Ireland) 1999 (S.R. 1999 No. 323)
- Cattle Passport Regulations (Northern Ireland) 1999 (S.R. 1999 No. 324)
- Waste and Contaminated Land (1997 Order) (Commencement No. 3) Order (Northern Ireland) 1999 (S.R. 1999 No. 325)
- Welfare of Animals (Staging Points) Regulations (Northern Ireland) 1999 (S.R. 1999 No. 326)
- Disability Discrimination Code of Practice (Goods, Facilities, Services and Premises) Order (Northern Ireland) 1999 (S.R. 1999 No. 327)
- Game Birds Preservation Order (Northern Ireland) 1999 (S.R. 1999 No. 328)
- Electricity (Standards of Performance) (Amendment No. 2) Regulations (Northern Ireland) 1999 (S.R. 1999 No. 331)
- Rules of the Supreme Court (Northern Ireland) (Amendment No. 2) 1999 (S.R. 1999 No. 333)
- County Court (Amendment No. 2) Rules (Northern Ireland) 1999 (S.R. 1999 No. 334)
- Food (Animals and Animal Products from Belgium) (Emergency Control) (No. 2) Order (Northern Ireland) 1999 (S.R. 1999 No. 335)
- Animal Feedingstuffs from Belgium (Control) (No. 2) Regulations (Northern Ireland) 1999 (S.R. 1999 No. 336)
- Education (1998 Order) (Commencement No. 2) Order (Northern Ireland) 1999 (S.R. 1999 No. 337)
- Planning Applications (Exemption from Publication) Order (Northern Ireland) 1999 (S.R. 1999 No. 338)
- Civil Evidence (1997 Order) (Commencement No. 2) Order (Northern Ireland) 1999 (S.R. 1999 No. 339)
- Social Security (Sports Awards Amendments) Regulations (Northern Ireland) 1999 (S.R. 1999 No. 342)
- Education (Student Loans) (Amendment) Regulations (Northern Ireland) 1999 (S.R. 1999 No. 343)
- Social Security (Incapacity Benefit and Jobseeker's Allowance) (Amendment) Regulations (Northern Ireland) 1999 (S.R. 1999 No. 346)
- Child Benefit (Great Britain Reciprocal Arrangements) (Amendment) Regulations (Northern Ireland) 1999 (S.R. 1999 No. 349)
- Social Security (Great Britain Reciprocal Arrangements) (Amendment) Regulations (Northern Ireland) 1999 (S.R. 1999 No. 350)
- Students Awards Regulations (Northern Ireland) 1999 (S.R. 1999 No. 351)
- Electricity (Class Exemptions from the Requirement for a Licence) Order (Northern Ireland) 1999 (S.R. 1999 No. 352)
- Local Government (Defined Activities) (Exemptions) Order (Northern Ireland) 1999 (S.R. 1999 No. 353)
- Road Traffic (Fixed Penalty) (Offences) (Amendment) Order (Northern Ireland) 1999 (S.R. 1999 No. 354)
- Fair Employment and Treatment (1998 Order) (Commencement No. 2) Order (Northern Ireland) 1999 (S.R. 1999 No. 355)
- Food (Animals and Animal Products from Belgium) (Emergency Control) (No. 3) Order (Northern Ireland) 1999 (S.R. 1999 No. 357)
- Motor Vehicles (Driving Licences) (Amendment No. 2) Regulations (Northern Ireland) 1999 (S.R. 1999 No. 358)
- Animal Feedingstuffs from Belgium (Control) (No. 3) Regulations (Northern Ireland) 1999 (S.R. 1999 No. 360)
- Controlled Waste (Registration of Carriers and Seizure of Vehicles) Regulations (Northern Ireland) 1999 (S.R. 1999 No. 362)
- Salaries (Comptroller and Auditor General) Order (Northern Ireland) 1999 (S.R. 1999 No. 364)
- Social Security (Claims and Payments) (Amendment) Regulations (Northern Ireland) 1999 (S.R. 1999 No. 365)
- Electricity (Standards of Performance) (Amendment No. 3) Regulations (Northern Ireland) 1999 (S.R. 1999 No. 366)
- Food Protection (Emergency Prohibitions) Order (Northern Ireland) 1999 (S.R. 1999 No. 368)
- Students Awards (Amendment) Regulations (Northern Ireland) 1999 (S.R. 1999 No. 369)
- Education (Student Support) (Amendment) Regulations (Northern Ireland) 1999 (S.R. 1999 No. 370)
- Social Security (1998 Order) (Commencement No. 8 and Savings, Consequential and Transitional Provisions) Order (Northern Ireland) 1999 (S.R. 1999 No. 371)
- Housing Benefit (General) (Amendment No. 2) Regulations (Northern Ireland) 1999 (S.R. 1999 No. 372)
- Waste and Contaminated Land (1997 Order) (Commencement No. 4) Order (Northern Ireland) 1999 (S.R. 1999 No. 373)
- Occupational Pension Schemes (Preservation of Benefit) (Amendment) Regulations (Northern Ireland) 1999 (S.R. 1999 No. 378)
- Seeds (Fees) Regulations (Northern Ireland) 1999 (S.R. 1999 No. 379)
- Welfare of Animals (Transport) (Amendment) Order (Northern Ireland) 1999 (S.R. 1999 No. 380)
- Social Security (Miscellaneous Amendments No. 2) Regulations (Northern Ireland) 1999 (S.R. 1999 No. 381)
- Social Security (Personal Allowances for Children and Young Persons Amendment) Regulations (Northern Ireland) 1999 (S.R. 1999 No. 382)
- Spreadable Fats (Marketing Standards) Regulations (Northern Ireland) 1999 (S.R. 1999 No. 383)
- Registration of Clubs (Accounts) (Amendment) Regulations (Northern Ireland) 1999 (S.R. 1999 No. 384)
- Social Security and Child Support (Tax Credits Consequential Amendments) Regulations (Northern Ireland) 1999 (S.R. 1999 No. 385)
- Food Protection (Emergency Prohibitions) (Strangford Lough) Order (Northern Ireland) 1999 (S.R. 1999 No. 386)
- Housing Renovation etc. Grants (Reduction of Grant) (Amendment) Regulations (Northern Ireland) 1999 (S.R. 1999 No. 387)
- Plant Health (Wood and Bark) (Amendment) Order (Northern Ireland) 1999 (S.R. 1999 No. 389)
- Income Support (General) (Amendment) Regulations (Northern Ireland) 1999 (S.R. 1999 No. 390)
- Social Security (Notional Income and Capital Amendment) Regulations (Northern Ireland) 1999 (S.R. 1999 No. 391)
- Explosives (Fireworks) Regulations (Northern Ireland) 1999 (S.R. 1999 No. 392)
- Optical Charges and Payments and General Ophthalmic Services (Amendment) Regulations (Northern Ireland) 1999 (S.R. 1999 No. 394)
- Travelling Expenses and Remission of Charges (Amendment) Regulations (Northern Ireland) 1999 (S.R. 1999 No. 395)
- Welfare Foods (Amendment) Regulations (Northern Ireland) 1999 (S.R. 1999 No. 397)
- Public Interest Disclosure (1998 Order) (Commencement) Order (Northern Ireland) 1999 (S.R. 1999 No. 400)

== 401-500 ==
- Public Interest Disclosure (Prescribed Persons) Order (Northern Ireland) 1999 (S.R. 1999 No. 401)
- Public Interest Disclosure (Compensation) Regulations (Northern Ireland) 1999 (S.R. 1999 No. 402)
- Food Protection (Emergency Prohibitions) (No. 2) Order (Northern Ireland) 1999 (S.R. 1999 No. 403)
- Disability Discrimination Code of Practice (Duties of Trade Organisations to their Disabled Members and Applicants) (Appointed Day) Order (Northern Ireland) 1999 (S.R. 1999 No. 404)
- Pharmaceutical Services (Amendment No. 2) Regulations (Northern Ireland) 1999 (S.R. 1999 No. 405)
- Social Security (1998 Order) (Commencement No. 9 and Transitional Provisions) Order (Northern Ireland) 1999 (S.R. 1999 No. 407)
- Social Security and Child Support (Decisions and Appeals) and Jobseeker's Allowance (Amendment) Regulations (Northern Ireland) 1999 (S.R. 1999 No. 408)
- Redundancy Payments (Continuity of Employment in Local Government, etc.) (Modification) Order (Northern Ireland) 1999 (S.R. 1999 No. 409)
- Road Traffic (Traffic Wardens) Order (Northern Ireland) 1999 (S.R. 1999 No. 410)
- Royal Ulster Constabulary Reserve (Full-time) (Appointment and Conditions of Service) (Amendment) Regulations 1999 (S.R. 1999 No. 411)
- Royal Ulster Constabulary (Amendment) Regulations 1999 (S.R. 1999 No. 412)
- Health and Social Services Trusts (Originating Capital Debt) (Amendment) Order (Northern Ireland) 1999 (S.R. 1999 No. 414)
- Environmental Impact Assessment (Fish Farming in Marine Waters) Regulations (Northern Ireland) 1999 (S.R. 1999 No. 415)
- Housing Benefit (General) (Amendment No. 3) Regulations (Northern Ireland) 1999 (S.R. 1999 No. 416)
- Animal By-Products (Identification) Regulations (Northern Ireland) 1999 (S.R. 1999 No. 418)
- Pre-School Education in Schools (Admissions Criteria) Regulations (Northern Ireland) 1999 (S.R. 1999 No. 419)
- Food (Animals and Animal Products from Belgium) (Emergency Control) (No. 4) Order (Northern Ireland) 1999 (S.R. 1999 No. 420)
- Animal Feedingstuffs from Belgium (Control) (No. 4) Regulations (Northern Ireland) 1999 (S.R. 1999 No. 422)
- Mussels (Prohibition of Fishing) Regulations (Northern Ireland) 1999 (S.R. 1999 No. 423)
- Change of District Name (Dungannon) Order (Northern Ireland) 1999 (S.R. 1999 No. 426)
- Social Security (1998 Order) (Commencement No. 10 and Savings, Consequential and Transitional Provisions) Order (Northern Ireland) 1999 (S.R. 1999 No. 428)
- Specified Risk Material (Inspection Charges) Regulations (Northern Ireland) 1999 (S.R. 1999 No. 431)
- Collective Redundancies and Transfer of Undertakings (Protection of Employment) (Amendment) Regulations (Northern Ireland) 1999 (S.R. 1999 No. 432)
- Importation of Animal Pathogens Order (Northern Ireland) 1999 (S.R. 1999 No. 433)
- Specified Animal Pathogens Order (Northern Ireland) 1999 (S.R. 1999 No. 434)
- Road Traffic Offenders (Additional Offences and Prescribed Devices) Order (Northern Ireland) 1999 (S.R. 1999 No. 435)
- Superannuation (Secretary to The Mental Health Commission) Order (Northern Ireland) 1999 (S.R. 1999 No. 438)
- Education (1998 Order) (Commencement No. 3) Order (Northern Ireland) 1999 (S.R. 1999 No. 439)
- Disability Discrimination (Description of Insurance Services) Regulations (Northern Ireland) 1999 (S.R. 1999 No. 440)
- Health Services (Choice of Dental Practitioner) (Amendment) Regulations (Northern Ireland) 1999 (S.R. 1999 No. 441)
- Employer's Liability (Compulsory Insurance) Regulations (Northern Ireland) 1999 (S.R. 1999 No. 448)
- Local Government (Payments to Councillors) Regulations (Northern Ireland) 1999 (S.R. 1999 No. 449)
- Fair Employment (Specification of Public Authorities) (Amendment) Order (Northern Ireland) 1999 (S.R. 1999 No. 451)
- Fair Employment Tribunal (Rules of Procedure) (Amendment) Regulations (Northern Ireland) 1999 (S.R. 1999 No. 452)
- Motor Vehicles (Construction and Use) Regulations (Northern Ireland) 1999 (S.R. 1999 No. 454)
- Compulsory Registration of Title Order (Northern Ireland) 1999 (S.R. 1999 No. 455)
- Sheep Annual Premium (Amendment) Regulations (Northern Ireland) 1999 (S.R. 1999 No. 457)
- Property (1997 Order) (Commencement No. 2) Order (Northern Ireland) 1999 (S.R. 1999 No. 461)
- Fair Employment and Treatment (Questions and Replies) Regulations (Northern Ireland) 1999 (S.R. 1999 No. 463)
- County Court (Amendment No. 3) Rules (Northern Ireland) 1999 (S.R. 1999 No. 464)
- Jobseeker's Allowance (New Deal Amendment) Regulations (Northern Ireland) 1999 (S.R. 1999 No. 467)
- Jobseeker's Allowance (Amendment No. 2) Regulations (Northern Ireland) 1999 (S.R. 1999 No. 468)
- Occupational Pensions (Revaluation) Order (Northern Ireland) 1999 (S.R. 1999 No. 469)
- Employment Relations (1999 Order) (Commencement No. 1 and Transitional and Saving Provisions) Order (Northern Ireland) 1999 (S.R. 1999 No. 470)
- Maternity and Parental Leave etc. Regulations (Northern Ireland) 1999 (S.R. 1999 No. 471)
- Social Security (1998 Order) (Commencement No. 11 and Consequential and Transitional Provisions) Order (Northern Ireland) 1999 (S.R. 1999 No. 472)
- Social Security and Child Support (Decisions and Appeals) (Amendment No. 4) Regulations (Northern Ireland) 1999 (S.R. 1999 No. 473)
- Social Security (New Deal Pilot) Regulations (Northern Ireland) 1999 (S.R. 1999 No. 474)
- Motor Vehicles (Invalid Carriages) Regulations (Northern Ireland) 1999 (S.R. 1999 No. 478)
- Vehicles (Class 1 Invalid Carriages) Regulations (Northern Ireland) 1999 (S.R. 1999 No. 479)
- Departments (1999 Order) (Commencement) Order (Northern Ireland) 1999 (S.R. 1999 No. 480)
- Departments (Transfer and Assignment of Functions) Order (Northern Ireland) 1999 (S.R. 1999 No. 481)
- Foyle Area (Close Season) Regulations 1999 (S.R. 1999 No. 482)
- Foyle Area (Control of Fishing) Regulations 1999 (S.R. 1999 No. 483)
- Traffic Signs (Amendment) Regulations (Northern Ireland) 1999 (S.R. 1999 No. 484)
- Foyle Area (Licensing of Fishing Engines) (Amendment No. 2) Regulations 1999 (S.R. 1999 No. 485)
- Personal and Occupational Pension Schemes (Miscellaneous Amendments) Regulations (Northern Ireland) 1999 (S.R. 1999 No. 486)
- Eel Fishing (Licence Duties) Regulations (Northern Ireland) 1999 (S.R. 1999 No. 487)
- Fisheries (Amendment No. 2) Byelaws (Northern Ireland) 1999 (S.R. 1999 No. 488)
- Magistrates' Courts (Devolution Issues) Rules (Northern Ireland) 1999 (S.R. 1999 No. 489)
- County Court (Amendment No. 4) Rules (Northern Ireland) 1999 (S.R. 1999 No. 490)
- Crown Court (Amendment No. 2) Rules (Northern Ireland) 1999 (S.R. 1999 No. 491)
- Criminal Appeal (Devolution Issues) Rules (Northern Ireland) 1999 (S.R. 1999 No. 492)
- Rules of the Supreme Court (Northern Ireland) (Amendment No. 3) 1999 (S.R. 1999 No. 493)
- Welfare Reform and Pensions (1999 Order) (Commencement No. 1) Order (Northern Ireland) 1999 (S.R. 1999 No. 494)
- Beef Bones (Amendment) Regulations (Northern Ireland) 1999 (S.R. 1999 No. 495)
- Producer Responsibility Obligations (Packaging Waste) (Amendment) Regulations (Northern Ireland) 1999 (S.R. 1999 No. 496)
- Hill Livestock (Compensatory Allowances) Regulations (Northern Ireland) 1999 (S.R. 1999 No. 497)
- Countryside Access (Amendment) Regulations (Northern Ireland) 1999 (S.R. 1999 No. 498)
- Social Fund (Maternity and Funeral Expenses) (General) (Amendment) Regulations (Northern Ireland) 1999 (S.R. 1999 No. 499)
- Income Support (General) (Amendment No. 2) Regulations (Northern Ireland) 1999 (S.R. 1999 No. 500)

== 501-600 ==
- Income Support (General) and Jobseeker's Allowance (Amendment No. 2) Regulations (Northern Ireland) 1999 (S.R. 1999 No. 501)
- Marketing of Ornamental Plant Propagating Material Regulations (Northern Ireland) 1999 (S.R. 1999 No. 502)
