= Martin Automatic =

Martin Automatic, Inc.
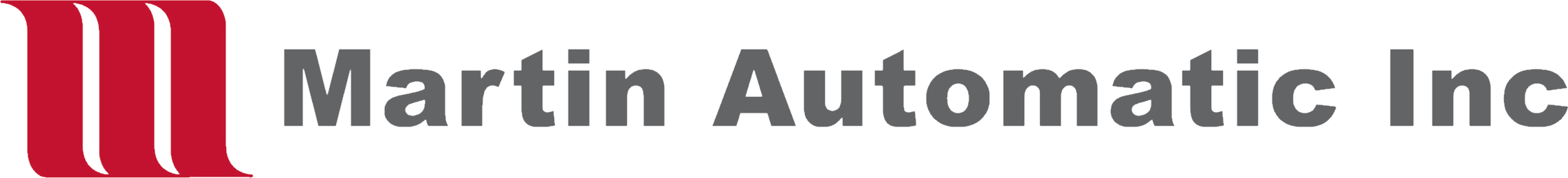
- Type: Private
- Industry: Manufacturing
- Founded: 1968; 58 years ago
- Founder: John Martin
- Headquarters: Rockford, Illinois, United States
- Area served: Worldwide
- Key people: Jordan Martin; Jon Bauch; Gavin Rittmeyer
- Number of employees: ~160 (2025)
- Website: www.martinautomatic.com

Martin Automatic, Inc. is a manufacturer of web-handling equipment with headquarters in Rockford, Illinois. They specialize in automatic splicing unwinds, rewinds, splicing, tension control systems, and web-guiding systems for the printing, packaging, and converting industries.

== History ==
Martin Automatic was founded in 1968 by John Martin, an inventor and entrepreneur. The company occupies a 170,000 square foot manufacturing facility near the Rock River with a 1.2-megawat solar panel system, making it one of the largest solar installations in northern Illinois. The company was awarded the Dale Sabers Safety Award in 2020.

As of 2025, they employ around 160 people and work with Rock Valley College to provide internships and employment. They operate globally with customers in 54 countries.

== Products and technology ==
Martin Automatic designs and manufactures web-handling equipment including automatic splicing unwinds, automatic transfer rewinds, and tension control systems. The company holds multiple patents for creations, including inertia compensation technology and idler rollers designed for high-speed, low-tension processes.

They also produce equipment for paperboard products such as folding cartons, beverage carriers, and disposable cups and plates; roofing, industrial and construction goods; medical and diagnostic products; and specialty converting and manufacturing.

== See also ==
- Winding machine
- Web-guiding systems
- Mechanical splice
