= Rotogravure =

Printing process

Diagram of rotogravure process

Rotogravure (or gravure for short) is a type of intaglio printing process, which involves engraving the image onto an image carrier. In gravure printing, the image is engraved onto a cylinder because, like offset printing and flexography, it uses a rotary printing press.

Once a staple of newspaper photo features, the rotogravure process is still used for commercial printing of magazines, postcards, and corrugated (cardboard) and other product packaging.

== History and development ==
In the 19th century, a number of developments in photography allowed the production of photo-mechanical printing plates. Henry Fox Talbot mentions in 1852 the use of a textile in the photographic process to create half-tones in the printing plate. A French patent in 1860 describes a reel-fed gravure press. A collaboration between Karel Klič and Samuel Fawcett in 1895 in Lancaster resulted in the founding of the Rembrandt Intaglio Printing Company, which produced art prints. In 1906 they marketed the first multi-colour gravure print.

In 1912 Messrs Bruckman in Munich produced proofs for Bavarian postage stamps which went into production in 1914. Also in 1912 newspaper supplements printed by reel-fed gravure were on sale in London and Berlin (The Illustrated London News and Der Weltspiegel).

Irving Berlin's song "Easter Parade" specifically refers to this type of supplement in the lines "the photographers will snap us, and you'll find that you're in the rotogravure". And the song "Hooray for Hollywood" contains the line "... armed with photos from local rotos" referring to young actresses hoping to make it in the movie industry. In 1976, ex-Beatle Ringo Starr released an album titled Ringo's Rotogravure.

Gravure is one of several printing techniques being actively used in the field of printed electronics.

== Process and components ==
In direct gravure printing, the ink is applied directly to the cylinder and from the cylinder it is transferred to the substrate. One printing unit consists of the following components:

- an engraved cylinder (also known as "gravure cylinder") whose circumference can differ according to the layout of the product being made.
- an ink fountain
- a doctor blade assembly
- an impression roller
- a dryer

For indirect gravure processes, the engraved cylinder transfers ink in the desired areas to a transfer roller, and the transfer roller transfers it to the substrate.

=== Engraved cylinder ===
The first step of Gravure is to create the cylinder with the engraved images that need to be printed: the engraving process will create on the cylinder surface the cells that will contain the ink in order to transfer it to the paper. Since the amount of ink contained in the cells corresponds to different colour intensities on the paper, the dimensions of the cells must be carefully set: deeper or larger cells will produce more intense colours whereas smaller cells will produce less intense ones. There are three methods of photoengraving that have been used for engraving of gravure cylinders, where the cell open size or the depth of cells can be uniform or variable:

Method	cell size	cell depth
Conventional	uniform	variable
"Two positive" or "Lateral hard dot"	variable	variable
Direct transfer	variable	uniform

Gravure cylinders are usually made of steel and plated with copper, though other materials, e.g. ceramics can also be used. The desired pattern is achieved by engraving with a laser or a diamond tool, or by chemical etching. If the cylinder is chemically etched, a resist (in the form of a negative image) is transferred to the cylinder before etching. The resist protects the non-image areas of the cylinder from the etchant. After etching, the resist is stripped off. The operation is analogous to the manufacture of printed circuit boards. Following engraving, the cylinder is proofed and tested, reworked if necessary, and then chrome plated.

=== Process ===
While the press is in operation, the engraved cylinder is partially immersed in the ink tray, filling the recessed cells. As the cylinder rotates, it draws excess ink onto its surface and into the cells. Acting as a squeegee, the doctor blade scrapes the cylinder before it makes contact with the paper, removing the excess ink from the non-printing (non-recessed) areas and leaving in the cells the right amount of ink required. The position of the blade relative to the nip is normally variable.

Next, the substrate gets sandwiched between the impression roller and the gravure cylinder: this is where the ink gets transferred from the recessed cells to the web. The purpose of the impression roller is to apply force, ensuring that the entire substrate is brought into contact with the gravure cylinder, which in turn ensures even and maximum coverage of the ink. Once in contact with the substrate, the ink's surface tension pulls (part of) the ink out of the cell and transfers it to the substrate.

Then the inked substrate goes through a dryer because it must be completely dry before going through the next color unit and accepting another coat of ink. A rotogravure printing press has one printing unit for each color, typically CMYK or cyan, magenta, yellow and key (printing terminology for black), but the number of units varies depending on what colors are required to produce the final image.

== Features ==
Because gravure is capable of transferring more ink to the paper than most other printing processes, it is noted for its remarkable density range (light to shadow) and hence is a process of choice for fine art and photography reproduction, though not typically as clean an image as that of offset lithography. A shortcoming of gravure is that all images, including type and "solids," are actually printed as dots, and unless the ink and substrate combination is set up to allow solid areas to flow together, the screen pattern of these dots can be visible to the naked eye.

Gravure is an industrial printing process capable of consistent high quality printing. Since the Gravure printing process requires the creation of one cylinder for each colour of the final image, it is expensive for short runs and best suited for high volume printing. Typical uses include long-run magazines in excess of 1 million copies, mail order catalogs, consumer packaging, Sunday newspaper ad inserts, wallpaper and laminates for furniture where quality and consistency are desired. Another application area of gravure printing is in the flexible-packaging sector. A wide range of substrates such as polyethylene, polypropylene, polyester, BOPP, etc. can be printed in the gravure press. Gravure printing is one of the common processes used in the converting industry. High initial setup costs and extended lead times contributed to rotogravure's general failure in the publication printing sector, yet the method remains dominant for flexible packaging in Asia (where it holds an estimated 80% market share) and maintains a strong presence in Europe, in contrast to its stagnation in the Americas.

Rotogravure presses for publication run at 45 feet (14 m) per second and more, with paper reel widths of over 10 feet (3 m), enabling an eight-unit press to print about seven million four-color pages per hour.

The vast majority of gravure presses print on rolls (also known as webs) of paper or other substrates, rather than sheets. (Sheetfed gravure is a small, specialty market.) Rotary gravure presses are the fastest and widest presses in operation, printing everything from narrow labels to 12-foot-wide (3.66-meter-wide) rolls of vinyl flooring. For maximum efficiency, gravure presses operate at high speeds producing large diameter, wide rolls. These are then cut or slit down to the finished roll size on a slitting machine or slitter rewinder. Additional operations may be in line with a gravure press, such as saddle stitching facilities for magazine or brochure work.

=== Advantages ===
Although the rotogravure printing process is not the most popular printing process used in flexible-packaging manufacturing, it does have the ability to print on thin film such as polyester, polypropylene, nylon, and polyethylene, which come in a wide range of thicknesses, commonly 10 to 30 micrometers.

Other appreciated features include:

- printing cylinders that can last through large-volume runs without the image degrading
- good quality image reproduction
- low per-unit costs running high volume production

=== Disadvantages ===
Shortcomings of the gravure printing process include:

- high start-up costs: hundreds of thousands of copies needed to make it profitable
- rasterized lines and texts
- long lead time for cylinder preparation, which is offsite as the techniques used are so specialized
- rotogravure cylinder manufacturing utilizes hexavalent chromium electroplating. OSHA states that "all hexavalent chromium compounds are considered carcinogenic to workers."

== See also ==
- Flexography
- Offset printing
- Photogravure
- Roll slitting
- Rotary printing press
