= Winding machine =

Machine for winding yarn etc onto a spool

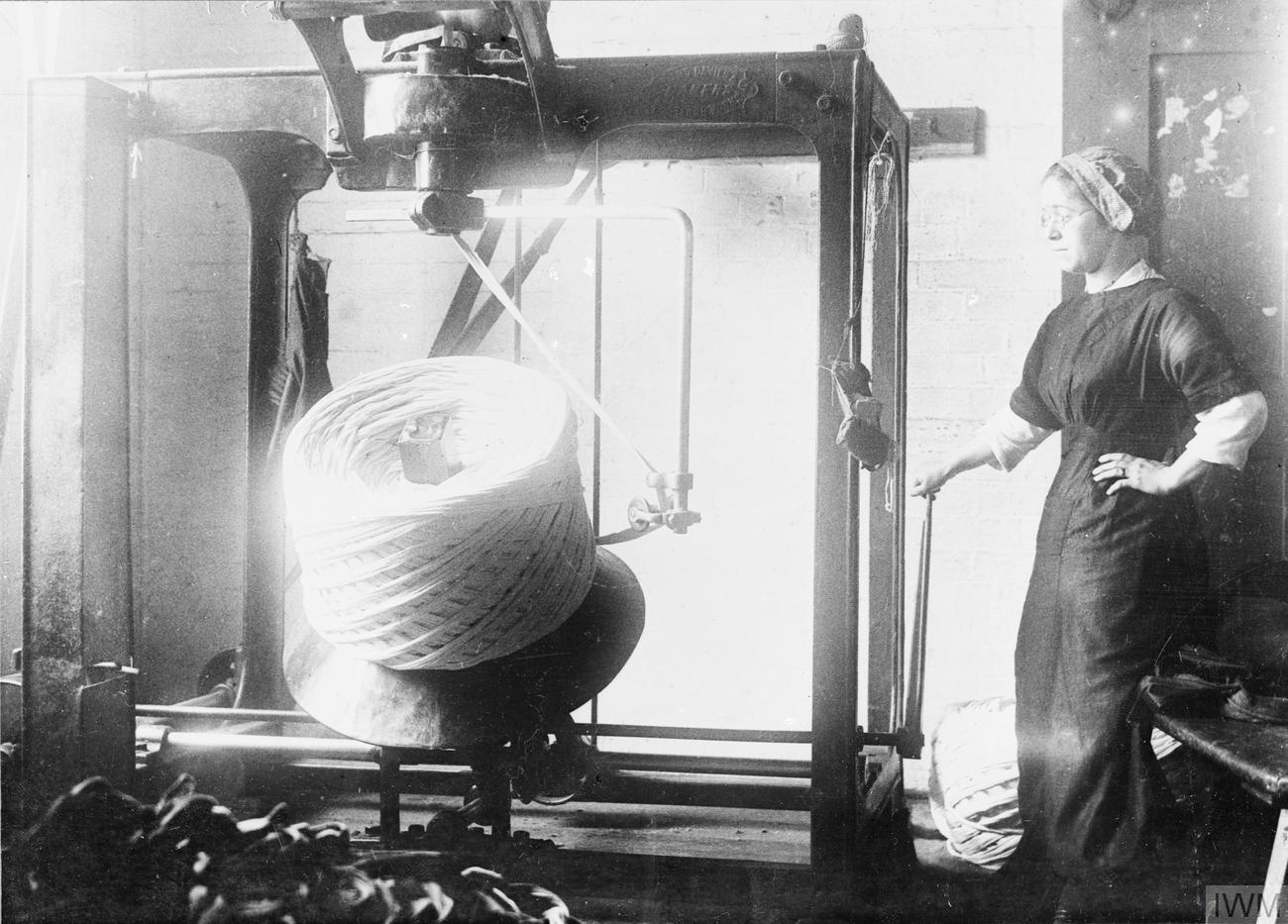
A British textile worker producing a ball of warp, 1918

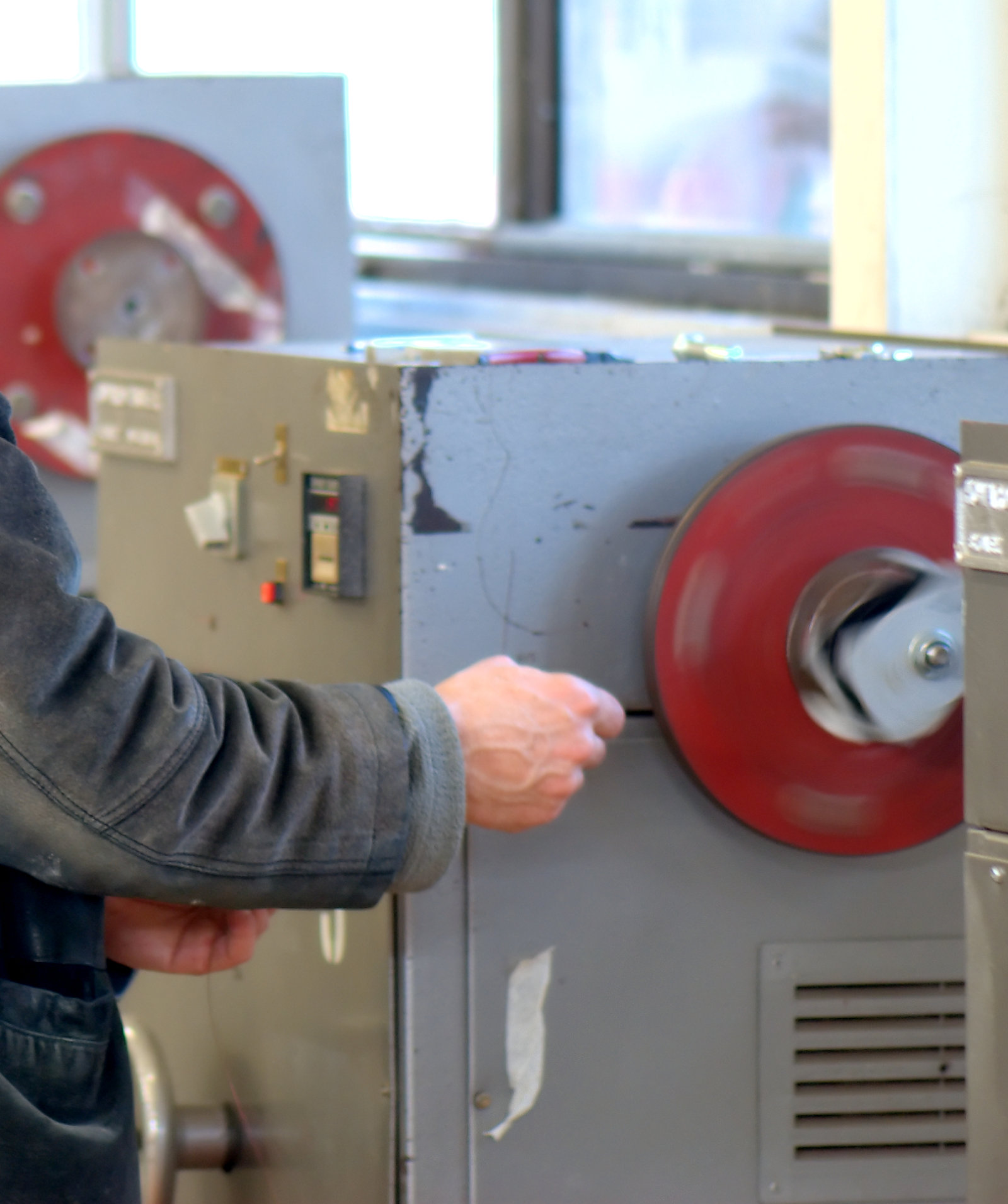
A winder being used in the construction of a transformer, at a technical college workshop

A winding machine or winder is a machine for wrapping string, twine, cord, thread, yarn, rope, wire, ribbon, tape, etc. onto a spool, bobbin, reel, etc.

== In textiles ==
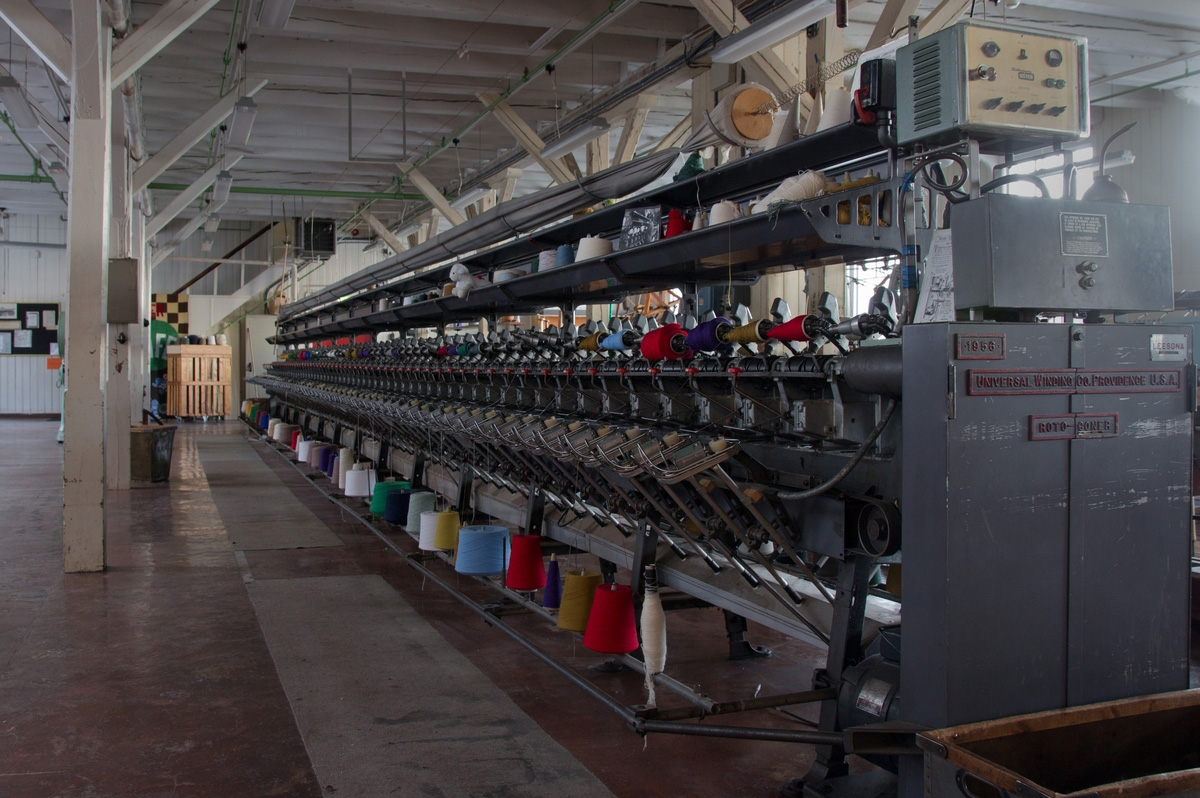
Yarn winding machine from 1956 used at the knitwear factory Salhus Tricotagefabrik in Bergen, Norway (NTMT.00111)

Winders are used heavily in textile manufacturing, especially in preparation to weaving where the yarn is wound onto a bobbin and then used in a shuttle. Ball winders, such as the Scottish Liaghra, are another type of winder that wind the yarn up from skein form into balls. Ball winders are commonly used by knitters and occasionally spinners.

== Mechanized winders ==
Winders have a center roll (a bobbin, spool, reel, belt-winding shell, etc.) on which the material is wound up. Often there are metal bars that travel through the center of the roll and are shaped according to their intended purpose. A circular bar facilitates greater speed, while a square bar provides a greater potential for torque. Edge sensors are used to sense how full the center roll is. They are mounted on adjustable slides to accommodate many different widths, as the width increases as the center roll is filled. The sensitivity of the sensor depends on the required speed of operation.

== Types of winding machine ==
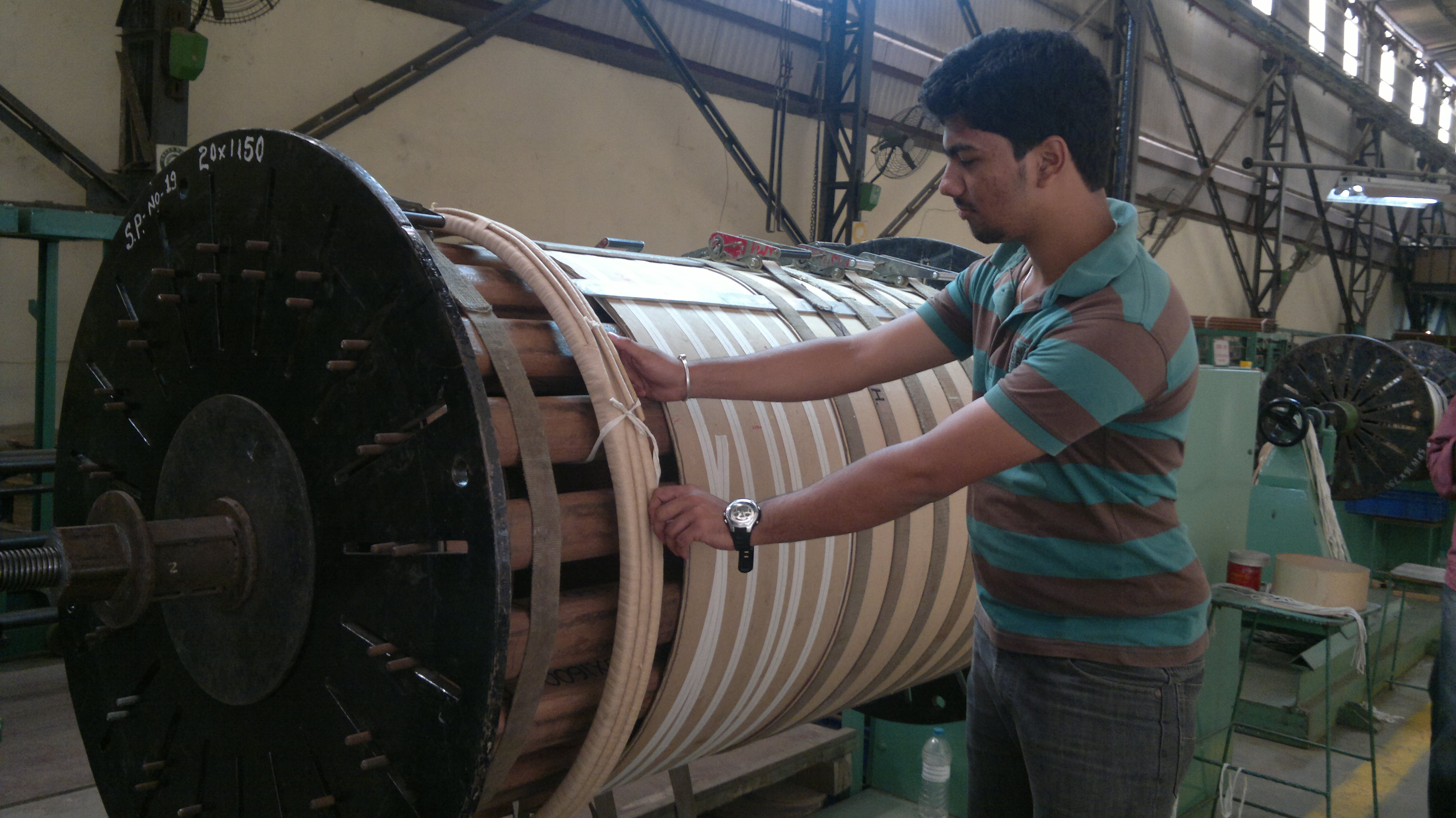
An engineer inspecting the winding machine.

Winding machines are classified based on the materials they are winding, some major types are

- Coil winding machine
- Film winding machine
- Rope winding machine
- Paper winding machine
- Foil winding machine
- Roll slitting machines
- spool winding machine
- cop winding machine

On the basis of working the winders are classified as follows

- Shaft or shaft-less winding machine
- Cantilevered turret winding machine
- Carriage style winding machine

== Available features ==
=== Automatic splice initiation ===
The benefits of automatic splicing add up to significantly increased productivity, greater quality control and reduced waste. It consists of a tail grabber and automatic diameter calculated splice initiation technique. The precision shear wheel and anvil mechanism guarantee a clean cut and no overlap. The splicing technique is divided into two major categories based on the type of joint, they are, Butt splicing where adhesives are used and Lap splicing: lap joint by means of applying heat and pressing it.

=== Web break detection ===
Some winders have sensors built in to monitor the web (thread, wire, etc. that is being wound). There are three common types of sensors:

- Fiber optic IR measurement sensors
- Contact optic sensors
- Non-contact optic sensors
- Diameter roll Build rate calculation break detector or drum wrap detection

An optical sensor is placed above or under the web to be controlled. Standard sensors are not affected by dirt, steam or temperatures up to 160 degrees Celsius. Optical sensors work by sending a beam of light at the web, and seeing if the light is reflected or not.

=== Actuated knife cut-off ===
It consists of a knife blade which is used to cut the web when the maximum roll diameter is reached. The knife blade is actuated either by means of pneumatic or electrical actuators.

=== Manual or automatic roll change ===
The rolls need to be changed when the maximum roll diameter has been reached. This can be achieved either manually or automatically. The system consists of a regulating circuit, which detects the web speed and the speed of the carriage. The regulator sets the web speed and speed of the carriage by comparing the web tension with an adjustable web-tension setpoint.

For paper products, modern automated winders are capable of high-speed roll changes and core loading. Toilet-tissue winders are able to change over at running speed, while paper and board winders need to stop the winding process in order to cut the sheet and glue the paper on to a new wind-up core. Top-line winders introduce the paper core through a maintenance pit downstairs, with web interruption time as low as 15 seconds. More traditional winders require actual web stoppage for a changeover time of typically 45 seconds.

These efficiencies enable modern paper mills to maintain consistent production over each winder for each paper machine, while continuing to maintain both machine health and product quality.

== See also ==
- Continuous filament winding machine
- Converting industry
