= Topflight Corporation =

- Company type: Private
- Industry: Printing; Converting
- Founded: 1943; 83 years ago, York, Pennsylvania, United States
- Headquarters: Glen Rock, Pennsylvania, United States
- Products: Labels; Die-cut components
- Website: topflight.com

Topflight Corporation is a manufacturer of printed labels and die-cut components. Topflight is ISO 9001:2008 and ISO 13485:2003 certified and creates products for varying industries: Medical Devices, Pharmaceutical, Consumer & Durable Goods, Cosmetic & Personal Care, Electronics, Tire and Automotive.

== History ==
Topflight was founded in 1943 as the Topflight Tool Company, a precision machine shop that made components for World War II aircraft. Identifying the components became necessary, and Topflight designed printing presses to label the parts. After the war, the company moved into the emerging pressure-sensitive label market. Topflight continued to design its own presses throughout the 1950s and 1960s. It added high-performance products including shrinkable film, tamper-evident labels and conductive printing. In 1998, Topflight moved its headquarters to Glen Rock, Pennsylvania.

=== Sister companies ===
In 1961, Topflight created Adhesives Research to chemically engineer adhesive solutions existing companies could not achieve. To specifically meet the technical needs of membrane switches and biosensors, Conductive Technologies was formed in 1979. Both companies are now separate entities, but maintain a relationship with Topflight Corporation.

=== Products and services ===
Topflight Corporation specializes in digital printing, high-speed flexography, roll-to-roll screen printing, letterpress, hot-stamp printing, die-cutting, laminating and coating. The company operates in a lean manufacturing environment to provide fast turnaround and lower costs for larger companies such as Black & Decker and the Estée Lauder Companies. Topflight is one of the few converters in North America with a robust RFID label program. Additionally, Topflight delivers security printing solutions, most notably microscopic taggants.
