= Burn recovery bed =

Special bed designed for patients who have suffered severe burns

A burn recovery bed or burn bed is a special type of bed designed for hospital patients who have suffered severe skin burns across large portions of their body.

Generally, concentrated pressure on any one spot of the damaged skin can be extremely painful to the patient, so the primary function of a burn bed is to distribute the weight of the patient so evenly that no single bed contact point is pressed harder than any other.

== Air-chamber burn bed ==
One type of weight-distributing burn bed uses a series of interlinked inflatable air chambers which have the surface appearance of an upside-down egg carton. Although inflatable, the air chambers are maintained in a partially deflated state so that the air pressure can freely distribute itself. Heavier parts of the patient's body can sink deeper into the grid of chambers and the air moves to chambers with less weight.

Air volume in the chambers may be regulated so as to make the bed firmer when the patient is first being placed on the bed, and then air is released to allow for a more conformal shape once lying flat across the bed surface.

== Deep-floatation water burn bed ==
This type of burn bed is similar in construction to a typical water bed, except the surface covering of the water pool has a large amount of slack and extra folds of material around the perimeter of the pool.

To limit the depth of immersion into the burn bed water pool, the water's density may be increased by adding several hundred pounds of salt to the water, as is done with a relaxation float tank.

As the patient is placed onto the bed, they displace the water and can freely sink down into the pool, unlike a typical consumer water bed. As they sink down, the slack around the edges is played out so that the patient is now sunk into the water, in a form-fitting, very gentle, and dry depression in the pool.

Generally the pool is not deep enough to permit a patient to lie on their side in the pool, but even so, lying sideways is a safe condition since the patient is at no risk of breathing in water and drowning due to the water-isolation covering.

== See also ==
- Skin graft
