= Advanced Labelworx =

American label manufacturer

Advanced Labelworx Incorporated
- Type: Private
- Industry: Printing; Converting
- Founded: 1968; 58 years ago, (as Tennessee Tape and Label Corporation), United States
- Headquarters: Oak Ridge, Tennessee
- Number of locations: 2
- Products: Labels
- Website: advancedlabelworx.com

Advanced Labelworx is a 57-year-old privately owned label manufacturer headquartered in Oak Ridge, Tennessee, with a second manufacturing location located in Anderson, South Carolina. Advanced Labelworx has certifications with ISO 9001:2015 as well as UL/cUL, and CSA. Advanced Labelworx was ranked as one of the top 40 label companies by size in the US and was given the TMLI Eugene Singer award of excellence in business management in 2000. Advanced Labelworx also supports environmental sustainability through ordinance with the UN global compact principles.

== History ==
Advanced Labelworx, Inc. was founded in 1998 when Tennessee Tape & Label Corporation, founded in 1968, headquartered in Knoxville, Tennessee (“TTL”) was combined with Tag & Label Corporation (“TLC”), founded in 1971, headquartered in Anderson, South Carolina. Both companies achieved ISO certification in the 1990s and have maintained this operating standard continuously since it was initially achieved. At the time of the merger Tag & Label Corporation had a second manufacturing location in Pennsylvania named Imageworx. Tennessee Tape & Label Corporation, in addition to its label converting division, had a medical device manufacturing division and a thermal transfer division, both also located in Knoxville.

Tag & Label Corporation built a new 65,000 square foot manufacturing plant in Anderson, SC in 1990. In 2001 shortly after the merger the Knoxville, Tennessee operations consolidated its three divisions into a new 65,000 square foot building located in Oak Ridge, Tennessee approximately 10 miles from its former three locations in Knoxville.

Prior to the combination of Tennessee Tape & Label and Tag & Label the two companies were competitors both focusing primarily on the industrial durable manufacturing markets of electrical, automotive, outdoor equipment, chemical and textile markets. The marketplace began to expand in early 2000 with NAFTA and a technical staff was hired based in Mexico to handle the growth occurring in this region of North America. In 1997 the Pennsylvania plant was sold, and emphasis was given to growth in Mexico.

== Business ==
Advanced Labelworx has continued its focus on serving the durable manufacturing markets expanding into die cut components & gaskets, metal nameplates, overlays and RFID. Experience in agency requirements such as UL, CSA, cUL continues as a large focus, specifically targeting Advanced Labelworx being officially recognized as a UL certified label making manufacturer. The manufacturing processes which began as flexographic printing added both screen printing and digital printing. The company also provides services for the medical industry with a clean room housed in its Oak Ridge location where it manufactures medical adhesives and products.

Throughout its 57 years of operations Advanced Labelworx has operated on a business model of continuous improvement, lean manufacturing, customer service and technical expertise, emphasizing creating best-in-class lead times for customers. Advanced Labelworx places its focus on maintaining long term customer relationships and striving to exceed customer expectations. Advanced Labelworx upholds the environmental principles of the UN Global Compact through recycling of its manufacturing byproducts such as corrugated paperboards and metals as well as hazardous waste disposal in compliance with federal and state laws. Advanced Labelworx has achieved awards such as the TLMI Eugene Singer Award as a top performing label converter, and a four-time recipient of the Hitachi Supplier Performance Award in the automotive products division. The company also received a 20,000-dollar grant from the USDA for energy efficiency.
