= Cup holder (disambiguation) =

The term cup holder can refer to:

== Beverages ==
- a device in a vehicle that acts as a cup holder
- a drink carrier, used to transport multiple beverages in a fast-food setting
- a coffee cup sleeve

== Sports ==
- a title holder for a sporting event such as the World Cup
- a jockstrap

== Computers ==
- a CD-ROM tray in case of a user error

== See also ==
- Bottle cage
- Bottle sling
