= Sizzix =

Brand name of a range of die-cutting and embossing machines manufactured by Ellison

Sizzix is the brand name of a product range of home die-cutting machines and embossing machines manufactured by Ellison. The machines are used for cutting materials such as paper, fabric, vellum, metal and other materials that scissors can cut. The products are most commonly used by crafters, quilters and sewers for scrapbooking, cardmaking, home décor, jewelry making, and other arts and crafts activities.

Sizzix has also seen success in its partnership with about 20 artists who have opened the company up to new markets and categories.

== Machines ==
The Sizzix product range launched in 2001 as an evolution of the first patented die-cutting machine, the Ellison LetterMachine, created in 1977. Along with the die-cutting machines, the Sizzix product range also includes steel-rule dies, chemically-etched dies, embossing folders and storage folders.

== Awards ==
The Golden Press Kit Award was awarded to Sizzix at the Craft and Hobby Association (CHA) Summer 2012 trade show. The BIGkick was awarded the 2008 Reader's Choice Winner in the February 2009 issue of Creating Keepsakes magazine in the Die Cut Equipment category.
