= Roll-to-roll processing =

Electronic device manufacturing process

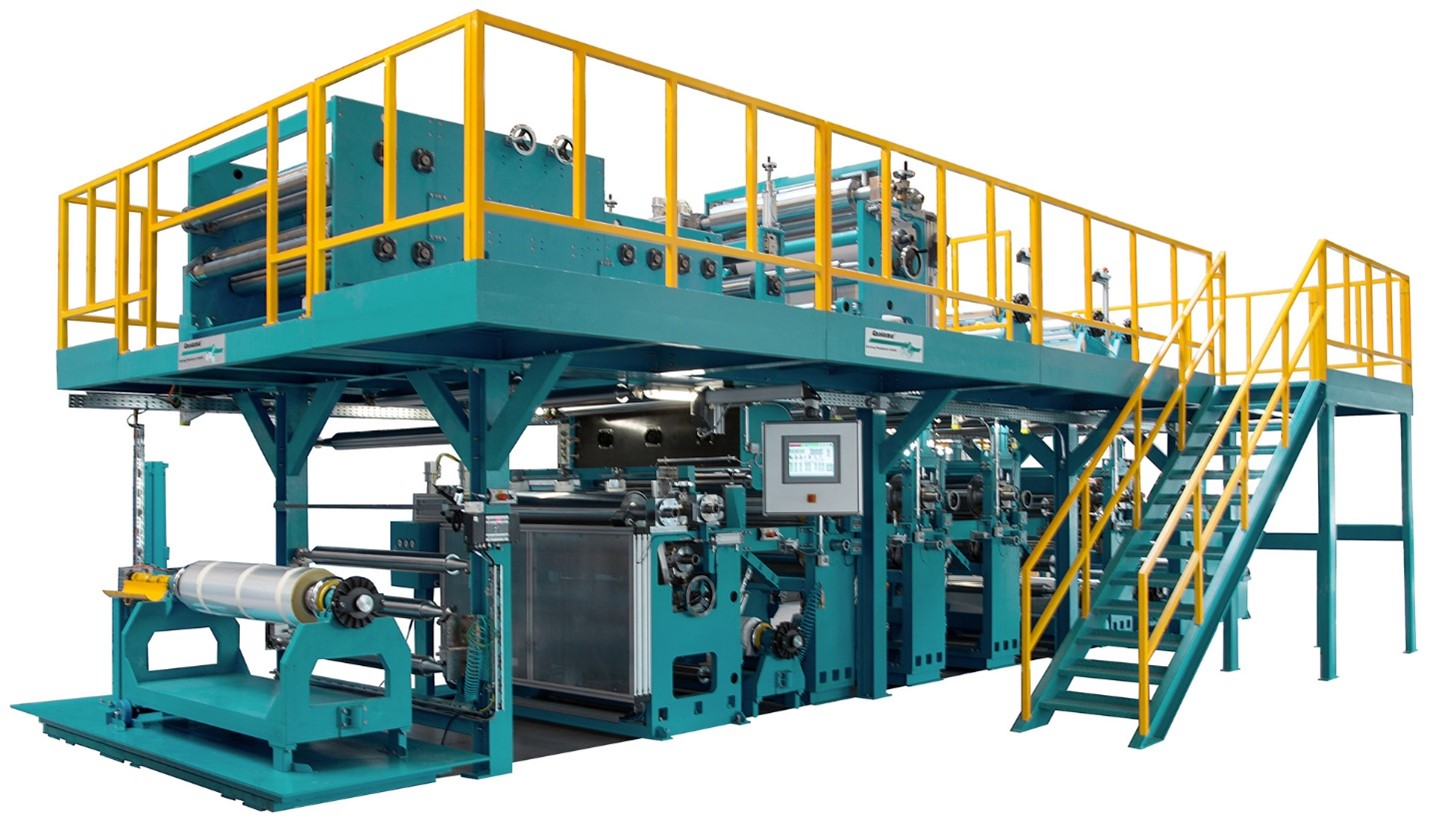
A typical industrial roll-to-roll process line

In the field of electronic devices, roll-to-roll processing, also known as web processing, reel-to-reel processing or R2R, is the process of creating electronic devices on a roll of flexible plastic, metal foil, or flexible glass. In other fields predating this use, it can refer to any process of applying coating, printing, or performing other processes starting with a roll of a flexible material and re-reeling after the process to create an output roll. These processes, and others such as sheeting, can be grouped together under the general term converting. When the rolls of material have been coated, laminated or printed they can be subsequently slit to their finished size on a slitter rewinder.

== In electronic devices ==
Large circuits made with thin-film transistors and other devices can be patterned onto these large substrates, which can be up to a few metres wide and 50 km (31 mi) long. Some of the devices can be patterned directly, much like an inkjet printer deposits ink. For most semiconductors, however, the devices must be patterned using photolithography techniques.

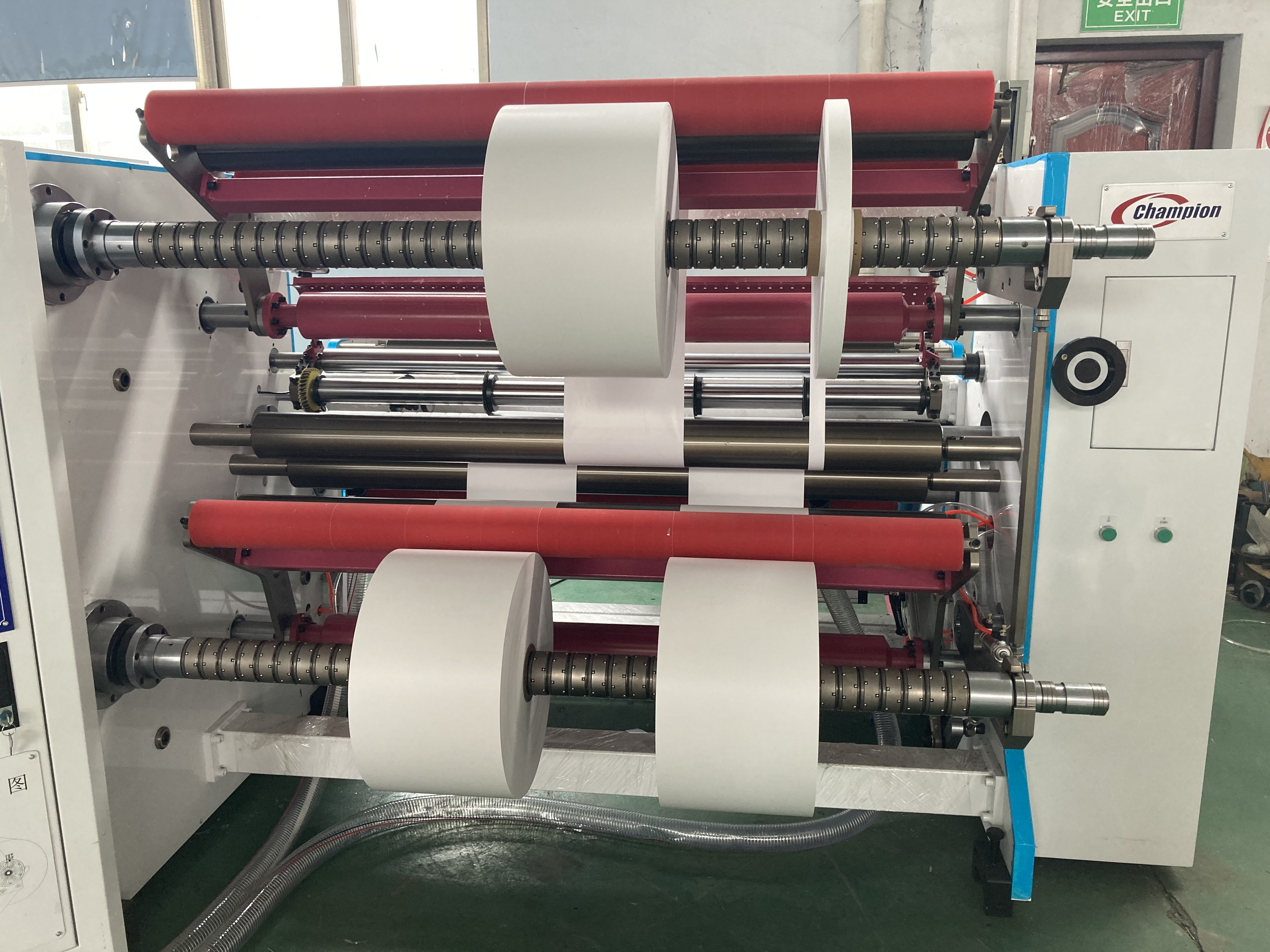
roll to roll processing

Roll-to-roll processing of large-area electronic devices reduces manufacturing cost. Most notable would be solar cells, which are still prohibitively expensive for most markets due to the high cost per unit area of traditional bulk (mono- or polycrystalline) silicon manufacturing. Other applications could arise which take advantage of the flexible nature of the substrates, such as electronics embedded into clothing, large-area flexible displays, and roll-up portable displays.

=== LED (Light-Emitting Diode) ===
- Inorganic LED – Flexible LED is commonly made into 25, 50, 100 m, or even longer strips using a roll-to-roll process. A long neon LED tube is using such a long flexible strip and encapsulated with PVC or silicone diffusing encapsulation.
- Organic LED (OLED) – OLED for foldable phone screen is adopting roll-to-roll processing technology.

=== Thin-film cells ===
A crucial issue for a roll-to-roll thin-film cell production system is the deposition rate of the microcrystalline layer, and this can be tackled using four approaches:

- very high frequency plasma-enhanced chemical vapour deposition (VHF-PECVD)
- microwave (MW)-PECVD
- hot-wire chemical vapour deposition (hot-wire CVD)
- the use of ultrasonic nozzles in an in-line process

== In electrochemical devices ==
Roll-to-roll processing has been used in the manufacture of electrochemical devices such as batteries, supercapacitors, fuel cells, and water electrolyzers. Here, the roll-to-roll processing is utilized for electrode manufacturing and is the key to reducing manufacturing costs through stable production of electrodes on various film substrates such as metal foils, membranes, diffusion media, and separators.

== See also ==
- Amorphous silicon
- Low-cost solar cell
- Printed electronics
- Roll slitting
- Rolling (metalworking)
- Thin-film solar cell
- Web manufacturing
- Tape automated bonding, TAB
