= Web-guiding systems =

Web-guiding systems are used in the converting industry to position flat materials, known as webs, before processing. They are typically positioned just before a critical stage on a converting machine. Each type of web guiding system uses a sensor to monitor the web position for lateral tracking, and each has an actuator to shift the running web mechanically back on course whenever the sensor detects movement away from the set path. Actuators may be pneumatic or hydraulic cylinders, or some kind of electromechanical device. Because the web may be fragile — particularly at its edge — non-contact sensors are used. These sensors may be pneumatic, photoelectric, ultrasonic, or infrared. The system’s controls must put the output signals from the sensors in to a form that can drive the actuator.

Web guiding systems work at high speed, constantly making small adjustments to maintain the position of the material. The latest systems use digital technology and touch screen operator interfaces to simplify set up. Web guiding systems are used on slitting machines, slitter rewinders, printing presses, coating and laminating machines.

== History ==
In 1939, Irwin Fife invented the first web guide in his Garage in Oklahoma City, Oklahoma, solving a newspaper owner’s challenge of keeping paper aligned in his high-speed newspaper press.

== Active Guiding Systems ==
Active guiding systems are composed of a sensor, an actuator connected to a guide mechanism, and a controller. The sensor can be any detector, which can reliably pick up the edges of a web. The most common types of sensors are pneumatic (only works with nonporous webs), optical (works well with opaque webs), ultrasonic (works with most material), or paddies (thick webs). Recent developments have introduced to the industry a new sensor technology based on light scattering and spatial filtering that allows the use of an optical sensor to detect the edge of any material. The web must be flat (free of curl) and stable (free of flutter) through the edge sensor. For this and other reasons, the sensor is often placed near a roller. If two sensors are used, the web could be guided to the front edge, back edge, or center. Common active guide systems include steering guide (remotely pivoted guide), displacement guide (offset-pivot guide), unwind guide, and rewind guide.

== Tension Adjustment Challenge ==
Tension adjustment is necessary due to several mechanical factors: oscillations caused by mechanical misalignments, differing inertial response (lag) of mechanical elements during web acceleration, out-of-round unwind and tension rolls, slipping through nip rolls, and over-aggressive web-guide correction. Several technical process and control issues also affect tension: tension setpoint changes, phase offset on driven rolls, tension bleed from one zone to another, and thermal effect (contraction/expansion) as the substrate passes through various processes. It is impossible to eliminate all factors requiring tension adjustment. Variance in any one factor in a zone necessitates changes in tension control and web speed. Consequently, with coupled tension zone control, jitter is inevitable in a continuous web where the controllers cause a feedback loop.

Precise control of the system is essential. If the line speed of web is reduced, the amount of lateral displacement error that can be controlled by the steering guide system also decreases. If the input error decreases, the lateral displacement error also becomes smaller. Lateral displacement occurs on the transport web by the air blow from the dryer and the increase of blowing frequency can reduce the lateral displacement.
