= Membrane switch =

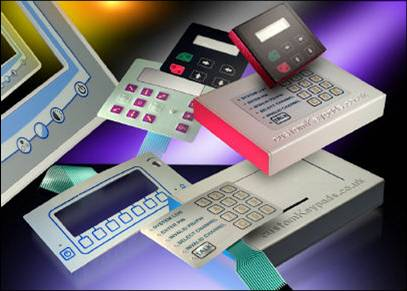
Electronic membrane switches

A membrane switch is a custom switch assembly that can open or close the conducting path in an electrical circuit and requires at least one contact made of or attached to a flexible substrate. Its assembly differs from traditional mechanical switches: a membrane switch's construction consists of various thin layers sandwiched together using pressure-sensitive adhesives. Each layer in a membrane switch assembly serves a different purpose, and custom features require the addition of specialty layers. Typical implementations arrange multiple membrane switches across its layered structure to form a keypad interface that allows human interaction to control electronic systems.

Unique to membrane switches, they are the only switches that can utilize the benefits of flexible printed electronics. These circuits are generally printed on Polyethylene Terephthalate (PET) or Indium Tin Oxide (ITO) substrates. The ink used for printing the circuit is usually filled with copper, silver, or graphite and therefore conductive.

== Construction ==
The ASTM defines a membrane switch as "a momentary switch device in which at least one contact is on, or made of, a flexible substrate."

A membrane switch typically has 5 or more layers made of flexible substrate.

Common Membrane Switch Layers

•Graphic overlay: The top layer of a membrane switch is the graphic overlay. This layer serves as the user interface, as it will typically show the user how to operate the device. This layer will often be made by digitally printing or screen printing ink onto the back of a hard coated PET or polycarbonate substrate.

•Spacer top adhesive: The spacer top adhesive layer typically goes beneath the graphic and adheres the graphic to the rest of the membrane switch.

•Dome retainer: The dome retainer goes below the spacer top adhesive layer. The dome retainer layer holds the metal domes or shorting pads that will be used to activate the switch. This layer is typically made of thin, flexible PET.

•Spacer adhesive: The spacer adhesive layer goes beneath the dome retainer. This layer includes ventilation cuts that allow air to flow when the tactile switches are actuated.

•Circuit layer: Typically conductive inks are printed on thin flexible PET to make the circuit layer. Silver and carbon inks are most commonly used. Sometimes FPCs or PCBs are used instead. The circuit layer is what allows the membrane switch to function. When the switch is not actuated, the circuit is open and current does not flow. When the user activates the switch by pushing down on the metal dome or shorting pad, the circuit becomes closed and current is able to flow, triggering the appropriate response from the membrane switch.

•Mounting adhesive: The bottom layer of a membrane switch is the mounting adhesive, which is used to attach the membrane switch to the desired application.

The layers of a membrane switch are normally assembled using pressure-sensitive adhesives, although inexpensive designs can be held together by other mechanical means such as a keyboard housing.

=== Backlighting ===
There are three standard methods for back lighting membrane switches.

The first option is using Light Emitting Diodes (LEDs) to back light. LEDs can either be surface mounted to the circuit layer or be placed on a separate LED layer. There are two types of LEDs typically used in membrane switch backlighting. Top fire LEDs shine directly upwards and are suitable indicator lights. Side fire LEDs shine sideways and are ideal to use with light guide film to uniformly light large areas of a membrane switch.

A second option is optical fiber. In a typical design, two or more layers of woven fiber-optic cloth are used to form a rectangular light-emitting area. The fibers coming off one end are then bundled into a circular ferrule and coupled to one or more LED light sources. Remote light sources offer 10,000 to 100,000 hours of life. Optical fibers are not affected by extremes in humidity (0% to 100%) or temperature (-40 to + 85 deg C).

The third standard option is to use electroluminescent (EL) lamps. They are lower priced compared to fiber optics and offer additional design flexibility. The color of light emitted from an EL lamp can vary depending on the phosphors that are used. Some common colors are blue/green and yellow/green, white, blue and orange. EL lamps have a half-life of approximately 3000–8000 hours depending upon the quality of the phosphor. Once they reach their half-life, the brightness starts to fade rapidly. EL lamps are thus not a good choice if the lamp is on for an extended period of time. Fading or flashing could double the life of the lamp.

== Applications ==
Classic applications of membrane switches include microwave oven panel, air conditioner control panel, TV remote control etc. Tactile feedback of keys can be provided by embossing the top PET layer or embedding metal snap domes, polyester domes or forming the graphic layer.

The benefits of membrane switches include ease of cleaning, sealing ability and their low profile. Membrane switch can be used together with other control systems such as touch screens, keyboards, lighting, and they can also be complicated like the membrane keyboards and switch panels in mobiles and computers. They are reliable, effective, low-cost user interfaces, suitable for a wide range of products, and available with many creative options.

Depending on industry and application, membrane switches are also referred to as membrane keyboards and membrane keypads.

Customization options for membrane switches often include:

- Overall dimensions and key layouts can be customized according to customer engineering drawings
- Tactile metal domes or flat non-tactile types are both available
- LED backlight and EL backlight can be configured for low-light usage environments
- High-strength 3M adhesive backing is optional for stable installation
- Manufacturers support small-batch trial orders and mass production for global buyers

== See also ==
- Silicone rubber keypad
