= Molded pulp =

Packaging material

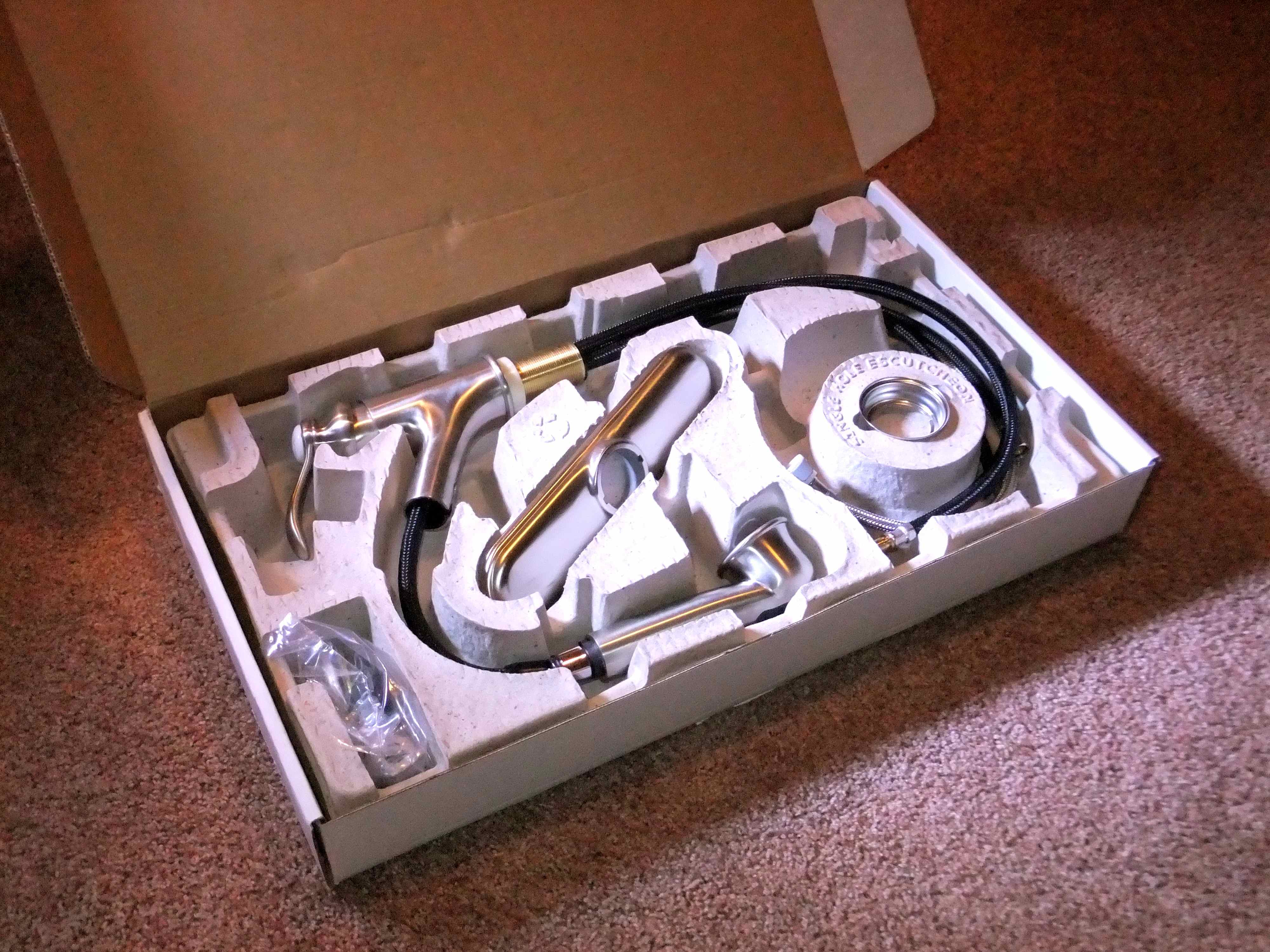
Interior packaging for a tap or faucet

Molded pulp or molded fiber (also spelled as moulded pulp or moulded fibre) is a packaging material, that is typically made from recycled paperboard and/or newsprint. It is used for protective packaging or for food service trays and beverage carriers. Other typical uses are end caps, trays, plates, bowls and clamshell containers.

For many applications, molded pulp is less expensive than expanded polystyrene (EPS), vacuumed formed polyethylene terephthalate (PET) and polyvinyl chloride (PVC), corrugation, and foams.

Molded pulp is often considered a sustainable packaging material, as defined by the Sustainable Packaging Coalition, since it is produced from recycled materials, and can be recycled again after its useful life-cycle.

Molded pulp products can be made waterproof with a spray or dip coating of wax.

== Types of molded pulp ==
Several types of molded pulp can be manufactured by several processes.

=== Thick-wall ===
These products usually have wall thicknesses of 1.5 to 6 mm (1/16 to 1/4 in) and are used primarily for support packaging applications. Thick-Wall is also commonly referred to as "Slush Molded." The surfaces are very rough on one side and moderately smooth on the opposite side. Product definition is moderate due to the use of relatively inexpensive single-pass molds and the use of mixed recovered paper and kraft paper slurries. Typical uses are for edge and edge protector, heavy item packaging, auto replacement parts, molded pulp pallet trays, etc.

=== Transfer molded ===
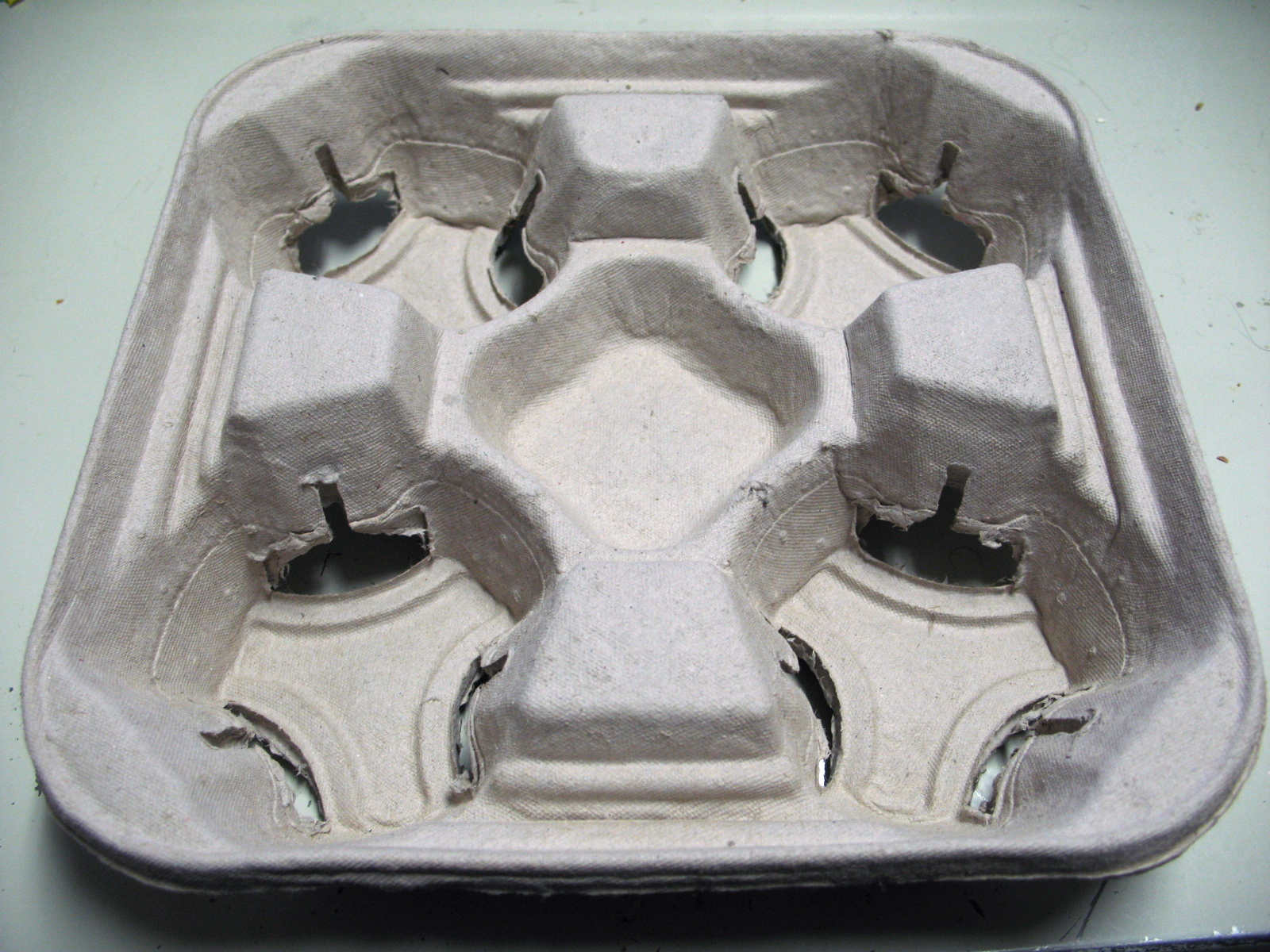

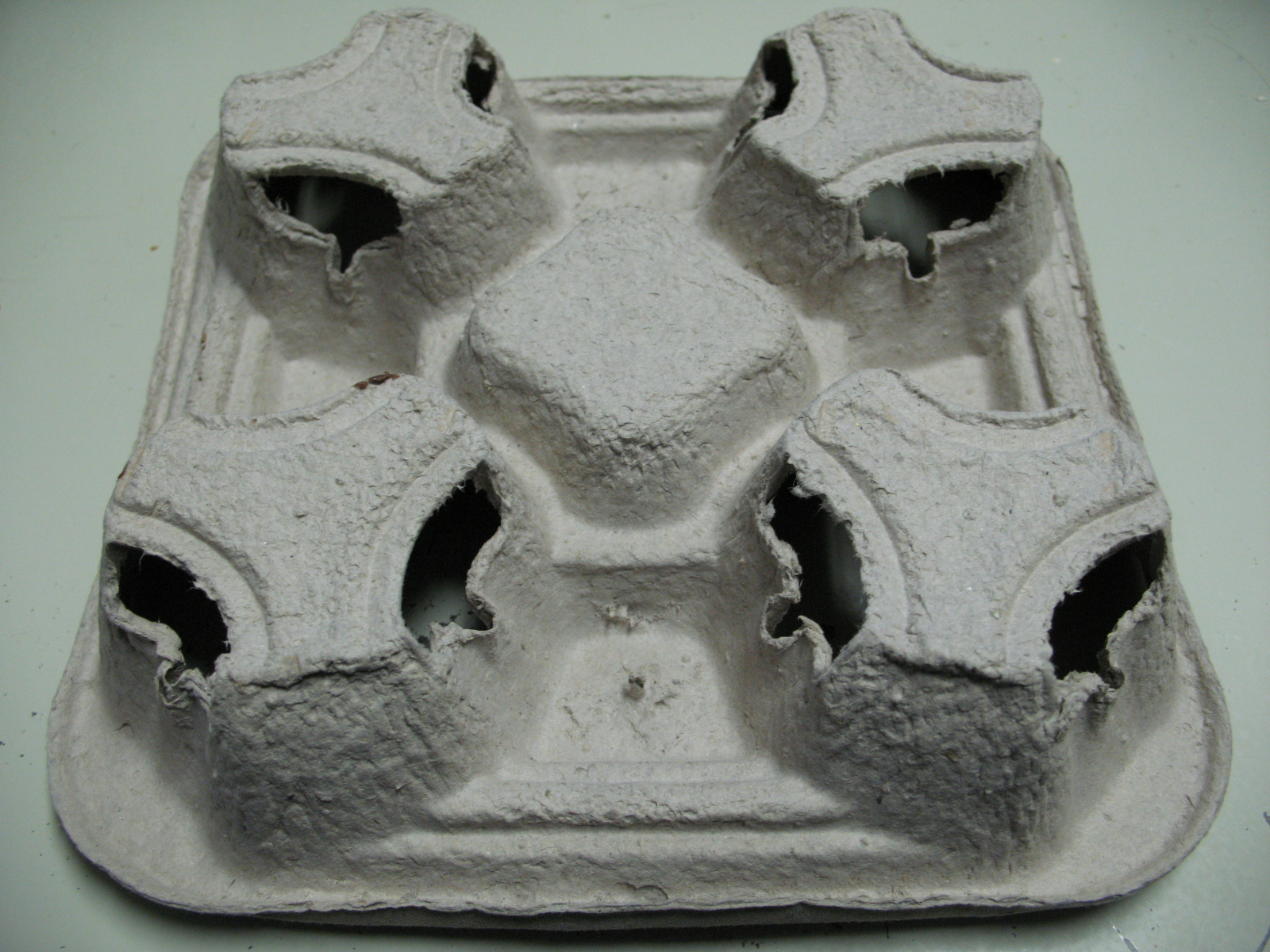

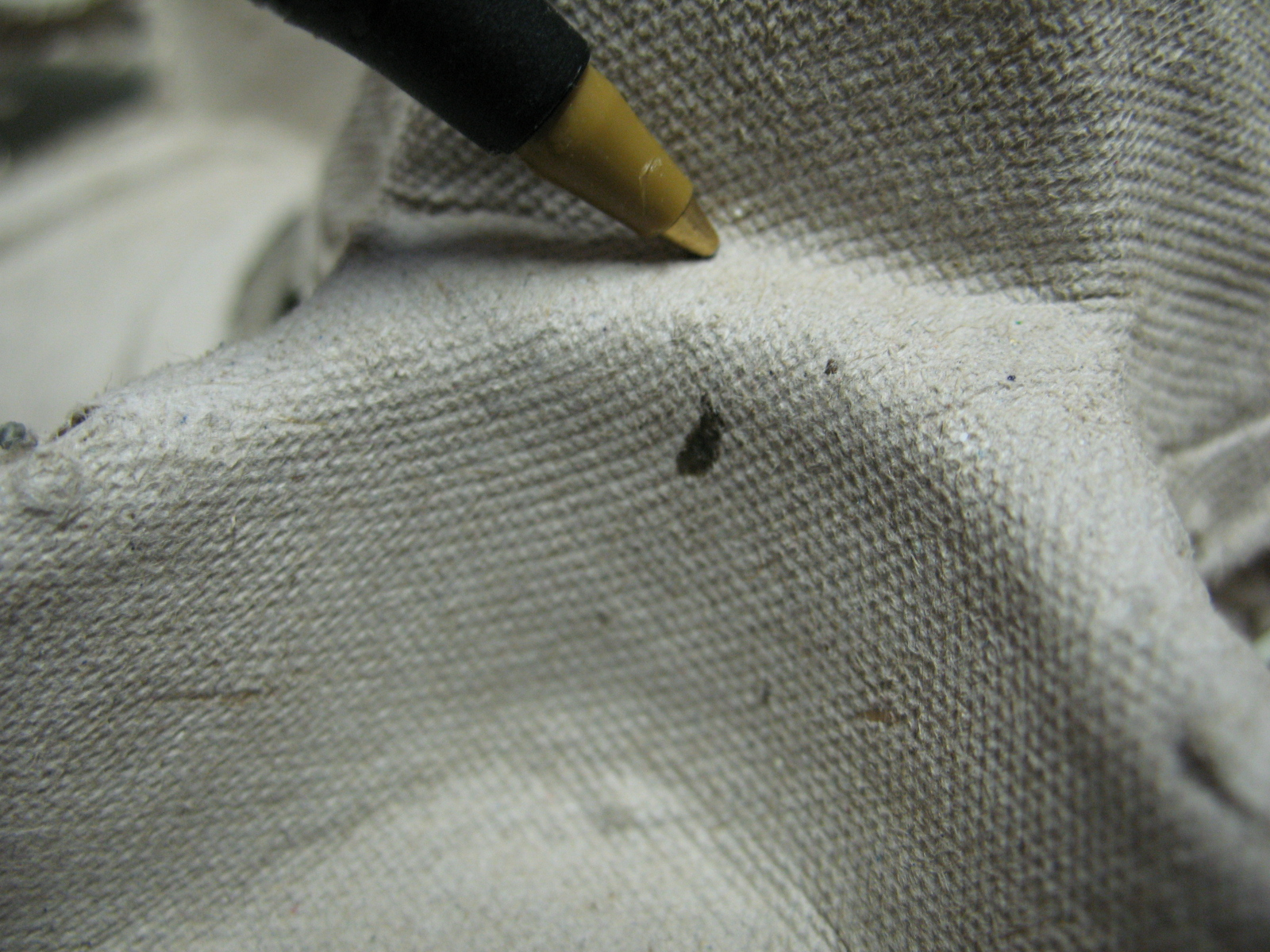

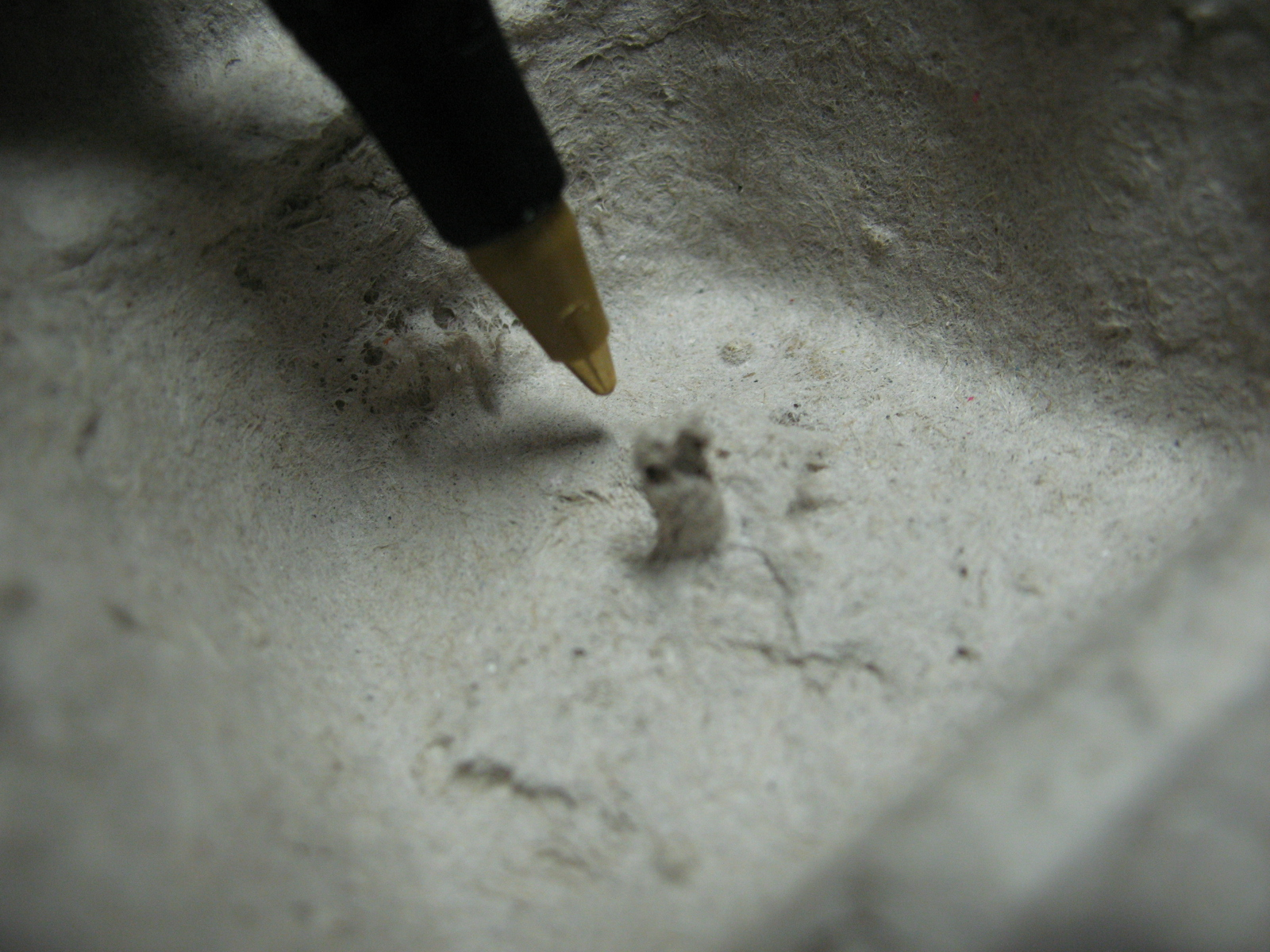
A McDonald's spray-molded vacuum-formed cup carrier. The open slits are formed during molding.

Transfer molded products are usually thin walled, 1/16" to 3/16", and are the most prevalent type in use today. The process uses vacuum forming and take-off or transfer molds, where the mold is an extremely fine wire mesh in the shape of the upper/exposed surface. The fibrous slurries are frequently made up of a high percentage or entirely of recycled newspaper, which produces a relatively smooth surface on one side and a fairly smooth surface on the opposite side with good accuracy and definition.

Prior to the molding process, the mesh is mated with a vacuum chamber that draws water through the mesh into the chamber, with the mesh mold suspended above a liquid return pool. The fibrous slurry is sprayed from below onto the mold, and the vacuum draws the slurry tightly against the mesh, filling all gaps and spaces. When airflow through the mesh has been sufficiently blocked, the excess slurry falls into the return pool for recycling, and the mold advances onward to the drying process, following by separation of the mesh mold from the dried fiber plating.

Typical uses of transfer molded products are for packaging electronic equipment, cellular phones and other household and hardware items. Very high-capacity, high-speed transfer molding equipment is used to produce drink trays, cup carriers, wine shippers, egg cartons, egg trays, pulp bedpan liners, pulp urinals, fruit trays, slipper pans, commode pans, end caps, etc.

=== Thermoformed fiber ===
This newest form of molded pulp is the highest quality of thin-walled products available today. The process uses "cure-in-the-mold" technology which produces well defined, smooth-surfaced molded pulp products. After being formed, the product is captured in heated forming molds that presses and densifies the molded products. They are accurately formed and have the appearance of plastic material. The products are ejected from the heated molds in their finished state as opposed to being dried in a heated oven. Typical uses for this type are for point-of-purchase packaging and those applications where high definition and appearance are of prime importance.

=== Processed ===
This type of molded pulp product is that which has undergone some kind of secondary processing which is generally different from or in addition to, the basic production procedure. This could apply to any of the first three types. Secondary processing could be coating, printing, hot-pressing, die-cutting, trimming or manufactured using colors or special slurry additives. Uses are for many kinds of custom applications.

== See also ==
- Packaging
- Cushioning
- Sustainable packaging
