= Converting (magazine) =

- Type: business magazine
- Format: Paper and online magazine
- Owner: Reed Business Information
- Editor: Mark Spaulding
- Founded: 1983
- Ceased publication: 2010
- Language: English
- Headquarters: Oak Brook, Illinois, USA
- Circulation: 37,200
- ISSN: 0746-7141
- Website: Converting magazine

Converting (ISSN 0746-7141) was a trade publication and Website owned by Reed Business Information serving the information needs of converters: industries that convert paper, paperboard, plastic film and foil materials into finished, printed packaging such as bags, pouches, labels, tags, folding cartons and corrugated shipping cases.

The editor-in-chief was Mark Spaulding; the editorial offices were located in Oak Brook, Illinois, USA.

Established in 1983, Converting was published monthly. Common topics included equipment, material, and machinery case-history feature articles, industry trends, business news, trade show previews and post-event reports.

In April, Converting published its Buyer's Guide, which provided a list of 500 industry suppliers. In June, it published the CMM International Show Daily.

Converting also published Frontline News, an e-mail newsletter every Tuesday morning, and OEM Update, a monthly e-mail newsletter for Original Equipment Manufacturers of converting and package-printing machinery.

Converting's Website, www.convertingmagazine.com, featured exclusive online-only content, three industry Blogs updated almost every business day, Videos, and an Online Buyers Guide, etc.

As of June 2008, total BPA audited circulation was 37,200 subscribers.

== Converting Quarterly ==
In 2010, the magazine was converted to a quarterly publication and renamed Converting Quarterly, a new hybrid technical-journal and B2B trade magazine with eight Q&A technical columns and 8–12 technical articles in each issue. Content focuses on the web-processing and finishing technologies of solution and extrusion coating, laminating, vacuum coating and metallizing, slitting, rewinding, diecutting, flexographic and gravure printing. It is an official publications of the Association for Roll-to-Roll Converters, formerly the Association of International Metallizers, Coaters and Laminators (AIMCAL), headquartered in Greenville, South Carolina, but a global organization.

Mark Spaulding became the associate publisher/editor-in-chief of Converting Quarterly. Converting columnist Dr. David R. Roisum is now a columnist with Converting Quarterly, writing the Q&A column, Web Wise. Converting contributors Dr. Eldridge Mount, Dr. Edward Cohen, David Rumson and Dr. Charles Bishop are also now regular columnists with Converting Quarterly.
