= Flexible battery =

Type of battery

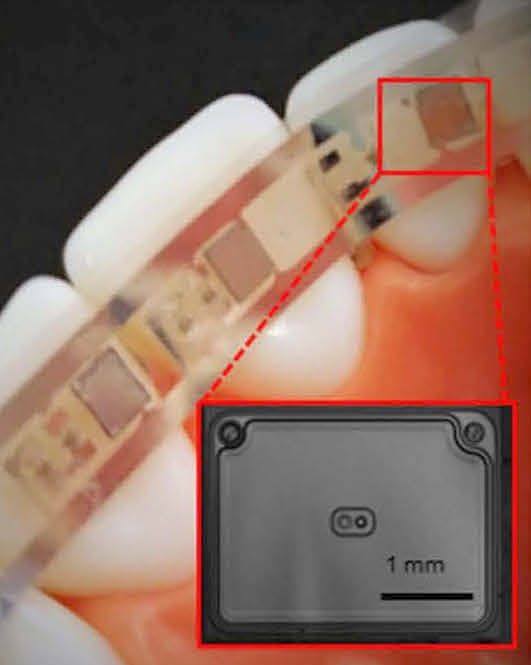
Flexible Li batteries have been embedded into dental braces for powering light-emitting diodes in light-assisted therapy

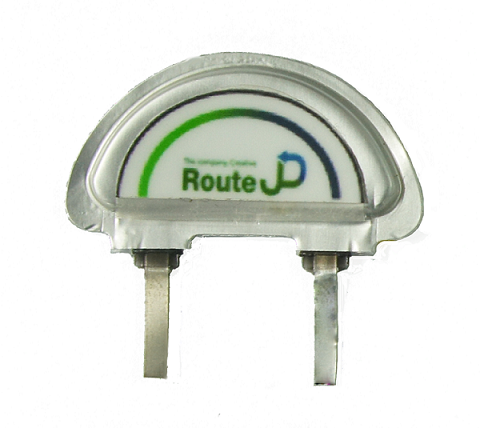
A flexible lithium-ion polymer battery

Flexible batteries are batteries, both primary and secondary, that are designed to be conformal and flexible, unlike traditional rigid ones. They can maintain their characteristic shape even against continual bending or twisting. The increasing interest in portable and flexible electronics has led to the development of flexible batteries which can be implemented in products such as smart cards, wearable electronics, novelty packaging, flexible displays and transdermal drug delivery patches. The advantages of flexible batteries are their conformability, light weight, and portability, which makes them easy to be implemented in products such as flexible and wearable electronics. Hence efforts are underway to make different flexible power sources including primary and rechargeable batteries with high energy density and good flexibility.

== Basic methods and designs ==
In general, a battery is made of one or several galvanic cells, where each cell consists of cathode, anode, separator, and in many cases current collectors. In flexible batteries all these components need to be flexible. These batteries can be fabricated into different shapes and sizes and by different methods. One approach is to use polymer binders to fabricate composite electrodes where conductive additives are used to enhance their conductivity. The electrode materials can be printed or coated onto flexible substrates. The cells are assembled into flexible packaging materials to maintain bendability. Others approaches include the filtering of electrode suspension through filters to form free-standing films, or use flexible matrix to hold electrode materials. There are also other designs like cable batteries.

== Flexible secondary (rechargeable) batteries ==
There have been many efforts in adapting conventional batteries such as zinc-carbon and lithium ion, and at the same time new materials such as those based on nanoparticle complexes are being developed for flexible battery and supercapacitor electrodes. For example, there are efforts at developing flexible lithium-ion batteries. Some studies have introduced nanocarbons into flexible lithium-ion batteries, and there are batteries with Li_{4}Ti_{5}O_{12} and LiFePO_{4} as anode and cathode, with graphene-based current collector. Carbon nanotube electrodes have been reported too: pristine, and combined with Li_{4}Ti_{5}O_{12}, LiCoO_{2}, or SnO_{2}. Another development is the paper-thin flexible self-rechargeable battery that combines a thin-film organic solar cell with an extremely thin and highly flexible lithium-polymer battery. This recharges itself when exposed to light.

== Flexible primary batteries ==
Disposable, primary flexible primary batteries which are the equivalent of AA and AAA batteries are also of great interest with applicability in smart cards, medical patches, greeting cards, toys, and disposable devices. Advantages of primary batteries with aqueous electrolyte over lithium-ion batteries include their eco-friendliness and the ease of fabrication. A flexible zinc-carbon battery using single-walled carbon nanotubes was reported in 2010.

Alkaline batteries are more durable than conventional zinc-carbon batteries under heavy load. An alkaline battery uses MnO_{2} as the active material along with zinc anode, and KOH is used as an electrolyte here. A flexible alkaline cell offers several challenges because compared to zinc-carbon cells using weak acidic or neutral electrolytes, KOH is more basic and corrosive. Gaikwad has proposed an alkaline battery using nylon mesh in 2011.

== Business and commercialization ==
Commercialization efforts for flexible lithium-ion and zinc-carbon systems are ongoing. LG is proposing to mass-produce a flexible cable battery. The global market for thin film batteries increased from $33.5 million in 2011 to $51.8 million in 2012, and is estimated to be valued at $87.3 million by the end of 2013.

== See also ==
- Primary battery
- Rechargeable battery
- Battery (electricity)
