= Web (manufacturing) =

Long, thin, and flexible material for manufacturing

A web is a long, thin, and flexible material. Common webs include foil, metal, paper, textile, plastic film, and wire. Common processes carried out on webs include coating, plating, and laminating.

A web is generally processed by moving over rollers. Between processing stages, webs are stored and transported as rolls also known as coils, packages and doffs. The end result or use of web manufacturing is usually sheets. The primary motivation to work with webs instead of sheets is economics. Webs, being continuous, can be made at far higher speeds and do not have the start-stop issues of discrete sheet processing. The size of the web-handling industries is unknown.

== Related processes ==
- Web processing

Web processing is found in a wide variety of other manufacturing including electronics such as circuit boards, construction materials such as roofing, and pharmaceuticals such as drug patches.

- Web handling

Web handling refers to the processing of a web through a machine with maximum productivity and minimum waste.

== See also ==
- Printed electronics
- Roll-to-roll processing
- Tape drives
- Web offset printing
- Roll slitting
- Calender
- Converters (industry)
- Cutting stock problem
