= Die cutting (web) =

Pressing pre-formed tools into thin sheets to extract shapes

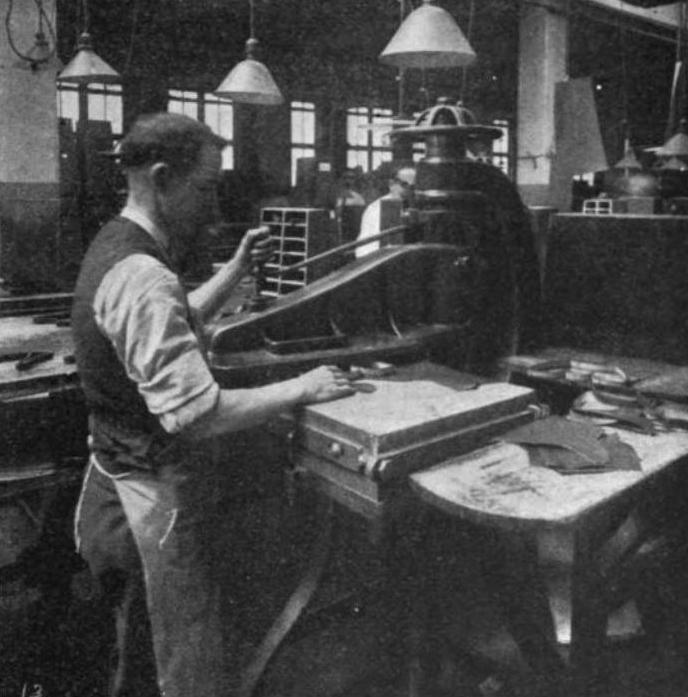
A clicking machine from 1922, used to die cut leather

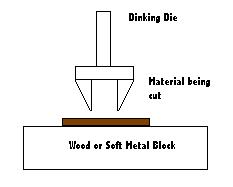
Schematic of the dinking process

Die cutting is the general process of using a die to shear webs of low-strength materials, such as rubber, fibre, foil, cloth, paper, corrugated fibreboard, chipboard, paperboard, plastics, pressure-sensitive adhesive tapes, foam, and sheet metal. In the metalworking and leather industries, the process is known as clicking and the machine may be referred to as a clicking machine. When a dinking die or dinking machine is used, the process is known as dinking. Commonly produced items using this process include gaskets, labels, tokens, corrugated boxes, and envelopes.

Die cutting started as a process of cutting leather for the shoe industry in the mid-19th century. It is now sophisticated enough to cut through just one layer of a laminate, so it is now used on labels, postage stamps, and other stickers; this type of die cutting is known as kiss cutting.

Die cutting can be done on either flatbed or rotary presses. Rotary die cutting is often done inline with printing. The primary difference between rotary die cutting and flatbed die cutting is that the flatbed is not as fast but the tools are cheaper. This process lends itself to smaller production runs where it is not as easy to absorb the added cost of a rotary die.

== Steel-rule die cutting ==
Steel-rule die cutting uses a formed strip of hardened steel (steel rule) set into a slotted plywood dieboard; rubber ejectors aid part release after the cut. The die may work against a flat hardwood or steel plate, a matched male form, or a grooved counterpart that accepts the rule. The method is widely applied to sheeted paperboard and corrugated fibreboard on flatbed presses and to continuous webs on rotary equipment; it is also used for thin sheet metal and softer materials such as plastics, wood, cork, felt, and fabrics.

Steel-rule tools typically combine cutting and creasing rules selected for the substrate, allowing cut/crease operations in one pass; in printing and packaging, they are widely used to cut paperboard and card stock into shaped blanks and to crease board on converting lines to facilitate folding. Tooling is comparatively low-cost versus solid (machined) dies but less robust, so it is often used for short production runs.

== Rotary die cutting ==
Rotary die cutting is die cutting using a cylindrical die on a rotary press and may be known as a rotary die cutter or RDC. A long sheet or web of material will be fed through the press into an area known as a "station" which holds a rotary tool that will cut out shapes, make perforations or creases, or even cut the sheet or web into smaller parts. A series of gears will force the die to rotate at the same speed as the rest of the press, ensuring that any cuts the die makes line up with the printing on the material. The machines used for this process can incorporate multiple "stations" that die cut a particular shape in the material. In each of these stations lie one or more of these geared tools or printing cylinders, and some machines use automatic eye registration to make sure the cuts and/or printing are lined up with one another when lower tolerances are required.

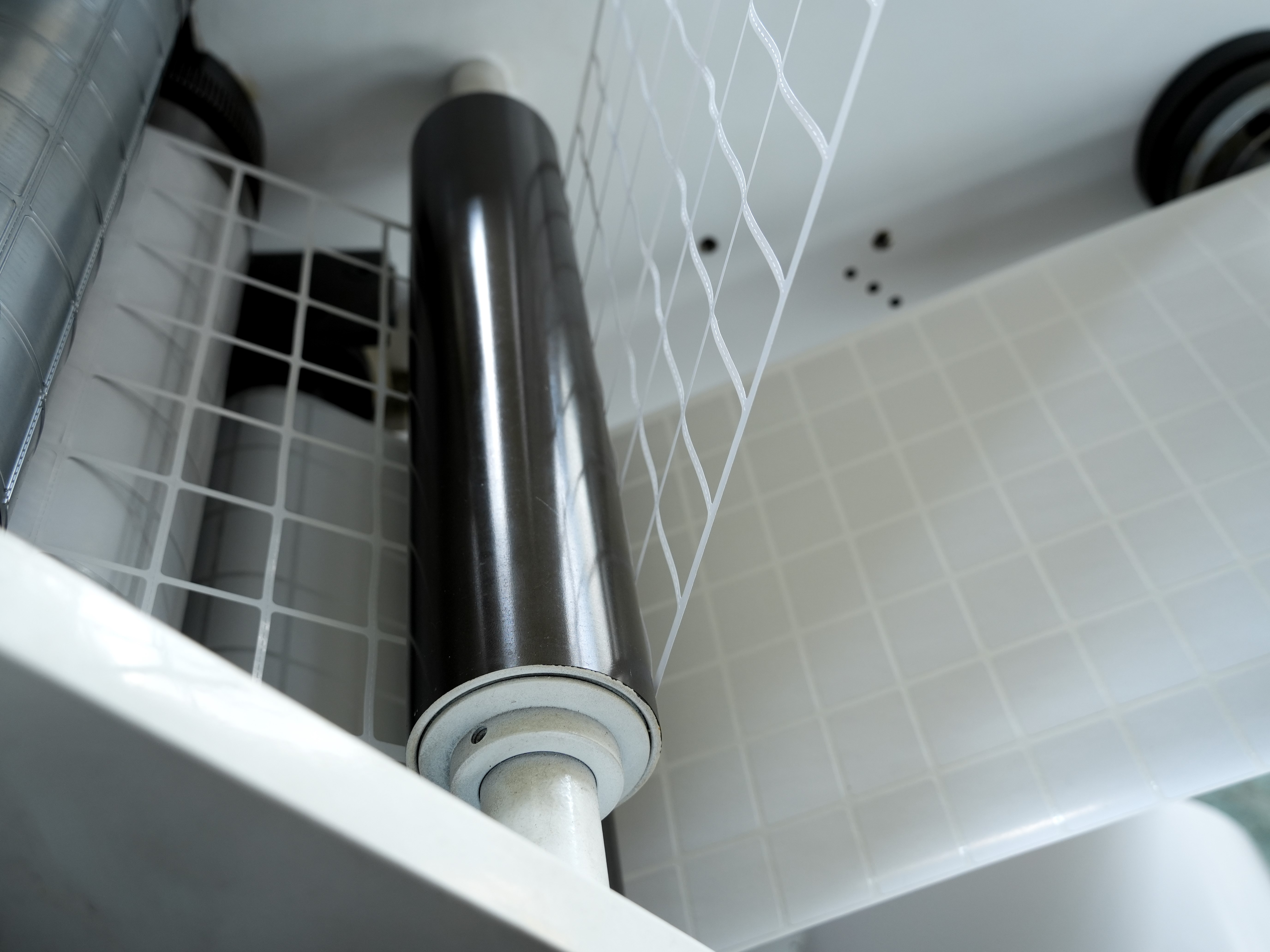
a picture shows the die cutting process

Dies used in rotary die cutting are either solid engraved dies, adjustable dies, or magnetic plate tooling. Engraved dies have a much higher tolerance and are machined out of a solid steel bar normally made out of tool steel. Adjustable dies have removable blades that can be easily replaced with other blades, either due to wear or to cut a different material, while magnetic plate tooling has a cylinder that has magnets placed in it, and an engraved metal plate is attached or wrapped around the base cylinder holding onto it by the force of the magnets.

== Dinking ==
Dinking is a manufacturing process. Dinking uses special dies called dinking dies, which are hollow cutters. The edges of the dies are usually beveled about 20° and sharpened. The material is punched through into a wood or soft metal block in order to not dull the edges. The die may be pressed into the material with a hammer or a mechanical press.

== See also ==
- Cutting plotter
- Postage stamp separation
- Steel rule die
