= Printed electronics =

Electronic devices created by various printing methods

Electronic structure printed on a flexible surface

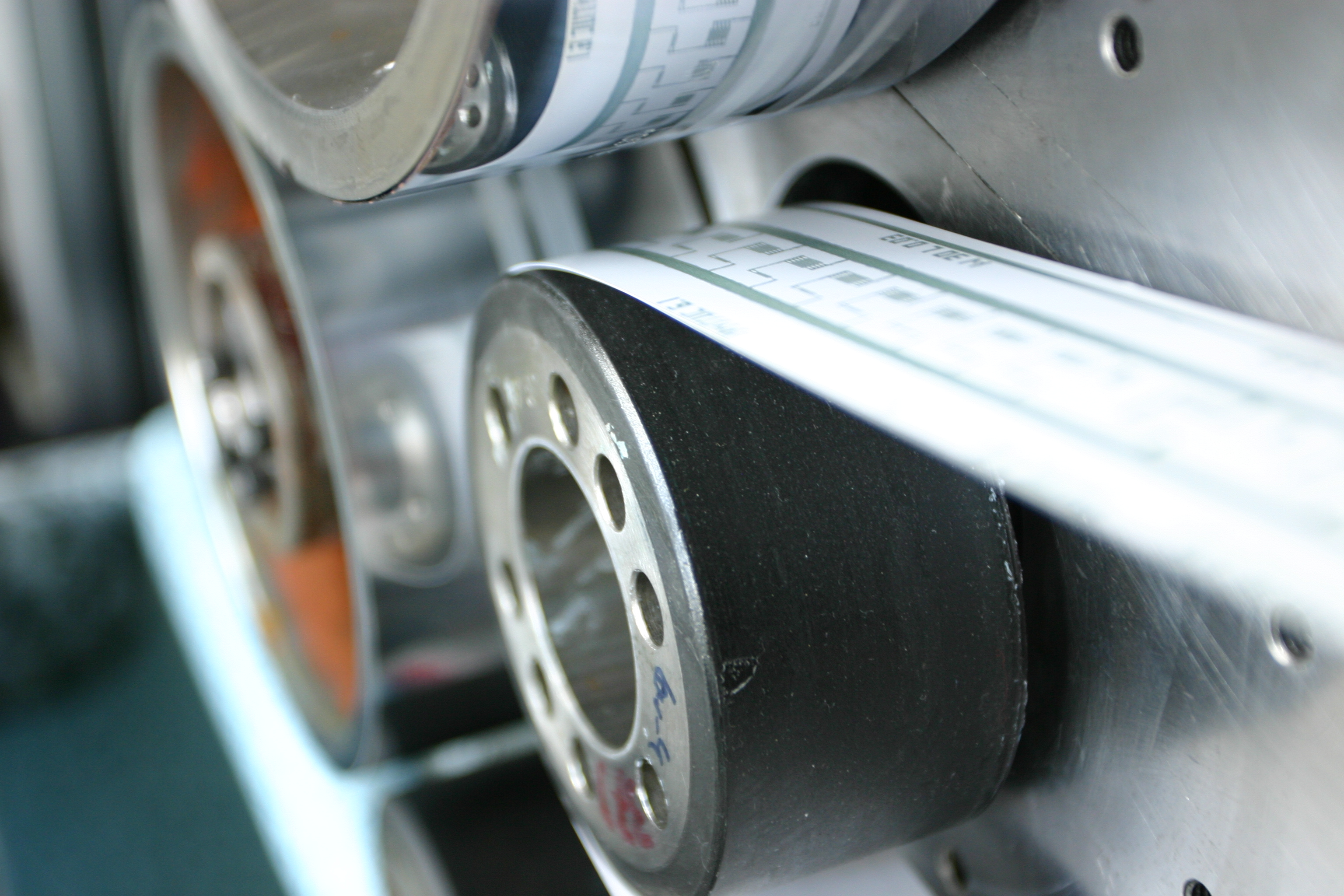
Gravure printing of electronic structures on paper

Printed electronics is a set of printing methods used to create electrical devices on various substrates. Printing typically uses common printing equipment suitable for defining patterns on material, such as screen printing, flexography, gravure, offset lithography, and inkjet. By electronic-industry standards, these are low-cost processes. Electrically functional electronic or optical inks are deposited on the substrate, creating active or passive devices, such as thin-film transistors, capacitors, coils, and resistors. Some researchers expect printed electronics to facilitate widespread, very low-cost, low-performance electronics for applications such as flexible displays, smart labels, decorative and animated posters, and active clothing that do not require high performance.

The term printed electronics is often related to organic electronics or plastic electronics, in which one or more inks are composed of carbon-based compounds. These other terms refer to the ink material, which can be deposited by solution-based, vacuum-based, or other processes. Printed electronics, in contrast, specifies the process, and, subject to the specific requirements of the printing process selected, can utilize any solution-based material. This includes organic semiconductors, inorganic semiconductors, metallic conductors, nanoparticles, and nanotubes. The solution usually consist of filler materials dispersed in a suitable solvent. The most commonly used solvents include ethanol, xylene, Dimethylformamide (DMF), Dimethyl sulfoxide (DMSO), toluene and water, whereas, the most common conductive fillers include silver nanoparticles, silver flakes, carbon black, graphene, carbon nanotubes, conductive polymers (such as polyaniline and polypyrrole), and metal powders (such as copper or nickel). Considering the environmental impacts of the organic solvents, researchers are now focused on developing printable inks using water.

For the preparation of printed electronics nearly all industrial printing methods are employed. Similar to conventional printing, printed electronics applies ink layers one atop another. So the coherent development of printing methods and ink materials are the field's essential tasks.

The most important benefit of printing is low-cost volume fabrication. The lower cost enables use in more applications. An example is RFID-systems, which enable contactless identification in trade and transport. In some domains, such as light-emitting diodes printing does not impact performance. Printing on flexible substrates allows electronics to be placed on curved surfaces, for example: printing solar cells on vehicle roofs. More typically, conventional semiconductors justify their much higher costs by providing much higher performance.

== Resolution, registration, thickness, holes, materials ==
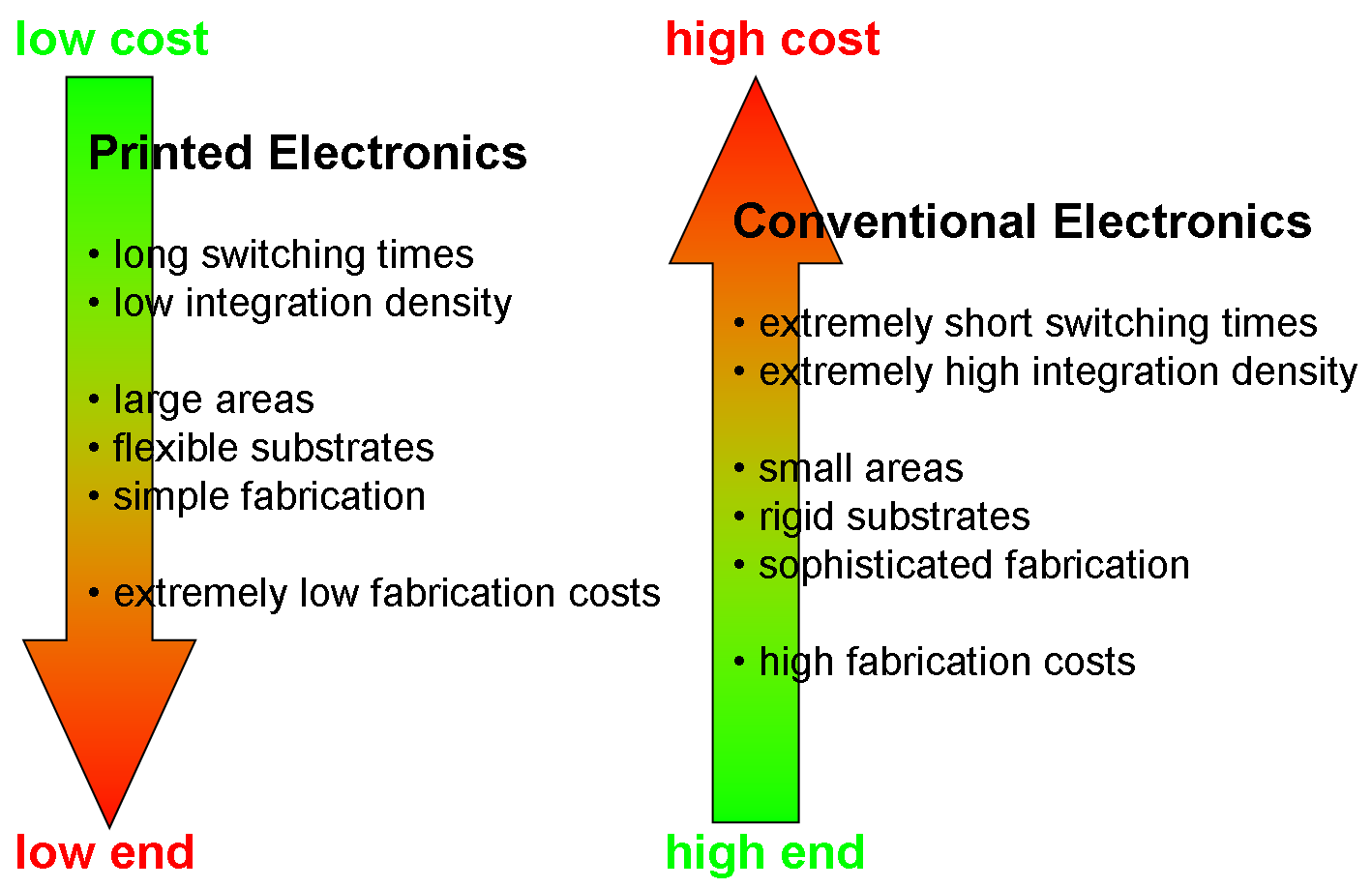
Printed and conventional electronics as complementary technologies.

The maximum required resolution of structures in conventional printing is determined by the human eye. Feature sizes smaller than approximately 20 μm cannot be distinguished by the human eye and consequently exceed the capabilities of conventional printing processes. In contrast, higher resolution and smaller structures are necessary in most electronics printing, because they directly affect circuit density and functionality (especially transistors). A similar requirement holds for the precision with which layers are printed on top of each other (layer to layer registration).

Control of thickness, holes, and material compatibility (wetting, adhesion, solubility) are essential, but matter in conventional printing only if the eye can detect them. Conversely, the visual impression is irrelevant for printed electronics.

== Printing technologies ==
The attraction of printing technology for the fabrication of electronics mainly results from the possibility of preparing stacks of micro-structured layers (and thereby thin-film devices) in a much simpler and cost-effective way compared to conventional electronics. Also, the ability to implement new or improved functionalities (e.g. mechanical flexibility) plays a role. The selection of the printing method used is determined by requirements concerning printed layers, by the properties of printed materials as well as economic and technical considerations of the final printed products.

Printing technologies divide between sheet-based and roll-to-roll-based approaches. Sheet-based inkjet and screen printing are best for low-volume, high-precision work. Gravure, offset and flexographic printing are more common for high-volume production, such as solar cells, reaching 10,000 square meters per hour (m^{2}/h). While offset and flexographic printing are mainly used for inorganic and organic conductors (the latter also for dielectrics), gravure printing is especially suitable for quality-sensitive layers like organic semiconductors and semiconductor/dielectric-interfaces in transistors, due to high layer quality. If high resolution is needed, gravure is also suitable for inorganic and organic conductors. Organic field-effect transistors and integrated circuits can be prepared completely by means of mass-printing methods.

=== Inkjet printing ===
Inkjets are flexible and versatile, and can be set up with relatively low effort. However, inkjets offer lower throughput of around 100 m^{2}/h and lower resolution (ca. 50 μm). It is well suited for low-viscosity, soluble materials like organic semiconductors. With high-viscosity materials, like organic dielectrics, and dispersed particles, like inorganic metal inks, difficulties due to nozzle clogging occur. Because ink is deposited via droplets, thickness and dispersion homogeneity is reduced. Using many nozzles simultaneously and pre-structuring the substrate allows improvements in productivity and resolution, respectively. However, in the latter case non-printing methods must be employed for the actual patterning step. Inkjet printing is preferable for organic semiconductors in organic field-effect transistors (OFETs) and organic light-emitting diodes (OLEDs), but also OFETs completely prepared by this method have been demonstrated. Frontplanes and backplanes of OLED-displays, integrated circuits, organic photovoltaic cells (OPVCs) and other devices can be prepared with inkjets.

=== Screen printing ===
Screen printing is appropriate for fabricating electrics and electronics due to its ability to produce patterned, thick layers from paste-like materials. This method can produce conducting lines from inorganic materials (e.g. for circuit boards and antennas), but also insulating and passivating layers, whereby layer thickness is more important than high resolution. Its 50 m^{2}/h throughput and 100 μm resolution are similar to inkjets. This versatile and comparatively simple method is used mainly for conductive and dielectric layers, but also organic semiconductors, e.g. for OPVCs, and even complete OFETs can be printed.

=== Aerosol jet printing ===
Aerosol Jet Printing (also known as Maskless Mesoscale Materials Deposition or M3D) is another material deposition technology for printed electronics. The Aerosol Jet process begins with atomization of an ink, via ultrasonic or pneumatic means, producing droplets on the order of one to two micrometers in diameter. The droplets then flow through a virtual impactor which deflects the droplets having lower momentum away from the stream. This step helps maintaining a tight droplet size distribution. The droplets are entrained in a gas stream and delivered to the print head. Here, an annular flow of clean gas is introduced around the aerosol stream to focus the droplets into a tightly collimated beam of material. The combined gas streams exit the print head through a converging nozzle that compresses the aerosol stream to a diameter as small as 10 μm. The jet of droplets exits the print head at high velocity (~50 meters/second) and impinges upon the substrate.

Electrical interconnects, passive and active components are formed by moving the print head, equipped with a mechanical stop/start shutter, relative to the substrate. The resulting patterns can have features ranging from 10 μm wide, with layer thicknesses from tens of nanometers to >10 μm. A wide nozzle print head enables efficient patterning of millimeter size electronic features and surface coating applications. All printing occurs without the use of vacuum or pressure chambers. The high exit velocity of the jet enables a relatively large separation between the print head and the substrate, typically 2–5 mm. The droplets remain tightly focused over this distance, resulting in the ability to print conformal patterns over three dimensional substrates.

Despite the high velocity, the printing process is gentle; substrate damage does not occur and there is generally minimal splatter or overspray from the droplets. Once patterning is complete, the printed ink typically requires post treatment to attain final electrical and mechanical properties. Post-treatment is driven more by the specific ink and substrate combination than by the printing process. A wide range of materials has been successfully deposited with the Aerosol Jet process, including diluted thick film pastes, conducting polymer inks, thermosetting polymers such as UV-curable epoxies, and solvent-based polymers like polyurethane and polyimide, and biologic materials.

Recently, printing paper was proposed to be used as the substrate of the printing. Highly conductive (close to bulk copper) and high-resolution traces can be printed on foldable and available office printing papers, with 80°Celsius curing temperature and 40 minutes of curing time.

=== Evaporation printing ===
Evaporation printing uses a combination of high precision screen printing with material vaporization to print features to 5 μm. This method uses techniques such as thermal, e-beam, sputter and other traditional production technologies to deposit materials through a high precision shadow mask (or stencil) that is registered to the substrate to better than 1 μm. By layering different mask designs and/or adjusting materials, reliable, cost-effective circuits can be built additively, without the use of photo-lithography.

=== Other methods ===
Other methods with similarities to printing, among them microcontact printing and nano-imprint lithography are of interest. Here, μm- and nm-sized layers, respectively, are prepared by methods similar to stamping with soft and hard forms, respectively. Often the actual structures are prepared subtractively, e.g. by deposition of etch masks or by lift-off processes. For example, electrodes for OFETs can be prepared. Sporadically pad printing is used in a similar manner. Occasionally so-called transfer methods, where solid layers are transferred from a carrier to the substrate, are considered printed electronics. Electrophotography is currently not used in printed electronics.

== Materials ==
Both organic and inorganic materials are used for printed electronics. Ink materials must be available in liquid form, for solution, dispersion or suspension. They must function as conductors, semiconductors, dielectrics, or insulators. Material costs must be fit for the application.

Electronic functionality and printability can interfere with each other, mandating careful optimization. For example, a higher molecular weight in polymers enhances conductivity, but diminishes solubility. For printing, viscosity, surface tension and solid content must be tightly controlled. Cross-layer interactions such as wetting, adhesion, and solubility as well as post-deposition drying procedures affect the outcome. Additives often used in conventional printing inks are unavailable, because they often defeat electronic functionality.

Material properties largely determine the differences between printed and conventional electronics. Printable materials provide decisive advantages beside printability, such as mechanical flexibility and functional adjustment by chemical modification (e.g. light color in OLEDs).

Printed conductors offer lower conductivity and charge carrier mobility.

With a few exceptions, inorganic ink materials are dispersions of metallic or semiconducting micro- and nano-particles. Semiconducting nanoparticles used include silicon and oxide semiconductors. Silicon is also printed as an organic precursor which is then converted by pyrolysis and annealing into crystalline silicon.

PMOS but not CMOS is possible in printed electronics.

=== Organic materials ===
Organic printed electronics integrates knowledge and developments from printing, electronics, chemistry, and materials science, especially from organic and polymer chemistry. Organic materials in part differ from conventional electronics in terms of structure, operation and functionality, which influences device and circuit design and optimization as well as fabrication method.

The discovery of conjugated polymers and their development into soluble materials provided the first organic ink materials. Materials from this class of polymers variously possess conducting, semiconducting, electroluminescent, photovoltaic and other properties. Other polymers are used mostly as insulators and dielectrics.

In most organic materials, hole transport is favored over electron transport. Recent studies indicate that this is a specific feature of organic semiconductor/dielectric-interfaces, which play a major role in OFETs. Therefore, p-type devices should dominate over n-type devices. Durability (resistance to dispersion) and lifetime is less than conventional materials.

Organic semiconductors include the conductive polymers poly(3,4-ethylene dioxitiophene), doped with poly(styrene sulfonate), (PEDOT:PSS) and poly(aniline) (PANI). Both polymers are commercially available in different formulations and have been printed using inkjet, screen and offset printing or screen, flexo and gravure printing, respectively.

Polymer semiconductors are processed using inkjet printing, such as poly(thiopene)s like poly(3-hexylthiophene) (P3HT) and poly(9,9-dioctylfluorene co-bithiophen) (F8T2). The latter material has also been gravure printed. Different electroluminescent polymers are used with inkjet printing, as well as active materials for photovoltaics (e.g. blends of P3HT with fullerene derivatives), which in part also can be deposited using screen printing (e.g. blends of poly(phenylene vinylene) with fullerene derivatives).

Printable organic and inorganic insulators and dielectrics exist, which can be processed with different printing methods.

=== Inorganic materials ===
Inorganic electronics provides highly ordered layers and interfaces that organic and polymer materials cannot provide.

Silver nanoparticles are used with flexo, offset and inkjet. Gold particles are used with inkjet.

A.C. electroluminescent (EL) multi-color displays can cover many tens of square meters, or be incorporated in watch faces and instrument displays. They involve six to eight printed inorganic layers, including a copper doped phosphor, on a plastic film substrate.

CIGS cells can be printed directly onto molybdenum coated glass sheets.

A printed gallium arsenide germanium solar cell demonstrated 40.7% conversion efficiency, eight times that of the best organic cells, approaching the best performance of crystalline silicon.

=== Substrates ===
Printed electronics allows the use of flexible substrates, which lowers production costs and allows fabrication of mechanically flexible circuits. While inkjet and screen printing typically imprint rigid substrates like glass and silicon, mass-printing methods nearly exclusively use flexible foil and paper. Poly(ethylene terephthalate)-foil (PET) is a common choice, due to its low cost and moderately high temperature stability. Poly(ethylene naphthalate)- (PEN) and poly(imide)-foil (PI) are higher performance, higher cost alternatives. Paper's low costs and manifold applications make it an attractive substrate, however, its high roughness and high wettability have traditionally made it problematic for electronics. This is an active research area, however, and print-compatible metal deposition techniques have been demonstrated that adapt to the rough 3D surface geometry of paper.

Other important substrate criteria are low roughness and suitable wet-ability, which can be tuned pre-treatment by use of coating or Corona discharge. In contrast to conventional printing, high absorbency is usually disadvantageous.

== History ==
Albert Hanson, a German by birth, is credited to have introduced the concept of printed electronics. in 1903 he filled a patent for "Printed Wires," and thus printed electronics were born. Hanson proposed forming a Printed Circuit Board pattern on copper foil through cutting or stamping. The drawn elements were glued to the dielectric, in this case, paraffined paper. The first printed circuit was produced in 1936 by Paul Eisler, and that process was used for large-scale production of radios by the USA during World War II. Printed circuit technology was released for commercial use in the US in 1948 (Printed Circuits Handbook, 1995). In the over a half-century since its inception, printed electronics has evolved from the production of printed circuit boards (PCBs), through the everyday use of membrane switches, to today's RFID, photovoltaic and electroluminescent technologies. Today it is nearly impossible to look around a modern American household and not see devices that either uses printed electronic components or that are the direct result of printed electronic technologies. Widespread production of printed electronics for household use began in the 1960s when the Printed Circuit Board became the foundation for all consumer electronics. Since then printed electronics have become a cornerstone in many new commercial products.

The biggest trend in recent history when it comes to printed electronics is the widespread use of them in solar cells. In 2011, researchers from MIT created a flexible solar cell by inkjet printing on normal paper. In 2018, researchers at Rice University have developed organic solar cells which can be painted or printed onto surfaces. These solar cells have been shown to max out at fifteen percent efficiency. Konarka Technologies, now a defunct company in the US, was the pioneering company in producing inkjet solar cells. Today there are more than fifty companies across a diverse number of countries that are producing printed solar cells.

While printed electronics have been around since the 1960s, they are predicted to have a major boom in total revenue. As of 2011, the total printed electronic revenue was reported to be at $12.385 (billion). A report by IDTechEx predicts the PE market will reach $330 (billion) in 2027. A big reason for this increase in revenue is because of the incorporation of printed electronic into cellphones. Nokia was one of the companies that pioneered the idea of creating a "Morph" phone using printed electronics. Since then, Apple has implemented this technology into their iPhone XS, XS Max, and XR devices. Printed electronics can be used to make all of the following components of a cellphone: 3D main antenna, GPS antenna, energy storage, 3D interconnections, multi-layer PCB, edge circuits, ITO jumpers, hermetic seals, LED packaging, and tactile feedback.

With the revolutionary discoveries and advantages that printed electronic gives to companies many large companies have made recent investments into this technology. In 2007, Soligie Inc. and Thinfilm Electronics entered into an agreement to combine IPs for soluble memory materials and functional materials printing to develop printed memory in commercial volumes. LG announce significant investment, potentially $8.71 billion in OLEDs on Plastic. Sharp (Foxconn) will invest $570m in pilot line for OLED displays. BOE announce potential $6.8 billion in flexible AMOLED fab. Heliatek has secured €80m in additional funding for OPV manufacturing in Dresden. PragmatIC has raised ~ €20m from investors including Avery Dennison. Thinfilm invests in new production site in Silicon Valley (formerly owned by Qualcomm). Cambrios back in business after acquisition by TPK.

== Applications ==
Printed electronics in use or under consideration include wireless sensors in packaging, skin patches that communicate with the internet, and buildings that detect leaks to enable preventative maintenance. Most of these applications are still in the prototyping and development stages. There is a growing interest in flexible smart electronic systems, including photovoltaic, sensing and processing devices, with the goal of extending and integrating the latest advances in (opto-)electronic technologies into a broad range of low-cost (or disposable) everyday consumer products.

Norwegian company ThinFilm demonstrated roll-to-roll printed organic memory in 2009.

Another company, Rotimpres based in Spain, has successfully introduced applications on different markets as for instance; heaters for smart furniture or to prevent mist and capacitive switch for keyboards on white goods and industrial machines.

== Standards development and activities ==
Technical standards and road-mapping initiatives are intended to facilitate value chain development (for sharing of product specifications, characterization standards, etc.) This strategy of standards development mirrors the approach used by silicon-based electronics over the past 50 years. Initiatives include:

- The IEEE Standards Association has published IEEE 1620-2004 and IEEE 1620.1-2006.
- Similar to the well-established International Technology Roadmap for Semiconductors (ITRS), the International Electronics Manufacturing Initiative (iNEMI) has published a roadmap for printed and other organic electronics.

IPC—Association Connecting Electronics Industries has published three standards for printed electronics. All three have been published in cooperation with the Japan Electronic Packaging and Circuits Association (JPCA):

- IPC/JPCA-4921, Requirements for Printed Electronics Base Materials
- IPC/JPCA-4591, Requirements for Printed Electronics Functional Conductive Materials
- IPC/JPCA-2291, Design Guideline for Printed Electronics

These standards, and others in development, are part of IPC's Printed Electronics Initiative.

== See also ==
- Amorphous silicon
- Anilox rolls
- Chip tag
- Coating and printing processes
- Conductive ink
- Electronic paper
- Flexible battery
- Flexible electronics
- Laminar electronics
- Nanoparticle silicon
- Oligomer
- Organic electronics
