= Egg carton =

Type of packaging for eggs

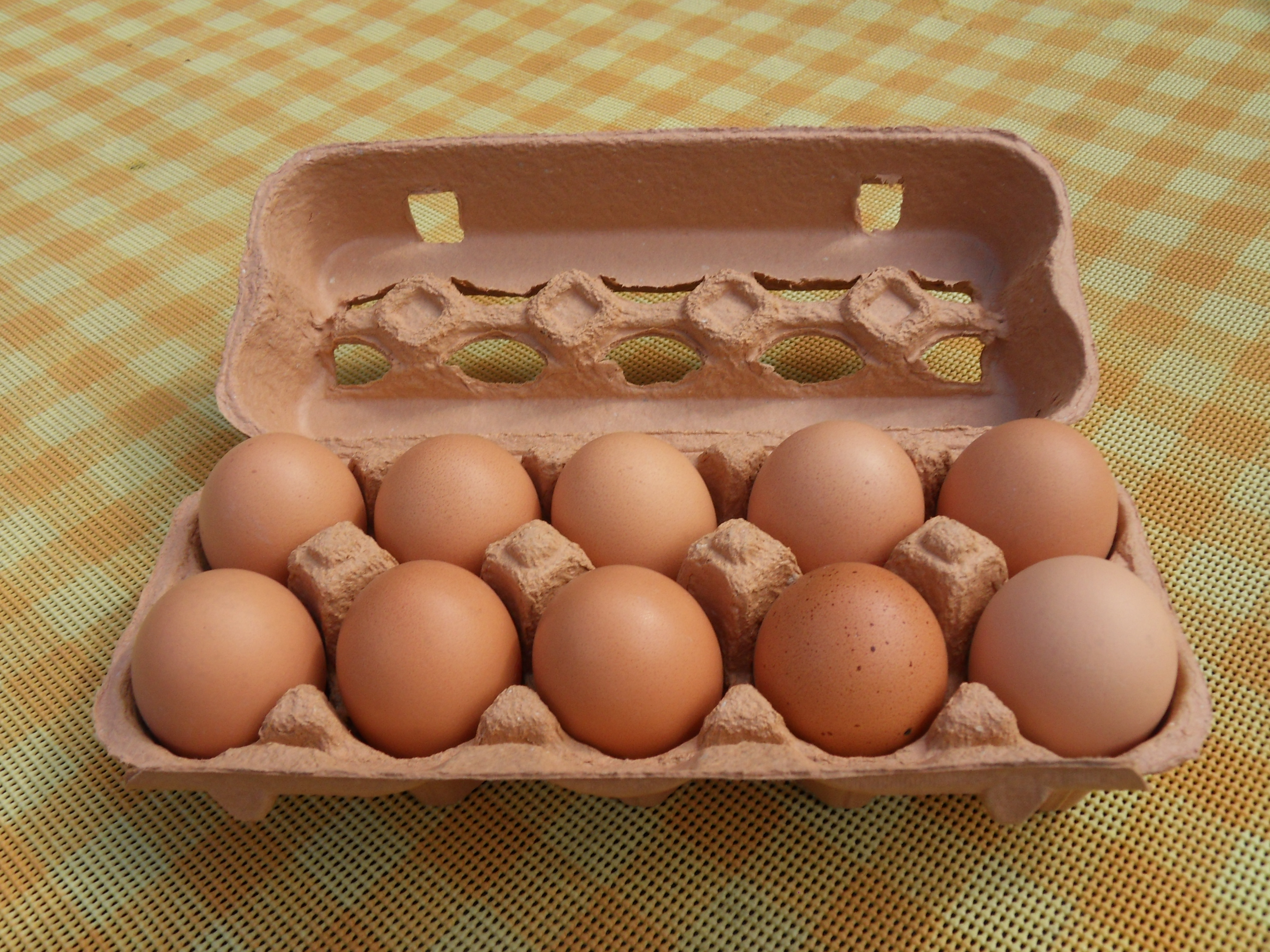
A molded pulp egg carton with ten eggs

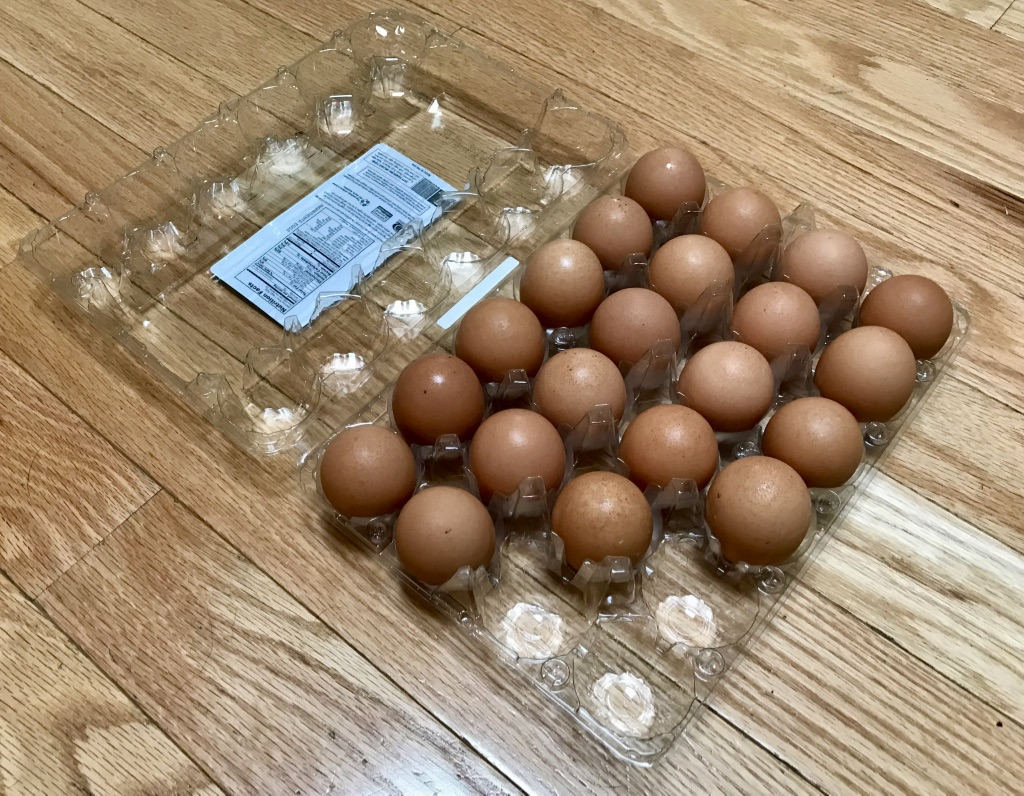
PETE plastic egg carton for 24 eggs

An egg carton (also known as an egg box in British English) is a carton designed for carrying and transporting whole eggs.

== Description ==
These cartons have a dimpled form in which each dimple accommodates an individual egg and isolates that egg from eggs in adjacent dimples. This structure helps protect eggs against stresses exerted during transportation and storage by absorbing much shock and limiting the incidents of fracture to the fragile egg shells. An egg carton can be made of various materials, including foamed plastics such as polystyrene foam, clear plastic or may be manufactured from recycled paper and molded pulp by means of a mechanized papier-mâché process.

== Origins ==
Before its invention, eggs were carried in egg baskets. In 1906, Thomas Peter Bethell of Liverpool invented a predecessor to the modern egg box and marketed it as the Raylite Egg Box. He created frames of interlocking strips of cardboard, and packed these frames in cardboard or wooden boxes for transport by road or rail.

In 1911, newspaper editor Joseph Coyle of Smithers, British Columbia, invented the egg carton, to solve a dispute between a local farmer, Gabriel LaCroix, and hotel owner in Aldermere, near present-day Telkwa, in British Columbia, over the farmer's eggs often being delivered broken.

In 1921, Morris Koppelman patented an improved version of the egg carton made from cut, folded and glued cardboard and functions similar to today's egg cartons. The patent emphasized the ability for it to fold flat after use, which is a feature no longer considered important.

In 1931, American Francis H Sherman of Palmer, Massachusetts, patented an egg carton formed with pressed paper pulp that is recognizable as the modern egg carton used today.

In the 1950s, British designer H.G Bennett, working for manufacturing company Hartmann, adapted the egg tray design to include a sealable lid, to allow for easy stacking and transportation of 6 or 12 eggs. These are the egg boxes still seen in supermarkets today.

In the 1960s, Japanese businessman Mamoru Kamo, founder of what is now FPico Dia Foods, developed a transparent plastic egg pack with octagonal pyramidal compartments that supported the eggs above the bottom of the container. The design reduced breakage when cartons were stacked. His design is still widely used in Japan.

In 2000, the United Industrial Syndicate (UIS) in Maine (a division of The Portland Company) patented an egg carton appears similar to Sherman's pressed paper pulp carton but has special pedestals formed into the carton to provide support for the weight of stacks of egg cartons and other strength related features and also an improved clasping closure feature. The four inventors listed on the filing are Walter H. Howarth, Gerald A. Snow, Micah J. Yates, and Harold A. Doughty.

== Sizes ==
Standard egg cartons have room for 10 or 12 eggs, but they can come in a variety of sizes, holding from one to 30 eggs.

Trays are usually used to store fresh eggs from farms or at farmers' markets. Plastic egg trays are also used by egg processors to wash and sanitize eggs. A cardboard sleeve or additional trays are used to protect eggs when using a tray format.
