= Liaghra =

Scottish knitting tool

The liaghra was a tool used in Scottish knitting, especially in the north west, and Argyll. It had various regional names, and is sometimes known in English as a thread winder.

It consisted of two sticks crossed together in the centre and set on a swivel pin in a block of wood called the stoc. A pin of wood is fixed in each of the four extremities of the sticks, and round thus, a hank of thread is placed, which is unravelled and made into a ball, as the operator spins the instrument round.

== Regional names ==
- Crann tachrais – Various
- Na Sgiathan (the wings) – Caithness
- Bodach-sgiathan (Old man of the wings) – Sutherland
- Eachan (Horsie) – Argyll
- Crois-lionradh – Lewis
