= Converter (industry) =

Specialist in combining raw materials to create new products

A converter is a company that specializes in modifying or combining raw materials such as polyesters, adhesives, silicone, adhesive tapes, foams, plastics, felts, rubbers, liners and metals, as well as other materials, to create new products.

Materials such as paper, plastic film, foil and cloth often are produced in long, continuous sheets that are rolled up for more convenient handling and transportation. These rolls of material vary significantly in size and weight—ranging from 2–203 inches (5–516 cm) wide and weighing as much as several tons. The converting industry takes these continuous rolls of thin, flat materials—known as webs—threads them through processing machines (such as printing presses, laminating, coating and slitting machines) and converts or changes the web of material into an intermediate form or final product. For example, a converter's equipment might take a web of plastic film, cut it into lengths, and fuse their edges, thus converting it into plastic bags. This activity is known as web processing.

== Processes ==
Typical converting processes include coating, laminating and printing. Coating technologies can include hot melt coating, gravure coating, curtain coating and slot-die coating. The most common printing techniques are flexo printing and rotogravure (gravure) printing. Both print processes are suited to high speed roll-to-roll processing.

Many converting companies will process large diameter, wide rolls of material as this increases the converting efficiency by minimising changes. On completion of the converting process the rolls may be cut into smaller rolls on a slitting machine or a sheeter. These rolls or sheets are then a convenient size for handling on packaging and other machines. Further processes such as collation may occur after sheeting.

Depending on the specially of the converter, many other processes might be involved. These might include: shearing, die-cutting, laser cutting, heat sealing, laser converting, perforating, ultrasonic welding, surface finishing, etc.

== Web alignment ==
When converting from rolls of material, web alignment is an important part of a converting operation as a moving web of material has a tendency to track off course and wander out of alignment during the converting processes. To avoid these problems, engineers have developed a variety of automatic web-guiding systems that assure production accuracy and reduce waste. Web-guiding systems typically are positioned just before a critical stage on a converting machine (for example, just before a print station on a printing press).

Each type of web guiding system uses a sensor to monitor the web position for lateral tracking, and each has an actuator to shift the running web mechanically back on course whenever the sensor detects movement away from the set path. Actuators may be pneumatic or hydraulic cylinders, or some kind of electromechanical device. Because the web may be fragile — particularly at its edge — non-contact sensors are used. These sensors may be pneumatic, photoelectric, ultrasonic, or infrared. The system's controls must put the output signals from the sensors in to a form that can drive the actuator. Many controls today are electronic, typically using an amplifier to convert signals from the sensor, then commanding a special servo motor incorporating a lead or ball screw for guiding actuation. The latest web guiding systems have touch screen controls to simplify the setup procedure. Some web guiding systems have been designed specifically for the converting industry.

== Services ==
Many converters specialize in

- Adhesive coating to make labels and adhesive tape
- Silicone coating to make a release liner
- Die-cutting materials into finished parts or labels
- Printing services
- Roll slitting of wide webs into narrow webs, rolls, sheets, or coils
- Laminating services
- Vacuum forming

== Newer technology ==
Some converting companies now incorporate electronics in their finished products. For example, converters producing RFID stock labels must incorporate RFID chips and antenna inlays. The electronic components make up the RFID tag. The tag stores the information about the items that have been tagged. These converters therefore sometimes incorporate volume electronics manufacturing practices including controlling static electricity, electronic manufacturing test and similar processes. Solving some of the issues of inclusion of materials sensitive to external influences has led to more tech companies embracing roll-based manufacturing processes, with particular success in the lithium ion and solar cell manufacturing sectors.

== Paper converting ==
Paper converting can refer to manufacturing processes involving paper as the raw material. This raw material, similar to other converting industries, can be in a roll or sheet form. Paper converting is required for the manufacture of nearly all paper based products, such as magazines, books, newspapers, labels, bags, and general purpose paper products.

The process of processing pre-cut cartons or "blanks" and folding them into the appropriate shape to become finished packaging containers is known as tray forming or carton erecting. This is a specific example of a type of converting. These machines can create, for example, nacho trays, Chinese noodle soup boxes, pizza boxes, french fry trays, hamburger clamshells, etc.

== See also ==
- Converting (magazine)
- Cutting stock problem
- Roll-to-roll processing
- Contract manufacturing organization
