= Drink carrier =

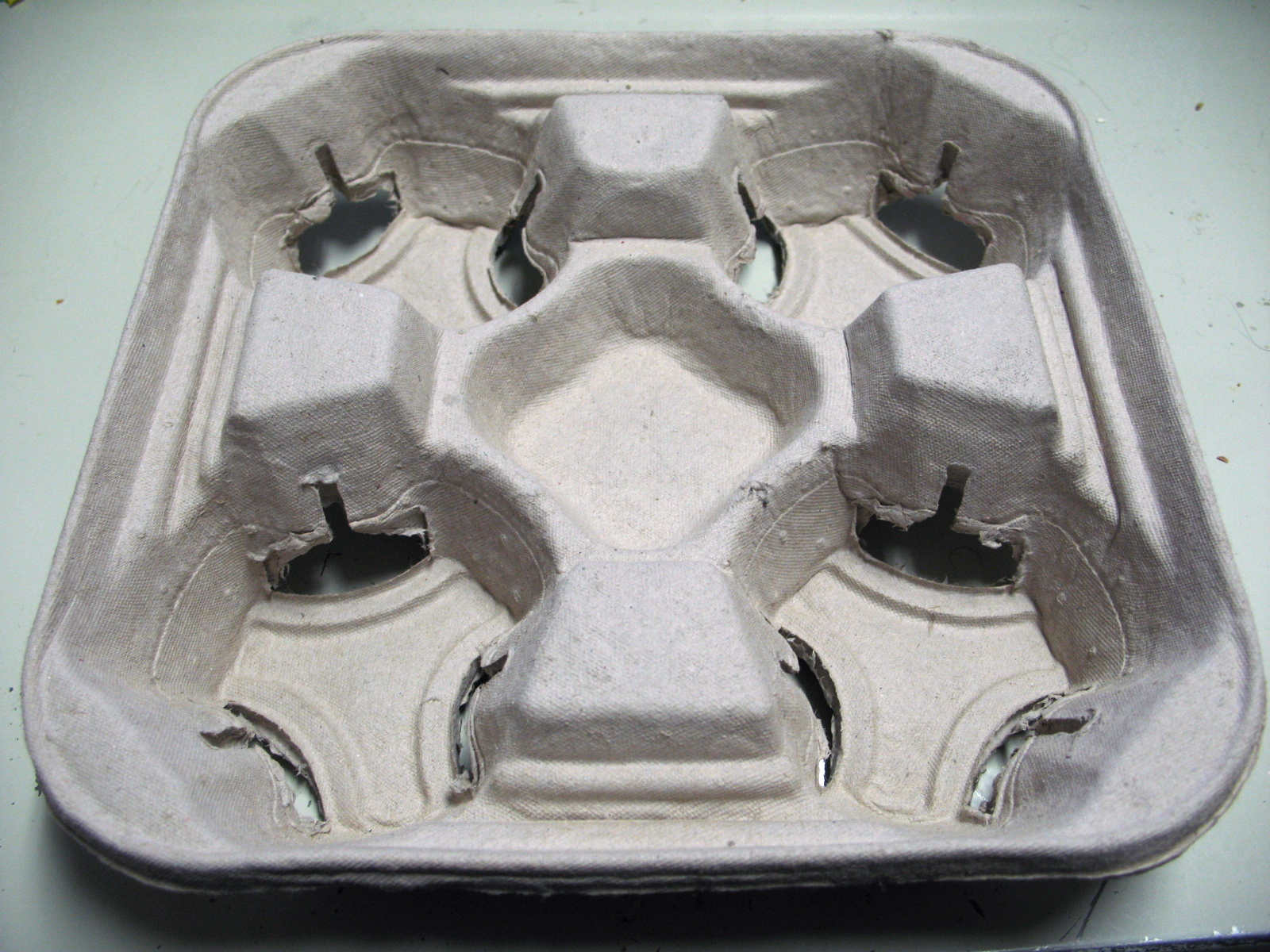
A McDonald's molded paper pulp drink carrier.

A drink carrier, sometimes also known as a cup carrier, beverage carrier or cup holder is a device used to carry multiple filled beverage cups at the same time.

There are many different designs for drink carriers, but they commonly include relatively deep indentations, holes, or compartments into which the cups are placed. This keeps the drinks from falling over during transport, and distinguishes drink carriers from cafeteria trays, though both may be used to carry both drinks and food.

Customized Double Cup Carrier

Drink carriers may be made from paperboard, molded pulp, plastic or other materials. Paperboard carriers can be die-cut and folded from a flat sheet, while molded-fiber carriers are formed into a three-dimensional shape. Paperboard carriers are available in different basis weights depending on their construction and intended load. For example, molded-kraft single-cup and double-cup carriers are available in a basis weight of 300 g/m² (GSM).

== See also ==
- Cup holder
- Coffee cup sleeve
- Juicebox (container)
- Multi-pack of beverage packaging
- Disposable food packaging
