= Roll slitting =

Shearing operation

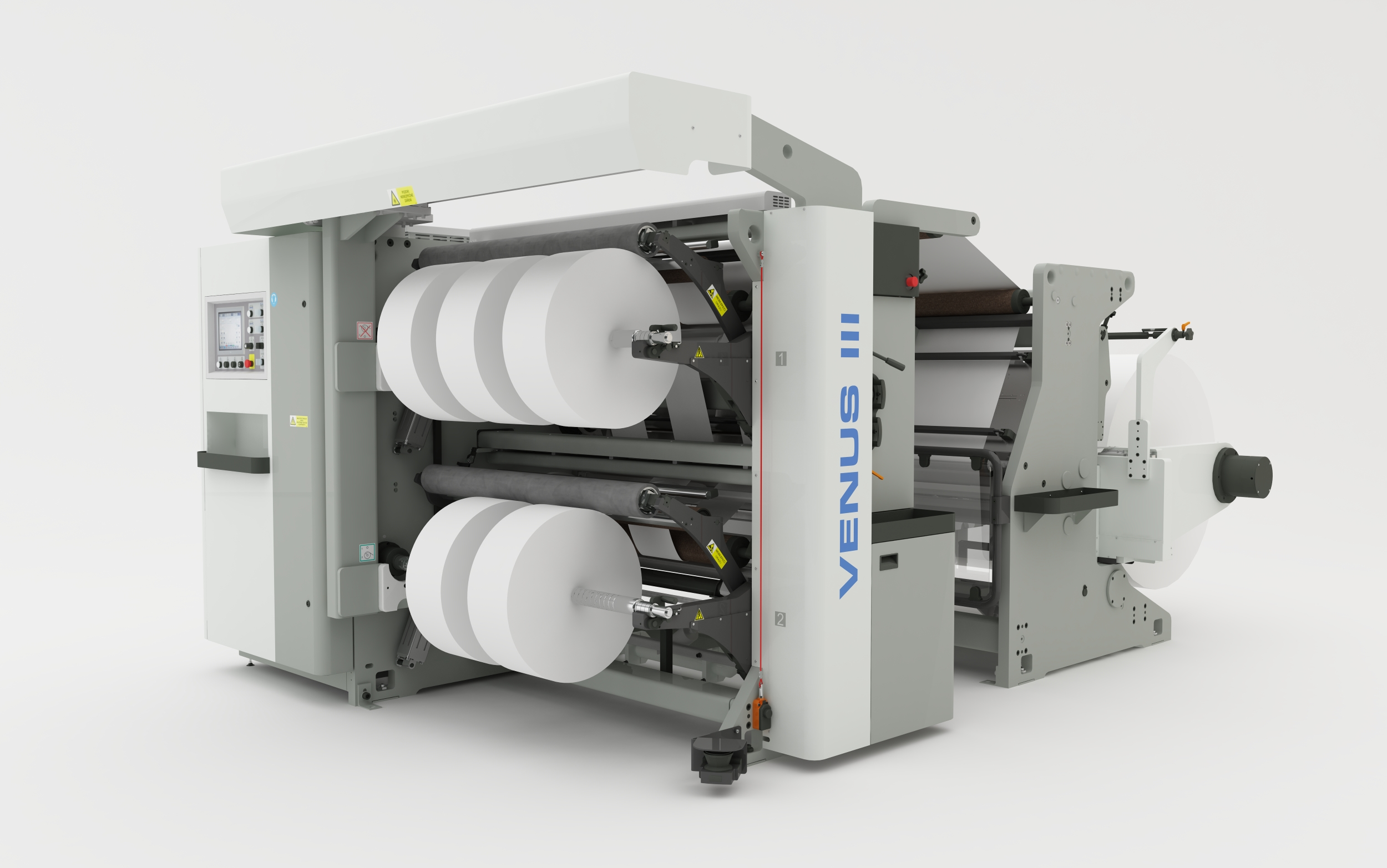
Slitter rewinder

Roll slitting is a shearing operation that cuts a large roll of material into narrower rolls. There are two types of slitting: log slitting and rewind slitting. In log slitting, the roll of material is treated as a whole (the 'log') and one or more slices are taken from it without an unrolling/re-reeling process. In rewind slitting, the web is unwound and run through the machine, passing through knives or lasers, before being rewound on one or more shafts to form narrower rolls. The multiple narrower strips of material may be known as mults (short for multiple) or pancakes if their diameter is much more than their width.

For log slitting, the machine used is called a paper roll saw, which typically uses a circular saw or band saw to cut rolls into narrower ones. For rewind slitting, the machine used is called a slitter rewinder, a slitter, or a slitting machine – these names are used interchangeably for the same machines. "Slitting" refers to the process of industrial cutting the material web in a lengthwise direction, while "cutting" refers to both lengthwise and crosswise cutting operations. The roll slitting machine is called a slitter or slitter-rewinder, rather than a cutter, due to this distinction. For particularly narrow and thin products, the pancakes become unstable, and then the rewind may be onto a bobbin-wound reel: the rewind bobbins are much wider than the slit width, and the web oscillates across the reel as it is rewound. Apart from the stability benefit, it is also possible to put very long lengths (frequently many tens of kilometres) onto one bobbin.

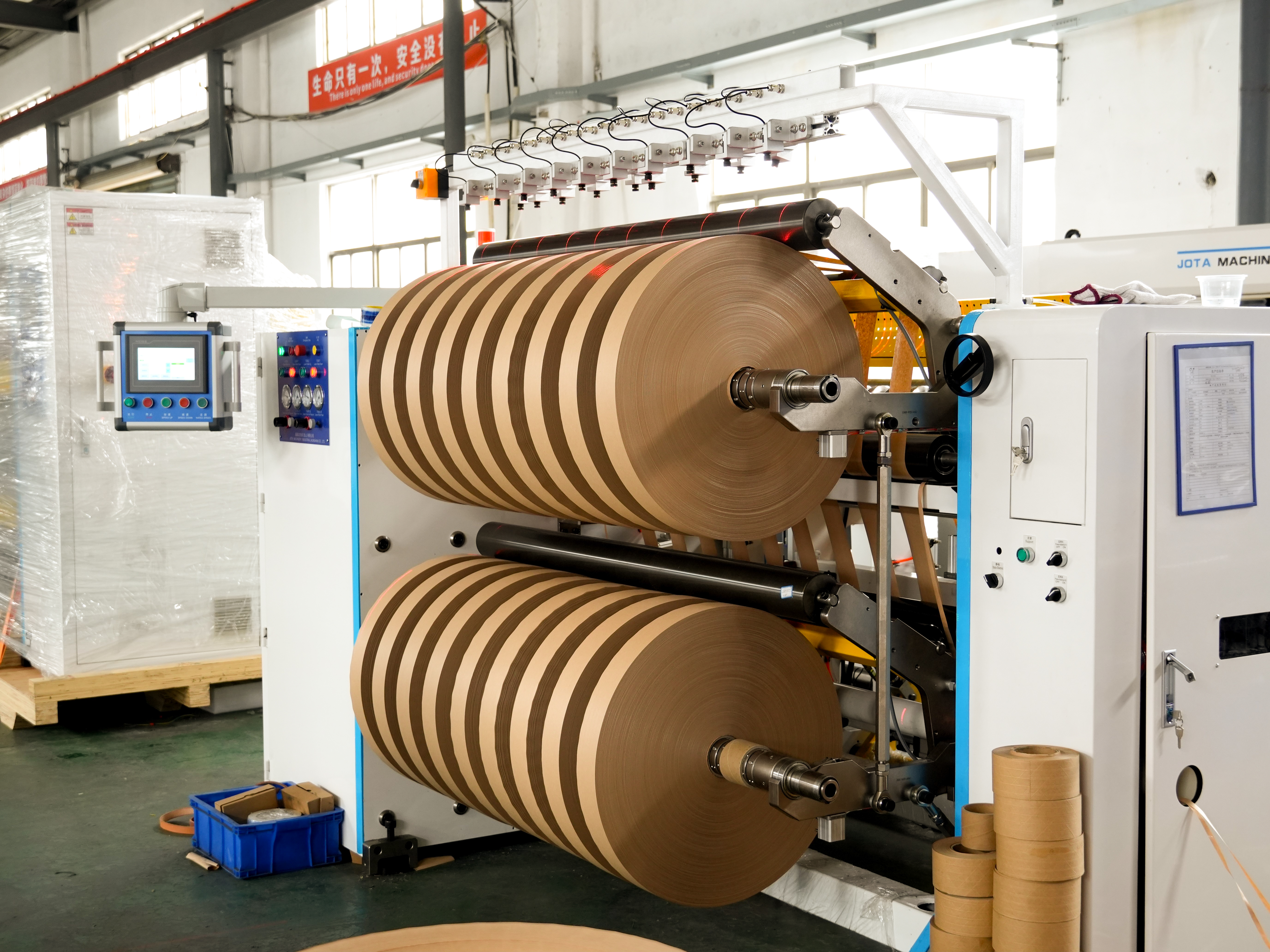
Dual Shaft Slitting machine

== Process ==
=== Soft materials ===
Several methods are available for soft materials like plastic films, textiles, adhesive tapes, and paper. Razor blades, straight, or circular blades are being used. Some blades cut through the material while others crush the material against a hard roll. Those are similar to knives. The cutting blades can be set to a desired width. Some machines have many blades and can produce a number of output rolls at once. The slit material is rewound on paper, plastic or metal cores on the exit side of the machine.

The process is used because of its low cost and high precision for mass production. Some machines have a program that monitors the blades and sharpens the blades often to maintain the quality and precision of the cut. Depending on the industry and the product that is being slit these machine can run between 10m/min (special metal webs) and 1000 m/min (paper making process). The machines can also incorporate extensive automation to precisely control material tension, automatically position the slitting knives, automatically align the cores onto which the material is wound and to reduce manual handling of the rolls.

Examples of materials that can be cut this way are: adhesive tape, foam, rubber, paper products, foil, plastics (such as tarps and cling wrap), glass cloth, fabrics, release liner and film.

=== Hard materials ===
For harder materials, such as sheet metal, blades cannot be used. Instead, a modified form of shearing is used. Two cylindrical rolls with matching ribs and grooves are used to cut a large roll into multiple narrower rolls. This continuous production process is economical yet precise; usually more precise than most other cutting processes. However, the occurrence of rough edges known as burrs is commonplace on slit edges. Also, the geometry of these rolls is determined by specific tolerances in addition to the type of material and workpiece thickness.

=== Machinery ===
For metal coils, the slitter consists of three main parts: an uncoiler, slitter, and recoiler. The material is fed from the uncoiler, through the nip between the two circular cutting wheels (one on top and another underneath), and then re-wound in slit pieces on the recoiler.

When the term "slitter rewinder" or "slitting machine" is used to describe the machine, the three parts are referred to as the unwind, the slitting section and the rewind. Slitter rewinders are normally used to slit plastic films, paper and metal foils. The unwind stage holds the roll stably and allows it to spin; it is either braked or driven to maintain accurate tension in the material. Some machines have a driven unwind which reduces the effect of inertia when starting to unwind heavy rolls or when the material is very tension-sensitive.

The slitting section has four main options:

- Razor slitting, which is ideal for thin plastic films—the system is very simple and quick to set. Although the razor blades are of low cost, they need to be frequently changed to ensure a good quality slit edge.
- Rotary shear slitting. Male and female circular knives, or as they are also called, top and bottom shear-cut knives, engage to give a scissor cutting effect. This system is used widely on paper, films and foils. Although the knives take longer to position, they stay sharp longer than razor blades. The setting time can be reduced by using an automatic knife-positioning system.
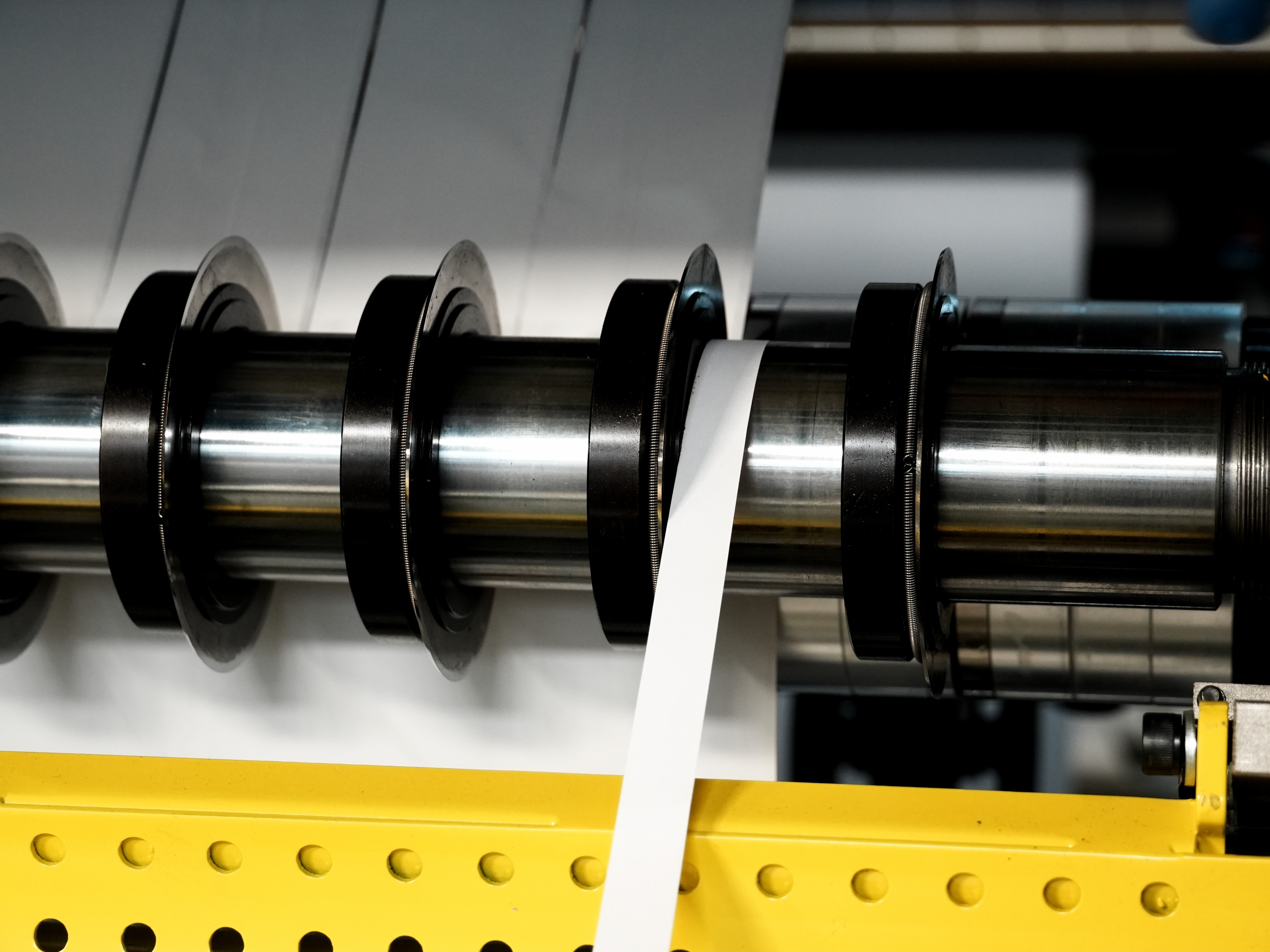
  Rotatry blade
- Crush cut slitting. A male knife runs against an anvil. The system works well with certain materials including non-wovens and foams.
- Hot knife slitting. A heated round blade (similar to a score or crush cut blade) or sharpened piece of metal also runs against an anvil in order to cut through the material. The heat of the blade seals the edges without burning in order to prevent the material from fraying.

The rewind section also has options. The main type is centre winding using differential rewind shafts. These shafts are becoming universal on most slitting machines. The differential shafts ensure an even tension across the full width of the material. Closed-loop control of the winding tension using feedback from load cells provides the total tension-control system required for running tension-sensitive materials. Precise and accurate tension control is the key to good roll slitting. Modern machines use AC vector drives with closed-loop feedback from AC motors. When used with the correct control algorithms, they produce excellent results with the minimum of maintenance.

=== Industry usage ===
Roll slitting is a technique heavily used by converters. The converter industry normally refers to companies who print, coat and laminate materials. A typical converter is a company that produces flexible packaging material for packaging food. This may involve purchasing large rolls of plastic film such as biaxially orientated polypropylene (BOPP) which is then printed to the customer's design and coated with cold seal adhesive for use on high speed packaging machines. This material is printed and coated in wide, large diameter rolls for maximum efficiency. The rolls are then slit, using a slitting machine, into smaller rolls of the size to be used on the packaging machine.

== See also ==
- Web (manufacturing)
- Cutting stock problem
