= Latch seal =

Security mechanism

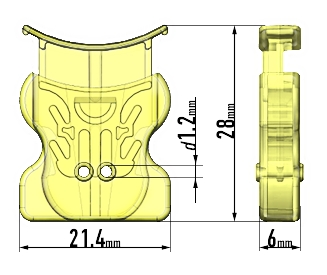
Latch seal size

A latch seal is a product which helps limit access to private facilities for people without permits. А high level of strength plastic is used for the manufacture of seals. In order to protect are used the unique number which is applied to the case and closing security seal design (an insert). There are various options for the application of a unique number: laser marking (you can't change the number or erase), pad printing, engraving.

== Advantages ==
The great advantage of the seals is the lack of need to buy special equipment because the installation is done manually and does not require the involvement of professionals. The case eliminates the possibility of hacking, without visible damage. Seals are relevant for use in different temperature regimes (higher than the ambient temperature). They do not respond to the influence of ultraviolet rays, the color and structure of the material remain unchanged. The compact dimensions suitable for use in hard to reach places.

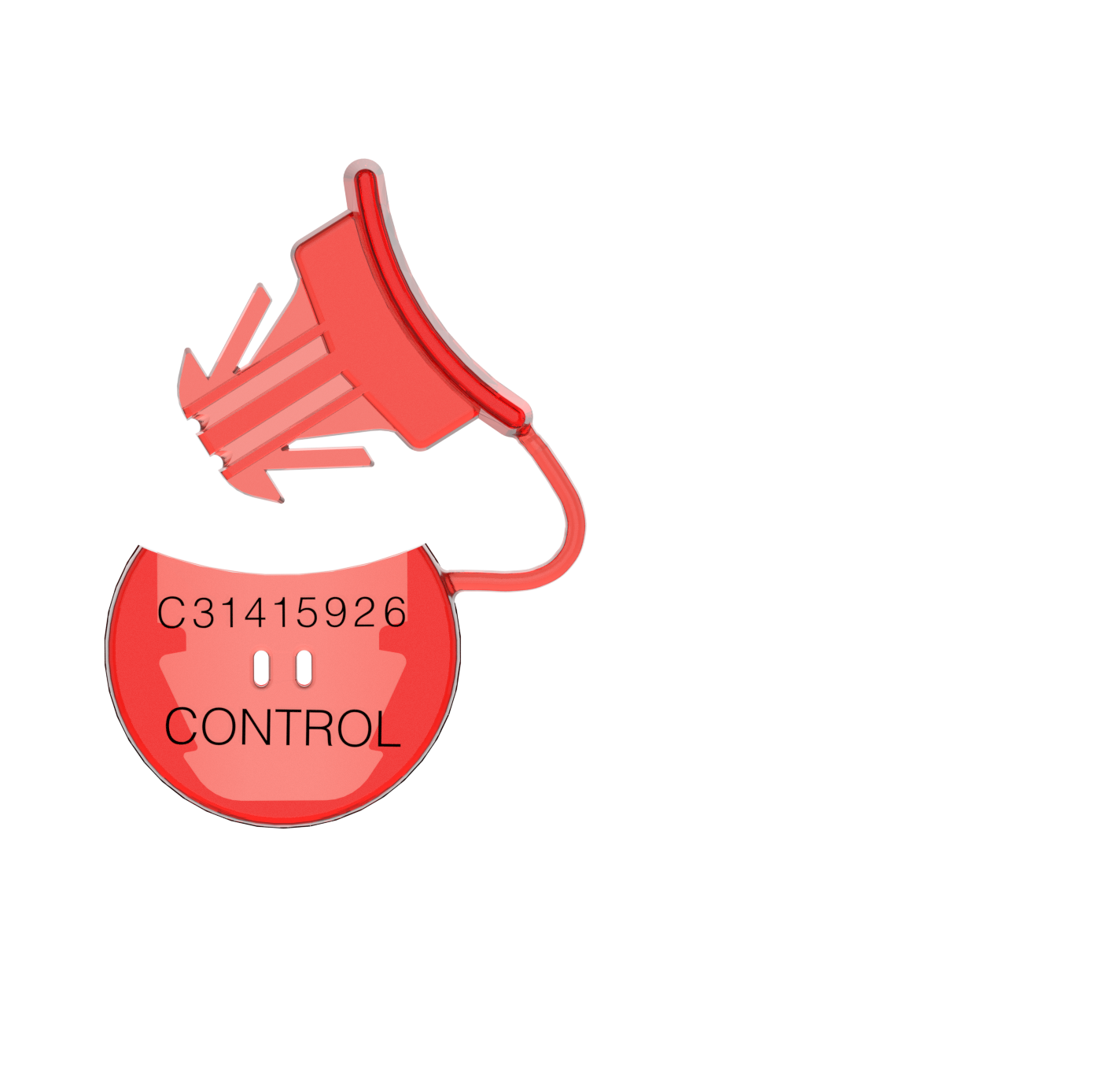
Latch seal GST

== Types and methods of application ==
Latch seals may be monolithic and consist of several elements (a case and the insert). For sealing is used the sealing wire. The case color and the insert can be of the same color or different colors. The operating principle is simple. Insert is fixed inside the body due to the special design of both elements, which does not allow re-extract the insert from the casing without visible traces or without damage. The design often resembles the shape of an anchor. Basic elements of protection - seal number, material that should leave traces tamper, additional elements such as a thermal indicator of attempts to heat.

== Areas of application latch seals ==
Areas of application latch seals:

- 1. In the production.

Offices, workshops, workplaces and even machines, devices of accounting and control, emergency communication channels and conveyors in the state of conservation can be sealed.

- 2. In the monetary and banking sector.

For the sealing of safes, cash containers and collectors bags. Storage of cash and valuables.

- 3. On transport.

Latch seals are convenient type of sealing devices - installed quickly and simply, which is particularly valuable in the conditions of large number of objects. Especially considering their special indicator ability for opening attempts.

The benefits of the use of latch seals are in many times greater than any costs for their acquisition. This is an effective way to prevent theft, fraud and interference in the work of the mechanisms and instruments.
