= Chimigraf =

Spanish company

Chimigraf Ibérica
- Founded: 1970 in Hospitalet de Llobregat, Barcelona
- Founder: Orazio Samoggia
- Area served: Worldwide
- Products: Flexographic ink water-based ink solvent ink
- Divisions: Packaging, Relief printing
- Website: www.chimigraf.com

Chimigraf is a Spanish multinational company engaged in the production of inks for flexography, rotogravure, digital systems, and screen printing. It has its own technology in the development of ink-jet inks. It has a presence in over 40 countries around the world.

== History ==
It was founded in 1970 in the municipality of l'Hospitalet de Llobregat by Orazio Samoggia an Italian businessman well known in the printing industry.

From 1970 to 1980 the company grew to occupy a significant position in the field of polyamide flexographic inks.

In 1986, six years after moving its facilities to the town of Rubí near Barcelona, the company sharply increased its market position creating a new factory for the production of pigment dispersion chips and later, a special section dedicated to the growing market for water-based flexographic inks.

Chimigraf was introduced in other markets such as France, South America, North Africa and Eastern Europe.

In 1985 the factories were opened in Valencia and Madrid.

In the year 2000 it entered the digital ink market, creating a new structure for the manufacture of ink-jet inks.

Chimigraf Ibérica has its own technology in the field of DOD ink-jet.2 ink, solvents, oil, or curing UV.

Participation as an exhibitor at the first MINIMIZAR trade fair organised by the Observatory for the Environment, the purpose of which is to promote technologies, products and processes to reduce waste.

2012, vice catalonia cluster of food packaging.

== Awards ==
- 2006 - Oscar for Packaging – Chimigraf's Omniflex series of solvent-based liquid inks were certified as compostable/biodegradable, and the use of these materials was awarded this prize to manufacturers packaging Saint André Plastique and to Chimigraf for their inks.
- 2007 HP Platinum Winner – Manufacturing
