= Anilox =

Method to provide a measured amount of ink

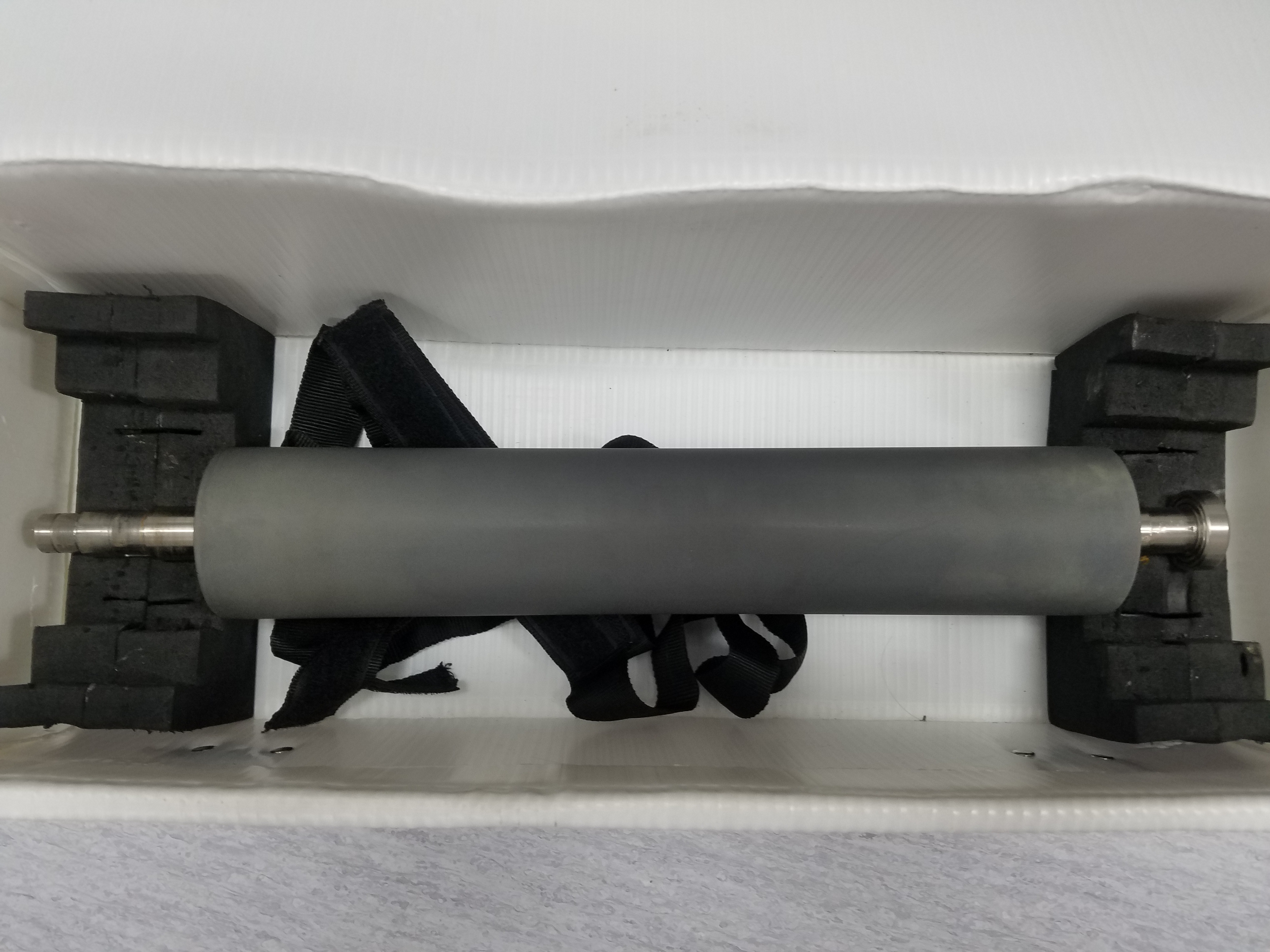
An anilox roll

In printing, anilox is a method used to provide a measured amount of ink to a flexographic (flexo) printing plate. An anilox roll is a hard cylinder, usually constructed of a steel or aluminum core which is coated by an industrial ceramic, typically chromium(III) oxide powder, whose surface is engraved with millions of very fine dimples, known as anilox cells. In the printing process, the anilox roll is coated in a precise layer of ink that is then transferred to the raised portions of the printing plate. The number, size, and geometry of the anilox cells vary and will determine the amount of ink that the anilox roll delivers to the plate.

== Usage ==
Depending on the detail of the images to be printed, the press operator will select an anilox roll with a higher or lower line screen. "Line screen" is the term used for the number of cells engraved on the anilox. Low line screen rolls (100-300 lpi) are used where a heavy layer of ink is desired, such as in heavy block lettering. Higher line screens (500-1500 lpi) produce finer details and are used in four-color process work such as reproducing photographs. Often a job will require a different line screen for each color to be printed. Experienced press operators are skilled at determining the appropriate rolls for a given print job.

Depending on the design of the printing press, the anilox roll is either semi-submerged in the ink fountain, or comes into contact with a so-called metering roller, which is semi-submerged in the ink fountain. In either instance, a thick layer of typically viscous ink is deposited on the roller. A doctor blade is used to shave excess ink from the surface leaving just the measured amount of ink in the cells. The roll then rotates to make contact with the flexographic printing plate which receives the ink from the cells for transfer to the printed material.

Anilox roll selection should be based on cell volume or capacity of the engraved cells. Print results are accomplished with this volume, which transfers to the printing plate and then to the substrate. In general transfer, efficiency is approximately 25% to the substrate. Cell count remains the same for the life of the roll, while volume changes over time due to wear, plugging and damage. Cell count accommodates volume at various cell shapes available from the laser engraving process. The same cell count can be engraved to or wear to different volumes.

=== Chambered Doctor Blade ===
Contemporary ink metering systems employ a self contained system known as a chambered doctor blade system which is basically a manifold which delivers ink to the anilox roll. Ink is pumped through a hose to the chamber which fills to capacity. Ink is retained within the system by end seals and doctor blades. One blade works as a retaining blade, simply holding ink within the chamber. The other reverse angle blade works as previously described, removing excess ink from the engraved surface of the anilox roll.

Chambered doctor blade systems are recognized for high quality, consistency and accuracy removing the influence of press speed and some human subjectivity.

== Roll manufacture and specification ==
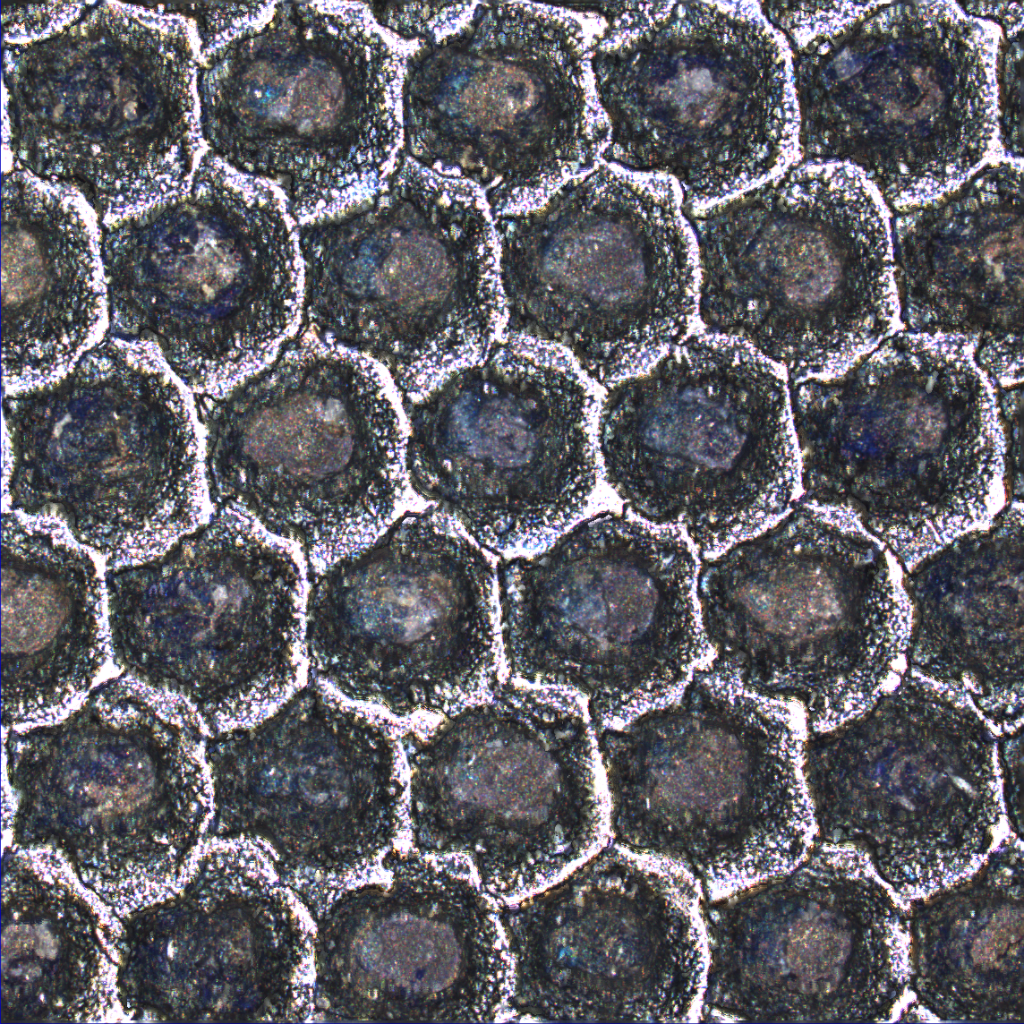
Optical micrograph of anilox cells. Each cell is about 100 μm across.

Anilox rolls were originally made using a process of mechanical engraving, utilizing hardened steel tools of various cell counts and cell shapes diamond pecking machine, but modern rolls are laser engraved. The characteristics of an anilox roll determine the amount of ink that will be transferred to the plate: angle of the cells, cell volume, and line screen. A 60 degree angle ensures maximum density in a given space. Lower volume makes for less ink. Low line numbers will allow for a heavy layer of ink to be printed, whereas high line numbers will permit finer detail in printing. Both cell volume and line screen are closely correlated.

The rolls are often specified by their line screen, which is the number of cells per linear inch. These often range from around 250 to upwards of 2000, though the precise numbers vary by manufacturer. Most rolls sold are within 800 LPI, although a spike in demand for those with 800–1200 lines has been seen. Anilox rolls are almost always designed to be removed from the press for cleaning and for swapping out with different line screen rolls.

Anilox rolls are properly specified by cell volume for the required print application. Lower volumes = thinner ink films for the highest quality process printing. Higher volumes address combination, screens, line work, solid coverage and coating applications. In virtually all printing applications with various print requirements, one volume will not print all to the highest quality. Limited print stations generally call for a compromise between the highest quality graphics and color.

There are many variables to consider when specifying an anilox roll beyond the print requirements, such as substrate, ink system, plate material, plate mounting tape, press speed, and drying capacity. The best course of action is to consult suppliers of all these components for proper engraving specifications from their experience.

=== Anilox roll specifications ===
There are two ways to specify anilox roll settings: on transfer volume or on line count. Each specification has both a European standard and an American standard.

==== Transfer volume ====
Transfer volume is the volume of ink that will be transferred per unit surface area of paper. The European standard for transfer volume is cm^{3}/m^{2} or cubic centimetre per square meter, which means 1 cm^{3} of ink will be transferred onto 1 m^{2} of paper.

Sometimes ink suppliers will give a recommended transfer weight per square meter, expressed in g/m^{2}. This can be converted to cm^{3}/m^{2} by dividing by the density of the ink in g/cm^{3}.

The American standard for transfer volume is a billion cubic microns per square inch, typically written as BCM / in^{2}, BCM/sq in, or BCM. A cubic micron (μm^{3}) is a unit of volume and one billion cubic microns (1 000 000 000 μm^{3}) is equal to 0.001 cm^{3}. Since one square meter is equal to 1550 square inches, it follows that 1 BCM/in^{2} = 1.55 cm^{3}/m^{2}.

==== Line count ====
Line count measures the fineness of the pattern on the anilox roll. It measures how many cells are engraved per centimetre or inch.

In Europe the standard is LPCM or lines per centimeter.

In America, the standard is LPI or lines per inch.

The conversion from transfer volume to line count is not straightforward. This is because depending on the pattern used for the cell and depth of gravure of the anilox roll, the cell might contain higher or lower volumes of ink. The only way to convert cm^{3}/m^{2} (transfer volume) to LPCM (cell finesse) or BCM to LPI is to look at the conversion chart provided by the anilox roll supplier.

Also, any given anilox roll will age after some time and its actual transfer volume will be less and less.

== Handling and maintenance ==
Though large wide-web flexo rolls are only maneuverable by overhead crane, on smaller presses anilox rolls are often handled directly by operators. Extreme caution must be taken when handling these pieces of hardware as a single bump against a hard surface or sharp corner can destroy the delicate cell structure on the surface and render a roller completely useless, at a cost of around US$5000 for even small narrow-web rollers. Nicks and scratches add up quickly, so fine brushes (never brass brushes) are used for cleaning the anilox roll.

Anilox rollers that are used with water, solvent and oil based inks, which dry when left sitting out and unagitated, must be cleaned immediately after use or a problem known as plugging occurs, where minuscule amounts of ink dry in the cells. This leaves tiny, but unacceptable, pinholes in anything printed from the roll in the future. Anilox rolls can also become damaged if a steel doctor blade breaks and begins to grind the anilox roll. This creates a defect in the print called a "score line" due to the scoring of the anilox.

== Environmental Considerations ==
Ceramic Anilox are routinely manufactured by plasma spraying chromium(III) oxide powders (Cr_{2}O_{3}) on to the roller or sleeve surface.

Chromium oxide is manufactured by calcining sodium dichromate in the presence of carbon or sulfur.

The European Chemical Agency (ECHA) classes sodium dichromate a Substance of Very High Concern (SVHC)
