= Doctor blade =

Element of printing machines

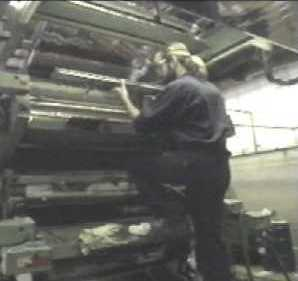
A technician installs a doctor blade for flexographic printing.

In printing, the doctor blade (from ductor blade) removes the excess ink from the smooth non-engraved portions of the anilox roll and the land areas of the cell walls. Doctor blades are also used in other printing and coating processes, such as flexo and pad printing for the same function. It is believed that the name derives from the blades used in flatbed letterpress equipment for blades used to wipe ductor rolls, and "ductor" became doctor.

== Design ==
In a single blade ink system or dual blade ink system, the blade removes the excess ink from the cylinder or anilox roll to create a uniform layer of ink to be transferred to the printing plate. The blade/anilox combination is designed such that it is (chiefly) the blade which wears away, not the anilox roll. The doctor blade is a relatively cheap and disposable consumable, while the gravure cylinder or flexo anilox is a more expensive component of the press. Typical materials for the blade are steel or polymer: gravure cylinders are normally hard-chrome plated and flexo aniloxes may be chromed or ceramic.

Important process variables in gravure coating and printing are the rotational position at which the blade wipes the cylinder, the angle that the blade makes with the tangent to the cylinder at the contact point, and the pressure applied to the blade. Fine adjustment of in-and-out position, independently on left and right, must also be possible, in order to compensate for any misalignment between blade geometry and cylinder axis. These requirements are fulfilled by a doctor blade assembly which includes a doctor blade holder.

Doctor blades are traditionally designed in 3 main tip configurations: straight, bevel and lamella. A straight doctor blade has a straight, blunt edge and is used for lower quality print. A beveled doctor blade is cut at an angle creating a beveled edge. A lamella tip is a doctor blade with a unique geometry that is thin at the tip, gradually becoming larger in a step pattern or other design. The bevel and lamella designs allow for a smaller blade-to-anilox contact roll which increases its ability to precisely shear the anilox roll or gravure cylinder.

== Oscillation ==
In order to keep the wear pattern as even as possible, and to help prevent any particles in the angle between blade and cylinder, all except the smallest machines use oscillating doctor blades. The entire doctor blade assembly oscillates from side to side. The oscillation, flexibility of the blade, and the various possible misalignments and problems due to a lack of stiffness may result in the failure to achieve the desired angle of contact between the blade and the cylinder, or at least a failure to consistently achieve this desired angle.

== Replacement ==
Of necessity, the doctor blade must be easy and quick to replace. On many machines, the doctor blade holder is easily removable from the machine and the replacement of a doctor blade is done by removing the blade holder from the machine; discarding the old blade; inserting the new blade; and then replacing the blade holder and new blade in the machine. Most professionals prefer to use a removal tool such as a doctor blade puller for safety.

== See also ==
- Squeegee
