= Glass printing =

Application of patterns, images, etc. to glass

Glass printing involves applying images, patterns, or text to glass surfaces. Various techniques can be used, each offering distinct aesthetic and functional results. This specialized field encompasses methods such as screen printing, digital printing, and pad printing, among others.
