= Flexographic ink =

Printing ink used in the process of flexography

Flexographic inks are inks transferred by the process of flexography, primarily used in the printing of packing materials (cardboard boxes, corrugated cardboard, paper bags and plastic bags, food packaging, labels, newspapers, catalogues, etc.). The inks and method of printing continues to grow in popularity due to its low cost and environmentally friendly nature. The most important part of the printing process is the application of the ink.

== Types ==
The main types of flexographic ink are water based, solvent and UV curable. The printing surface (substrate type) dictates what ink type it is advisable to use. Each type of ink has its advantages and disadvantages, therefore the type of ink used in printing is determined by factors such as price, speed, and the use of the packaging (food, cleaning, or shopping bags).

== History ==
In the early stages of flexography, aniline dye ink was used. Because of its toxicity, its use in food packaging was banned and it brought on complications due to frequent staining and the need for bleeding. Over time, changes and improvements were made, involving the substitution of aniline dye for polyamide resins which speed up the drying process and as such the overall printing process itself.

Solvent-based inks began to be used, which were safe for food packaging, but harmful to the environment. The Environmental Law of the 1980s led to printers trying out water-based inks. Today, most printers are easily adapted to water-based inks, allowing printers to recycle ink for later use.

== Usage ==
George Sickinger, CEO of International Colour Resolutions, says that "over time, water-based inks have a much higher herbal resin content and will become the new standard for the formulation of water bases. "Sickinger also stated that the UV-curable inks require less energy and produce less waste, while the quality is higher.

The Environmental Protection Agency has worked with the flexographic industry in the design of a project to help flexographic businesses, promoting water-based inks for their low power consumption, and UV curable ink systems, because they use less ink.

Currently in the EU, there are 2 institutions that provide companies with the "OK COMPOST" and "COMPOSTABLE" certification, VINÇOTTE and DIN CERTCO, to be used by inks in the print of bioplastics that fulfill the requirements of biodegrading and compost ability. One of the first ink producers, in the beginning of the year 2000, to obtain this certification and commercialize these types of inks was Chimigraf.
