= Printing =

Process for reproducing text and images

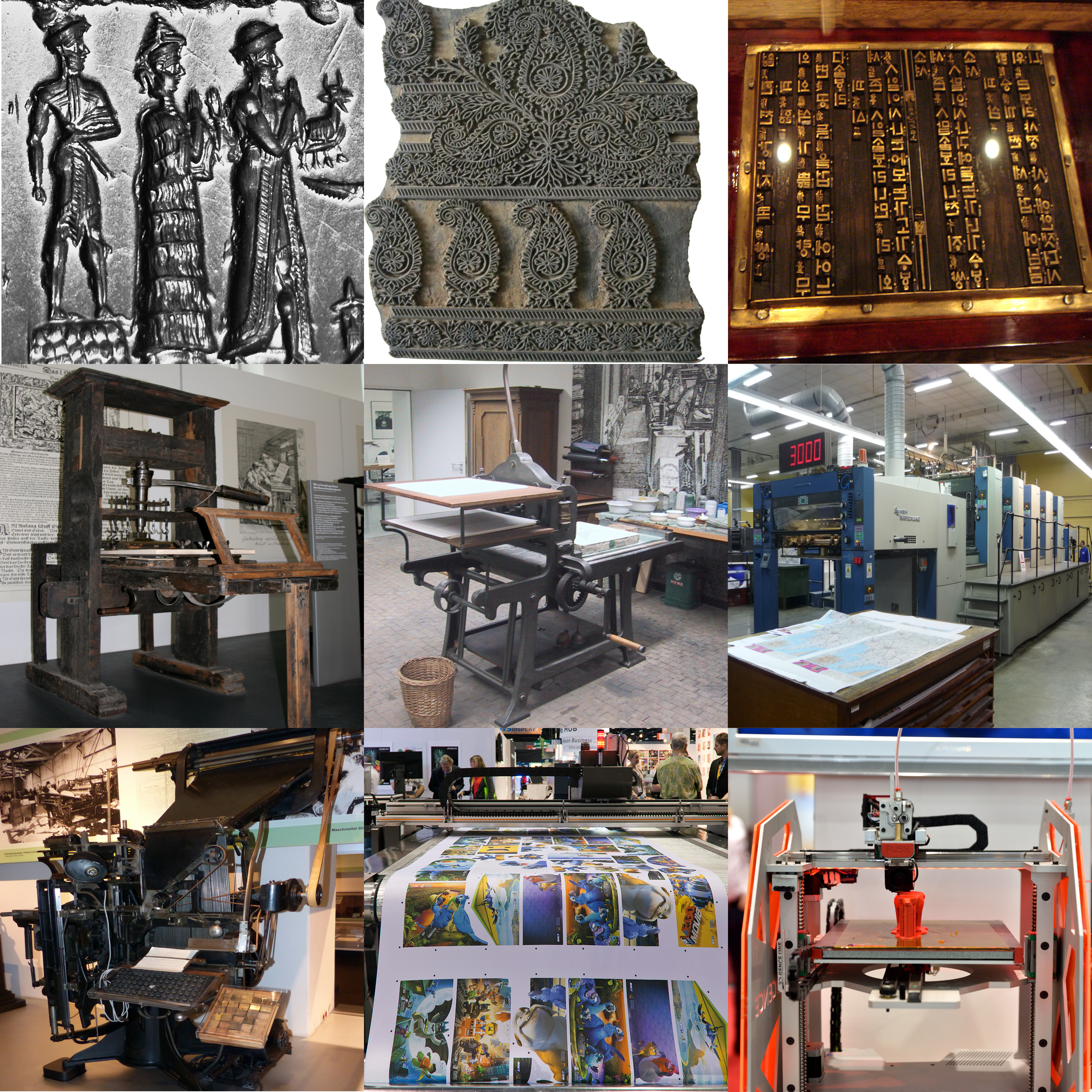
From top to bottom, left to right: cylinder seal of a scene, block used for woodblock printing, movable type, printing press, lithograph press, offset press used for modern lithographic printing, linotype machine for hot metal typesetting, digital printer, 3D printer in action.

Printing is a process for mass reproducing text and images using a master form or template. The earliest non-paper products involving printing include cylinder seals and objects such as the Cyrus Cylinder and the Cylinders of Nabonidus. The earliest known form of printing evolved from ink rubbings made on paper or cloth from texts on stone tablets, used during the sixth century. (Note: An early method of reproduction that has been traced to the second century is the practice of using needles pushed through a stencil onto the target paper, fabric or plaster, to provide guidelines for subsequent artwork: this cannot reasonably be described as printing.) Printing by pressing an inked image onto paper (using woodblock printing) appeared later that century. Later developments in printing technology include the movable type invented by Bi Sheng around 1040 and the printing press invented by Johannes Gutenberg in the 15th century. The technology of printing played a key role in the development of the Renaissance and the Scientific Revolution and laid the material basis for the modern knowledge-based economy and the spread of learning to the masses.

== History ==
=== Woodblock printing ===
Woodblock printing is a technique for printing text, images or patterns that was used widely throughout East Asia. It originated in China in antiquity as a method of printing on textiles and later on paper.

==== In East Asia ====
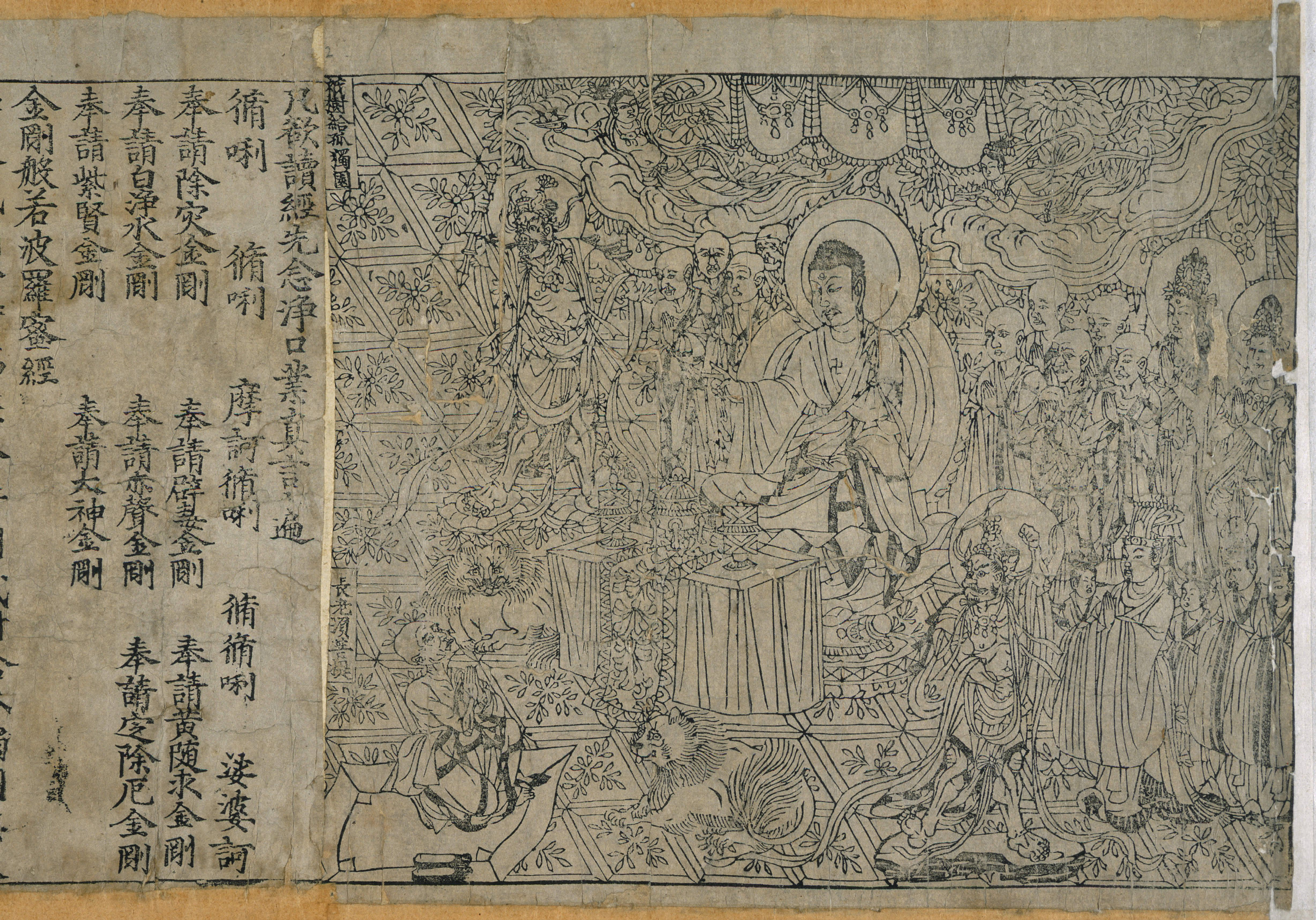
The intricate frontispiece of the Diamond Sutra from Tang dynasty China, AD 868 (British Library), discovered at the Library Cave of Mogao Caves in Dunhuang, but probably printed in Sichuan.

The earliest examples of ink-squeeze rubbings and potential stone printing blocks appear in the mid-sixth century in China. A type of printing called mechanical woodblock printing on paper started during the 7th century in the Tang dynasty, and subsequently spread throughout East Asia. Nara Japan printed the Hyakumantō Darani en masse around 770, and distributed them to temples throughout Japan. In Korea, an example of woodblock printing from the eighth century was discovered in 1966. A copy of the Buddhist Dharani Sutra called the Pure Light Dharani Sutra (Korean: 무구정광대다라니경; Hanja: 無垢淨光大陀羅尼經; RR: Mugu jeonggwang dae darani-gyeong), discovered in Gyeongju, in a Silla dynasty pagoda that was repaired in 751, was undated but must have been created sometime before the reconstruction of the Shakyamuni Pagoda of Bulguk Temple, Kyongju Province in 751. The document is estimated to have been created no later than 704.

By the ninth century, printing on paper had taken off, and the first completely surviving printed book is the Diamond Sutra (British Library) of 868, uncovered from Dunhuang. By the tenth century, 400,000 copies of some sutras and pictures were printed, and the Confucian classics were in print. A skilled printer could print up to 2,000 double-page sheets per day.

Printing spread early to Korea and Japan, which also used Chinese logograms, but the technique was also used in Turpan and Vietnam using a number of other scripts. This technique then spread to Persia and Russia. This technique was transmitted to Europe by around 1400 and was used on paper for old master prints and playing cards.351-367

==== In the Islamic World ====
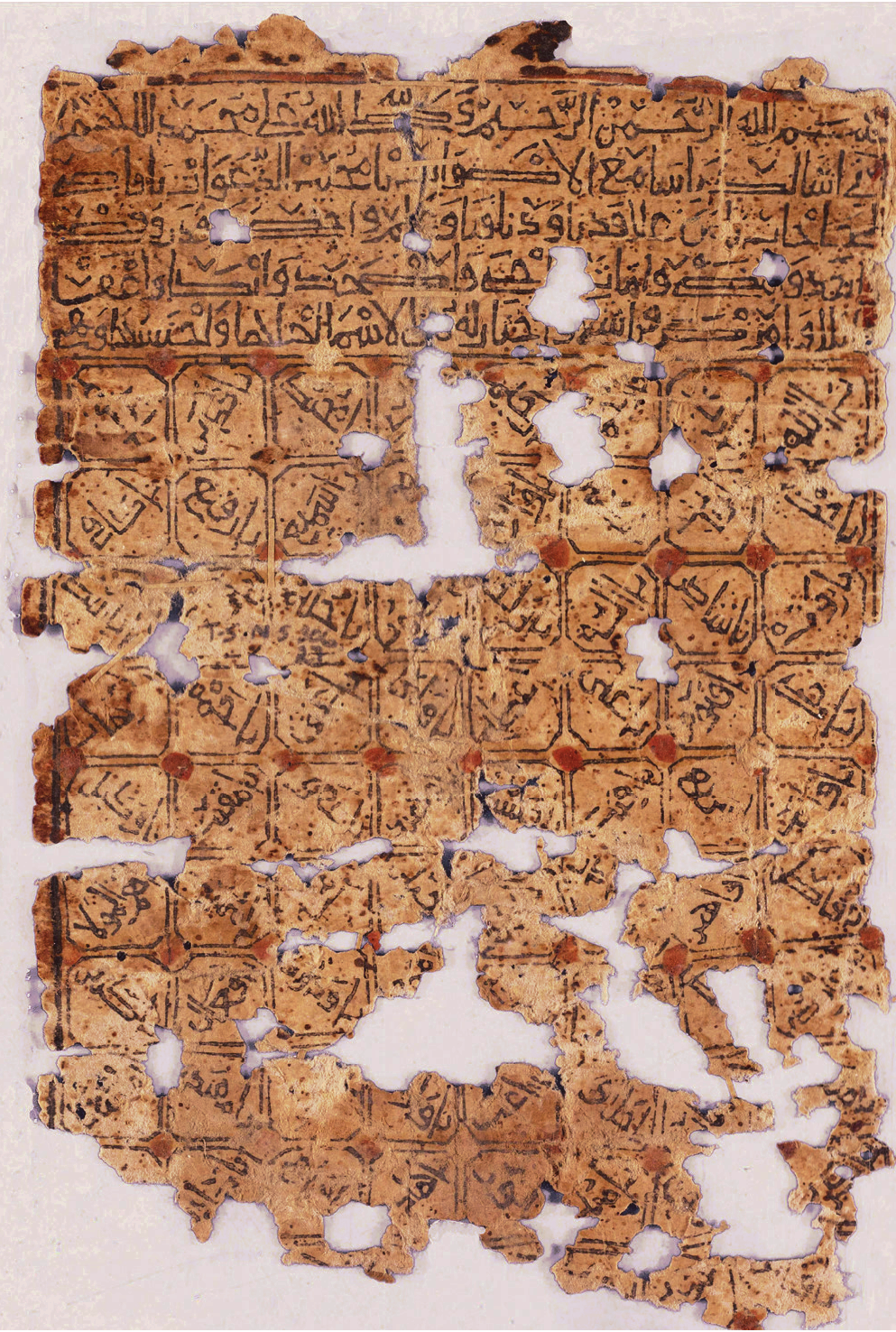
A printed amulet containing an 80 cell grid of the "Beautiful Names" of Allah. With a letter height of 0.2-1 cm. Cairo Geniza

From 900-1444 wooden and tin block printing (known as a ṭarsh) was in use throughout the Islamic world, its use in 10th century Muslim Spain marked the earliest instance of block printing in Europe. It was mostly a minority enterprise by street magicians and tricksters known as the Banū Sāsān or Ghurabā', who mass printed amulets and talismans featuring Qur'anic verses and magical symbols, keeping the mechanical process secret to feign handwritten authenticity for illiterate buyers. Of these over 70 survive, though no print block. The craft reached a high level of technical complexity, some talismans being composed of minuscule text only 0.1 cm high.

However, it was also used for official uses, such as to stamp Fatimid tax receipts and the Emirate of Granada's commercial goods as well as to print Almohad state decrees, Ilkhanid paper money and elaborate Hajj certificates. After 1436 or 1444 block printing vanishes from the Islamic world without explanation. However, Egyptian Romani Ghurabā' migrating to Central Europe at the start of the 15th century may have played a role in the transmission of block printing to Europe.

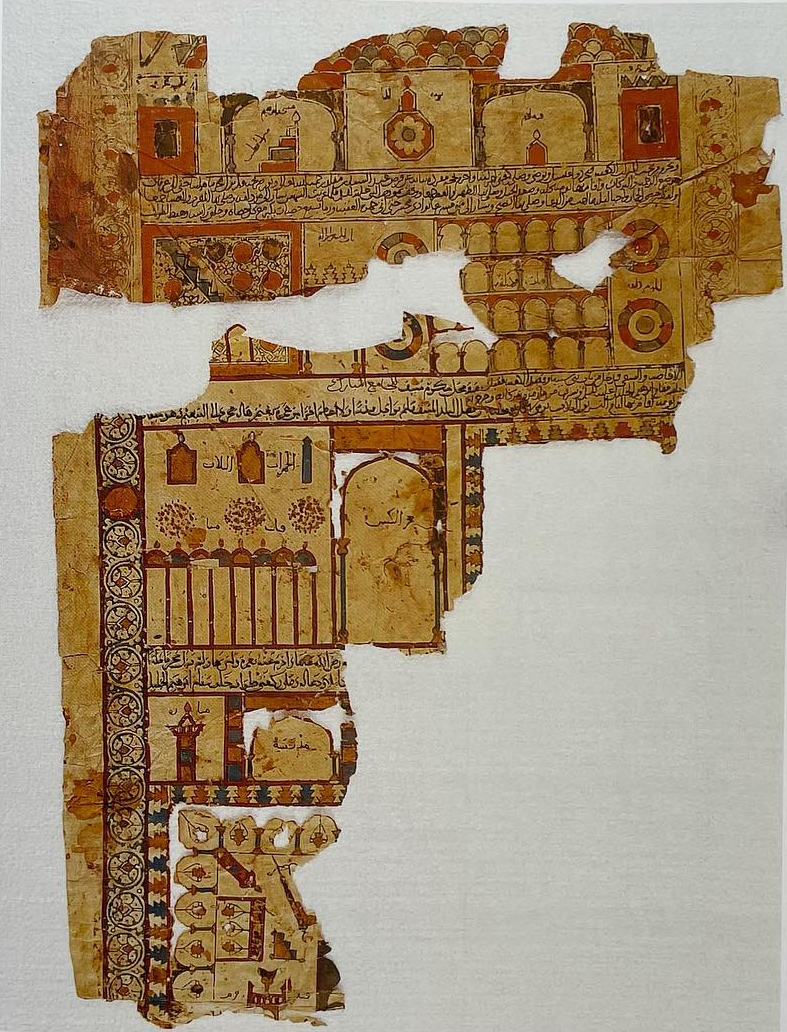
Fragments of 3 identical monumental printed hajj certificates (210cm x 50cm) from 1239-1242, Damascus

==== In Europe ====
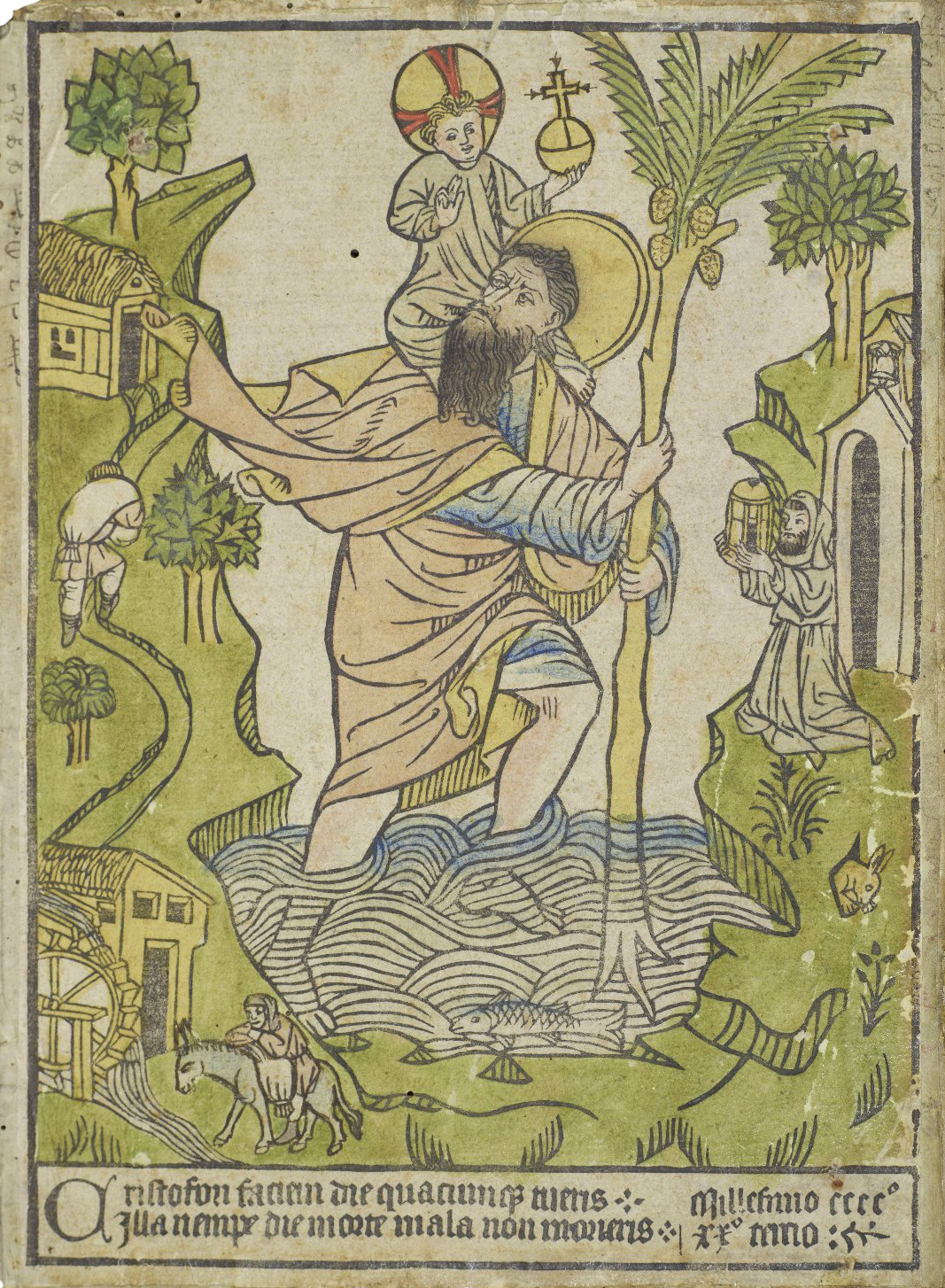
The earliest known woodcut, 1423, from Buxheim in Bavaria, with hand-colouring

Block printing first came to Europe as a method for printing on cloth, where it was common by 1300. Images printed on cloth for religious purposes could be quite large and elaborate. When paper became relatively easily available, around 1400, the technique transferred very quickly to small woodcut religious images and playing cards printed on paper. These prints were produced in very large numbers from about 1425 onward.

Around the mid-fifteenth-century, block-books, woodcut books with both text and images, usually carved in the same block, emerged as a cheaper alternative to manuscripts and books printed with movable type. These were all short, heavily illustrated works, the bestsellers of the day, repeated in many different block-book versions: the Ars moriendi and the Biblia pauperum were the most common. There is still some controversy among scholars as to whether their introduction preceded or, in the majority view, followed the introduction of movable type, with the estimated range of dates being between about 1440 and 1460.

=== Movable-type printing ===
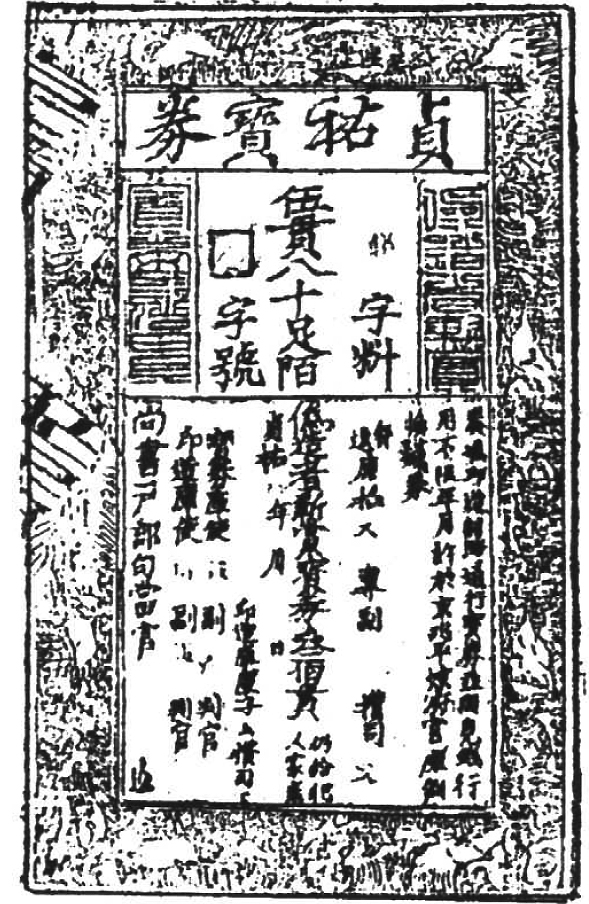
Copperplate of 1215–1216 5000 cash paper money with ten bronze movable types

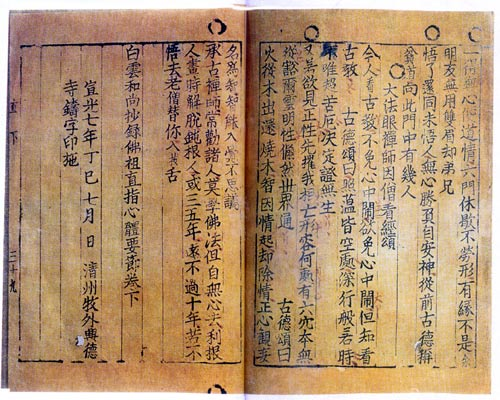
Jikji, "Selected Teachings of Buddhist Sages and Son Masters" from Korea, the earliest known book printed with movable metal type, 1377. Bibliothèque Nationale de France, Paris

Movable type is the system of printing and typography using movable pieces of metal type, made by casting from matrices struck by letterpunches. Movable type allowed for much more flexible processes than hand copying or block printing.

Around 1040, the first known movable type system was created in China by Bi Sheng out of porcelain. Bi Sheng used clay type, which broke easily, but Wang Zhen by 1298 had carved a more durable type from wood. He also developed a complex system of revolving tables and number-association with written Chinese characters that made typesetting and printing more efficient. Still, the main method in use there remained woodblock printing (xylography), which "proved to be cheaper and more efficient for printing Chinese, with its thousands of characters".

Copper movable type printing originated in China at the beginning of the 12th century. It was used in large-scale printing of paper money issued by the Northern Song dynasty. Movable type spread to Korea during the Goryeo dynasty.

Around 1230, Koreans invented a metal type movable printing using bronze. The Jikji, published in 1377, is the earliest known metal printed book. Type-casting was used, adapted from the method of casting coins. The character was cut in beech wood, which was then pressed into a soft clay to form a mould, and bronze poured into the mould, and finally the type was polished. Eastern metal movable type was spread to Europe between the late 14th and early 15th centuries. The Korean form of metal movable type was described by the French scholar Henri-Jean Martin as "extremely similar to Gutenberg's". Authoritative historians Frances Gies and Joseph Gies claimed that "The Asian priority of invention movable type is now firmly established, and that Chinese-Korean technique, or a report of it traveled westward is almost certain."

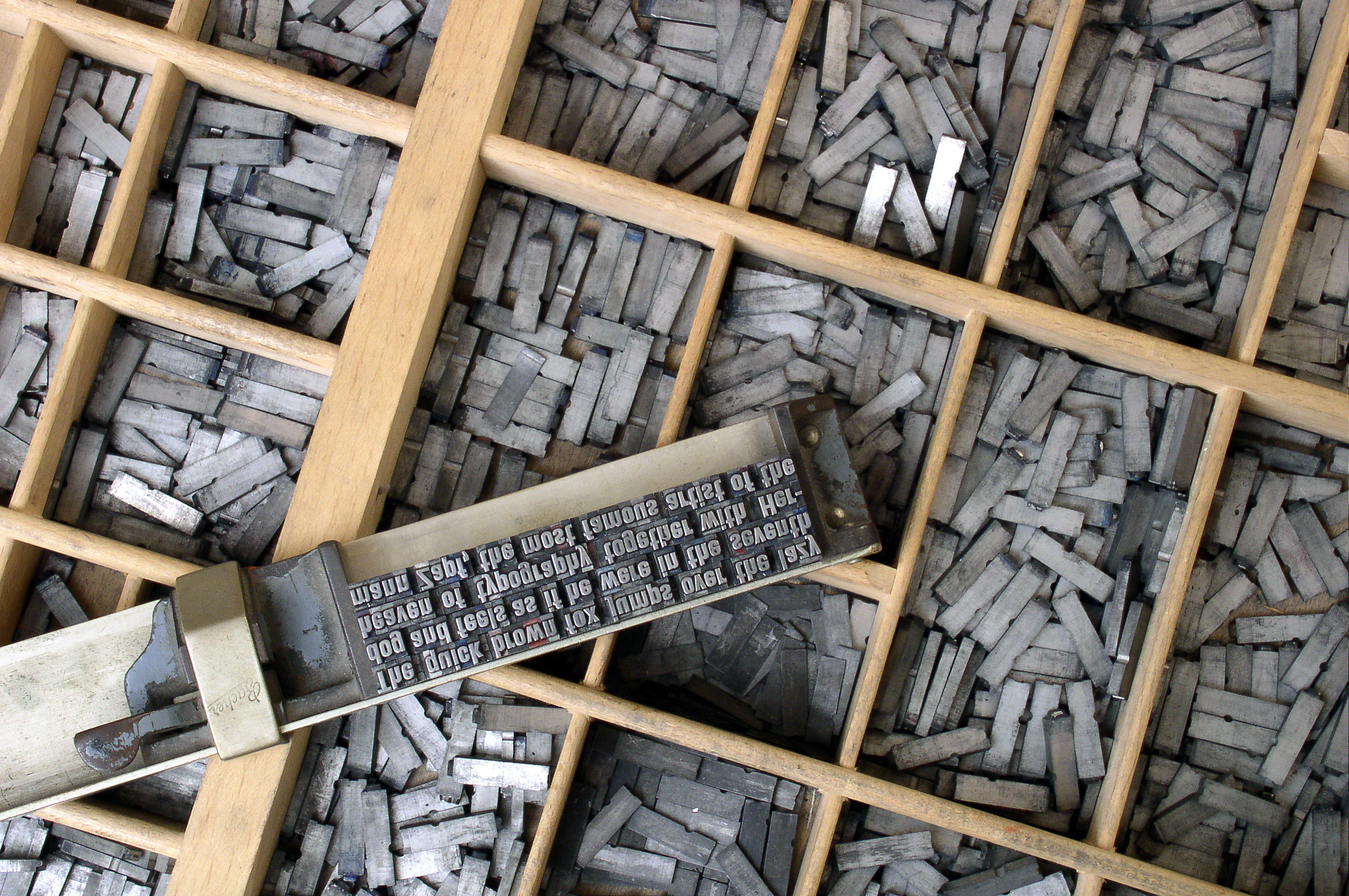
A case of cast metal type pieces and typeset matter in a composing stick

=== The printing press ===
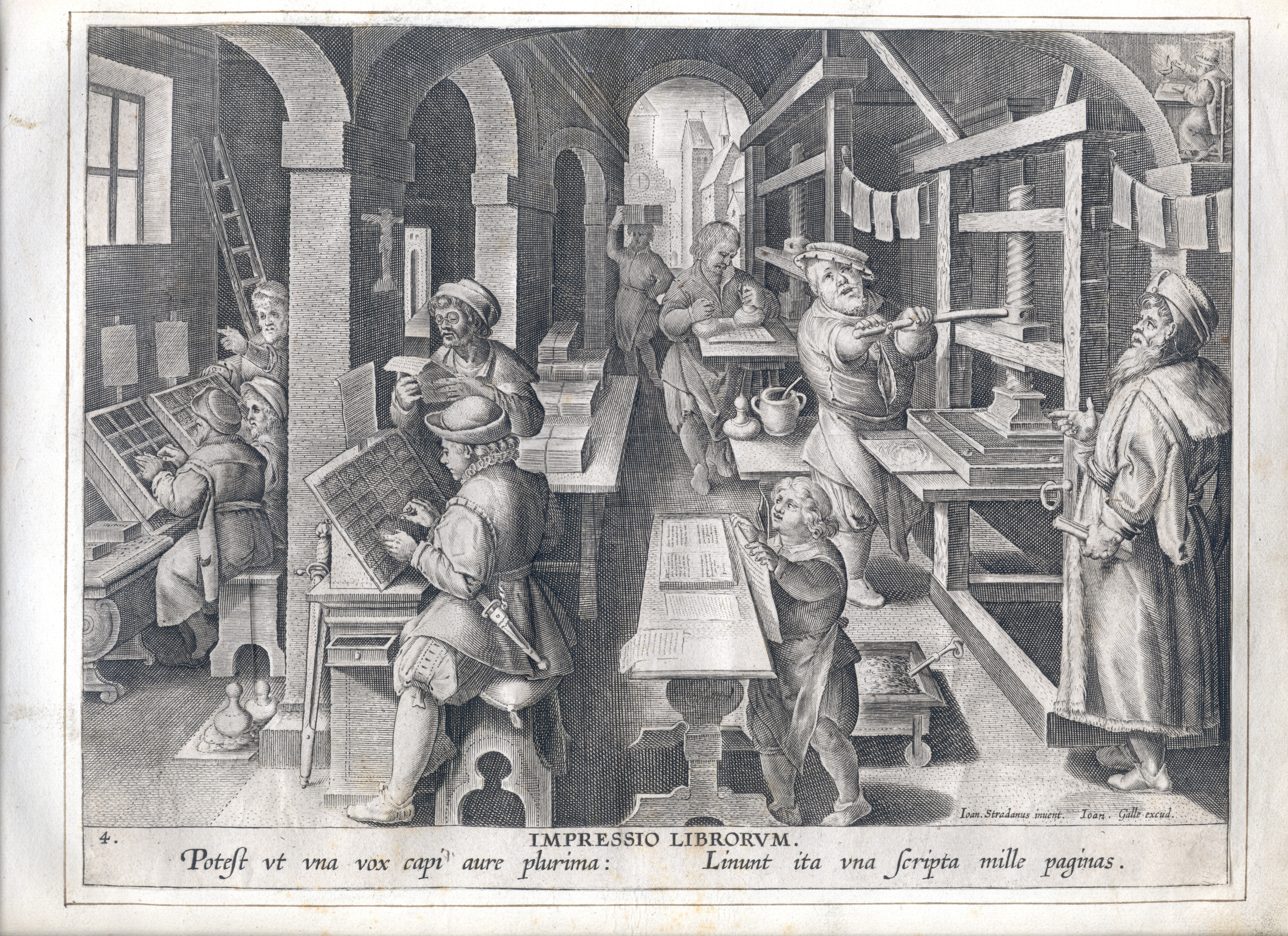
The invention of printing, anonymous, design by Stradanus, collection Plantin–Moretus Museum in Antwerp, Belgium

Around 1450, Johannes Gutenberg introduced the first movable-type printing system in Europe. He advanced innovations in casting type based on a matrix and hand mould, adaptations to the screw-press, the use of an oil-based ink, and the creation of a softer and more absorbent paper. Gutenberg was the first to cast his type pieces from an alloy of lead, tin, antimony, copper and bismuth – the same components still used today. Johannes Gutenberg started work on his printing press around 1436, in partnership with Andreas Dritzehen – whom he had previously instructed in gem-cutting – and with Andreas Heilmann, the owner of a paper mill.

Compared to woodblock printing, movable-type page-setting and printing using a press proved faster and more durable. Also, the metal type-pieces were sturdier and the lettering more uniform, leading to developments in typography and font design. The high quality and relatively low price of the Gutenberg Bible (1455) established the superiority of movable type for Western languages. The printing press rapidly spread across Europe, leading up to the Renaissance, and later all around the world.

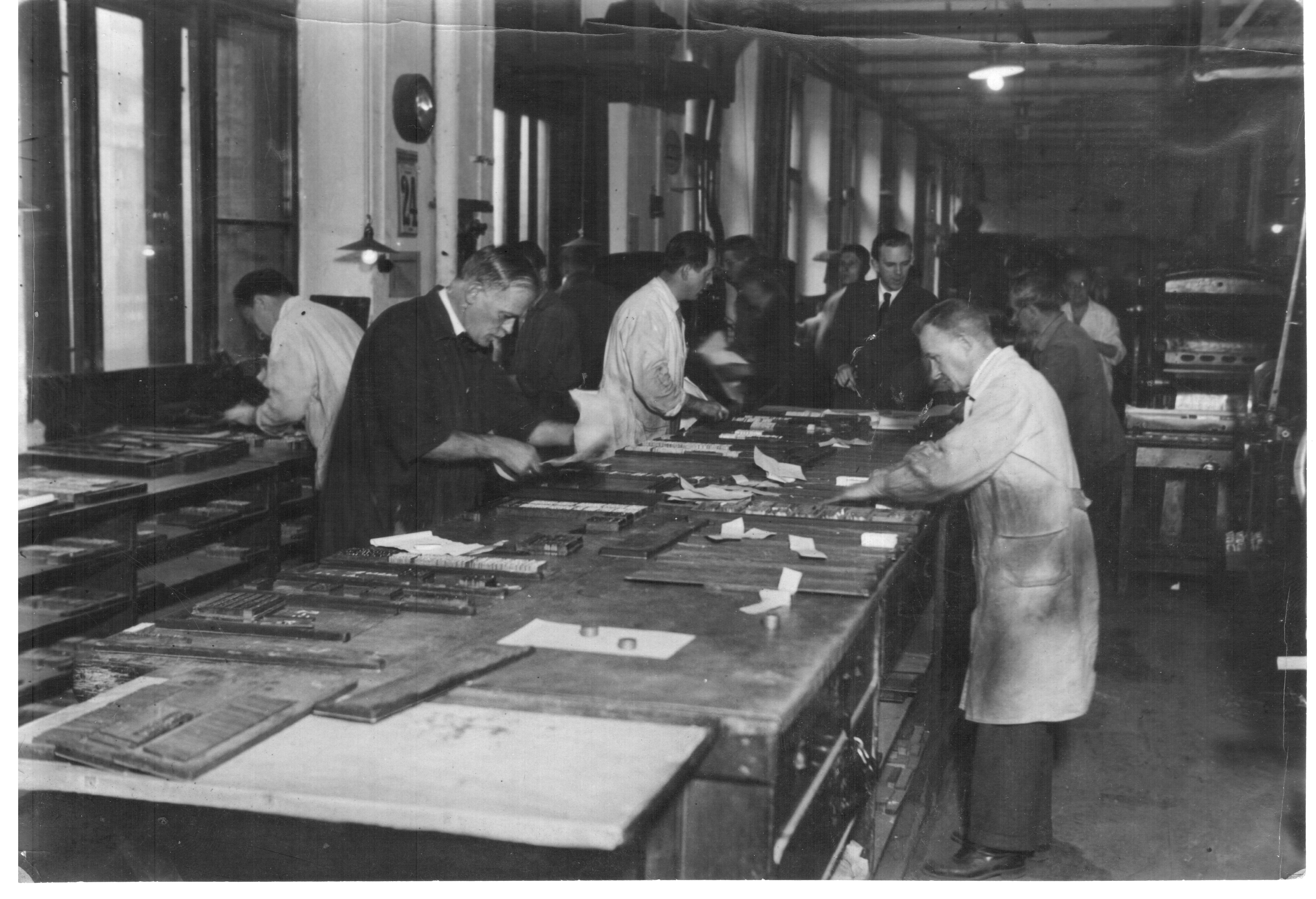
A page-setting room, c. 1920

In 1651 Thomas Hobbes assigned "ingenious" printing a significant yet lowly place in a hierarchy of linguistic invention. But Time Life magazine in 1997 ranked Gutenberg's innovations in movable type printing as the most important invention of the second millennium.

=== Rotary printing press ===
The steam-powered rotary printing press, invented in 1843 in the United States by Richard M. Hoe, ultimately allowed millions of copies of a page in a single day. Mass production of printed works flourished after the transition to rolled paper, as continuous feed allowed the presses to run at a much faster pace. Hoe's original design operated at up to 2,000 revolutions per hour where each revolution deposited 4 page images, giving the press a throughput of 8,000 pages per hour. By 1891, The New York World and Philadelphia Item were operating presses producing either 90,000 4-page sheets per hour or 48,000 8-page sheets.

The rotary printing press uses impressions curved around a cylinder to print on long continuous rolls of paper or other substrates. Rotary drum printing was later significantly improved by William Bullock. There are multiple types of rotary printing press technologies that are still used today: sheetfed offset, rotogravure, and flexographic printing.

=== Printing capacity ===
The table lists the maximum number of pages which various press designs could print per hour.

	Hand-operated presses		Steam-powered presses			
	Gutenberg-style c. 1600	Stanhope press c. 1800	Koenig press 1812	Koenig press 1813	Koenig press 1814	Koenig press 1818
Impressions per hour	200	480	800	1,100	2,000	2,400

== Conventional printing technology ==
All printing process are concerned with two kinds of areas on the final output:

1. Image area (printing areas)
2. Non-image area (non-printing areas)

After the information has been prepared for production (the prepress step), each printing process has definitive means of separating the image from the non-image areas.

Conventional printing has four types of process:

1. Planographics, in which the printing and non-printing areas are on the same plane surface and the difference between them is maintained chemically or by physical properties, the examples are: offset lithography, collotype, and screenless printing.
2. Relief, in which the printing areas are on a plane surface and the non printing areas are below the surface, examples: flexography and letterpress.
3. Intaglio, in which the non-printing areas are on a plane surface and the printing area are etched or engraved below the surface, examples: steel die engraving, gravure, etching, collagraph.
4. Porous or Stencil, in which the printing areas are on fine mesh screens through which ink can penetrate, and the non-printing areas are a stencil over the screen to block the flow of ink in those areas, examples: screen printing, stencil duplicator, risograph.

=== Crop marks ===
To print an image without a blank area around the image, the non-printing areas must be trimmed after printing. Crop marks can be used to show the printer where the printing area ends, and the non-printing area begins. The part of the image which is trimmed off is called bleed.

=== Letterpress ===
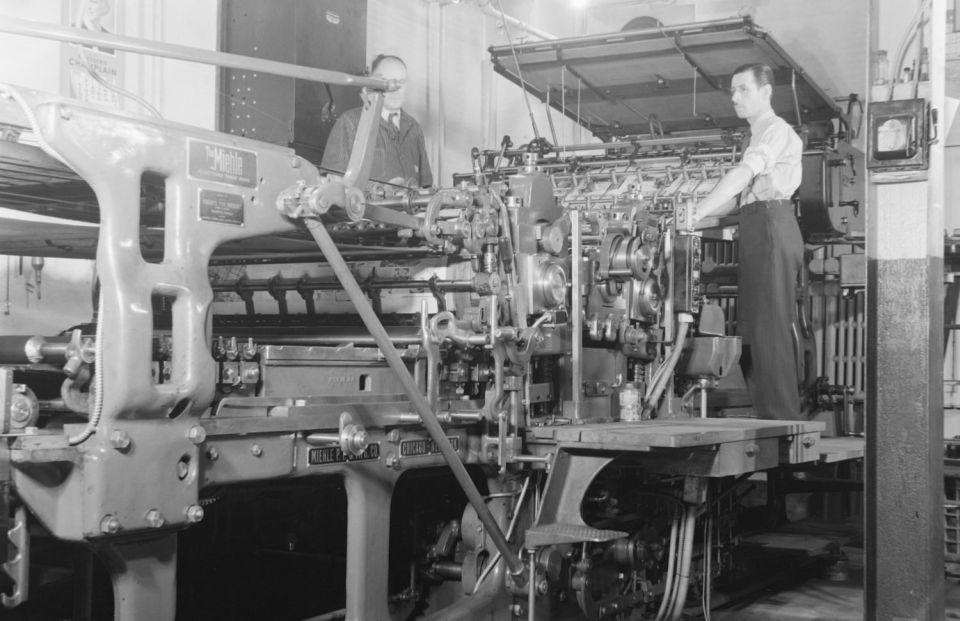
Miehle press printing Le Samedi journal. Montreal, 1939.

Letterpress printing is a technique of relief printing. A worker composes and locks movable type into the bed of a press, inks it, and presses paper against it to transfer the ink from the type which creates an impression on the paper. There is different paper for different works the quality of paper shows different ink to use.

Letterpress printing was the normal form of printing text from its invention by Johannes Gutenberg in the mid-15th century and remained in wide use for books and other uses until the second half of the 20th century, when offset printing was developed. More recently, letterpress printing has seen a revival in an artisanal form.

=== Offset ===
The 910-ton printing presses at the Las Vegas Review-Journal were the largest in the world when installed in 2000

Offset printing is a widely used modern printing process. This technology is best described as when a positive (right-reading) image on a printing plate is inked and transferred (or "offset") from the plate to a rubber blanket. The blanket image becomes a mirror image of the plate image. An offset transfer moves the image to a printing substrate (typically paper), making the image right-reading again. Offset printing uses a lithographic process which is based on the repulsion of oil and water. The offset process employs a flat (planographic) image carrier (plate) which is mounted on a press cylinder. The image to be printed obtains ink from ink rollers, while the non-printing area attracts an (acidic) film of water, keeping the non-image areas ink-free. Most offset presses use three cylinders: Plate, blanket, impression. Currently, most books and newspapers are printed using offset lithography.

=== Gravure ===
Gravure printing is an intaglio printing technique, where the image being printed is made up of small depressions in the surface of the printing plate. The cells are filled with ink, and the excess is scraped off the surface with a doctor blade. Then a rubber-covered roller presses paper onto the surface of the plate and into contact with the ink in the cells. The printing cylinders are usually made from copper plated steel, which is subsequently chromed, and may be produced by diamond engraving; etching, or laser ablation.

Gravure printing is known for its ability to produce high-quality, high-resolution images with accurate color reproduction and using viscosity control equipment during production. Ink evaporation control affects the change in the color of the printed image.

Gravure printing is used for long, high-quality print runs such as magazines, mail-order catalogues, packaging and printing onto fabric and wallpaper. It is also used for printing postage stamps and decorative plastic laminates, such as kitchen worktops.

=== Flexography ===
Flexography is a type of relief printing. The relief plates are typically made from photopolymers. The process is used for flexible packaging, corrugated board, labels, newspapers and more. In this market it competes with gravure printing by holding 80% of the market in US, 50% in Europe but only 20% in Asia.

=== Other printing techniques ===
The other significant printing techniques include:

- Dye-sublimation printer
- Inkjet, used typically to print a small number of books or packaging, and also to print a variety of materials: from high quality papers simulating offset printing, to floor tiles. Inkjet is also used to apply mailing addresses to direct mail pieces
- Laser printing (toner printing) mainly used in offices and for transactional printing (bills, bank documents). Laser printing is commonly used by direct mail companies to create variable data letters or coupons.
- Pad printing, popular for its ability to print on complex three-dimensional surfaces
- Relief print, mainly used for catalogues
- Screen printing for a variety of applications ranging from T-shirts to floor tiles, and on uneven surfaces
- Intaglio, used mainly for high value documents such as currencies.
- Thermal printing, popular in the 1990s for fax printing. Used today for printing labels such as airline baggage tags and individual price labels in supermarket deli counters.

== Impact of German movable type printing press ==
=== Quantitative aspects ===
European output of books printed by movable type from c. 1450 to 1800

It is estimated that following the innovation of Gutenberg's printing press, the European book output rose from a few million to around one billion copies within a span of less than four centuries.

=== Religious impact ===
Samuel Hartlib, who was exiled in Britain and enthusiastic about social and cultural reforms, wrote in 1641 that "the art of printing will so spread knowledge that the common people, knowing their own rights and liberties, will not be governed by way of oppression".

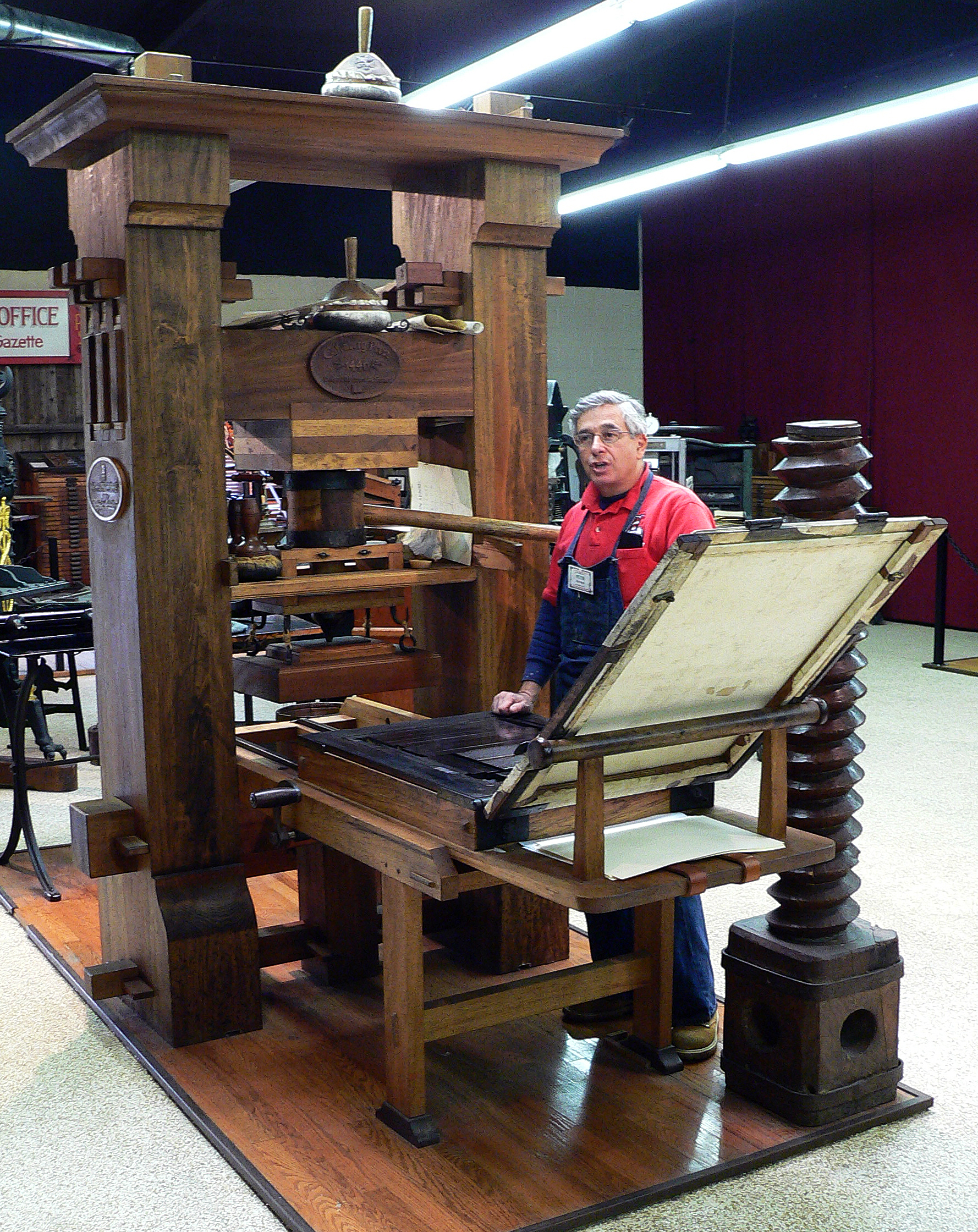
Replica of the Gutenberg press at the International Printing Museum in Carson, California

In the Muslim world, printing, especially in Arabic scripts, was strongly opposed throughout the early modern period, partially due to the high artistic renown of the art of traditional calligraphy. However, printing in Hebrew or Armenian script was often permitted. Thus, the first movable type printing in the Ottoman Empire was in Hebrew in 1493, after which both religious and non-religious texts were able to be printed in Hebrew. According to an imperial ambassador to Istanbul in the middle of the sixteenth century, it was a sin for the Turks, particularly Turkish Muslims, to print religious books. In 1515, Sultan Selim I issued a decree under which the practice of printing would be punishable by death. At the end of the sixteenth century, Sultan Murad III permitted the sale of non-religious printed books in Arabic characters, yet the majority were imported from Italy. Ibrahim Muteferrika, with help from Esad of Ioannina, established the first press for printing in Arabic in the Ottoman Empire, against opposition from the calligraphers and parts of the Ulama. It operated until 1742, producing altogether seventeen works, all of which were concerned with non-religious, utilitarian matters. Printing did not become common in the Islamic world until the 19th century.

Hebrew language printers were banned from printing guilds in some Germanic states; as a result, Hebrew printing flourished in Italy, beginning in 1470 in Rome, then spreading to other cities including Bari, Pisa, Livorno, and Mantua. Local rulers had the authority to grant or revoke licenses to publish Hebrew books, and many of those printed during this period carry the words 'con licenza de superiori' (indicating their printing having been officially licensed) on their title pages.

It was thought that the introduction of printing 'would strengthen religion and enhance the power of monarchs.' The majority of books were of a religious nature, with the church and crown regulating the content. The consequences of printing 'wrong' material were extreme. Meyrowitz used the example of William Carter who in 1584 printed a pro-Catholic pamphlet in Protestant-dominated England. The consequence of his action was hanging.

=== Social impact ===
Print gave a broader range of readers access to knowledge and enabled later generations to build directly on the intellectual achievements of earlier ones without the changes arising within verbal traditions. Print, according to Acton in his 1895 lecture On the Study of History, gave "assurance that the work of the Renaissance would last, that what was written would be accessible to all, that such an occultation of knowledge and ideas as had depressed the Middle Ages would never recur, that not an idea would be lost".

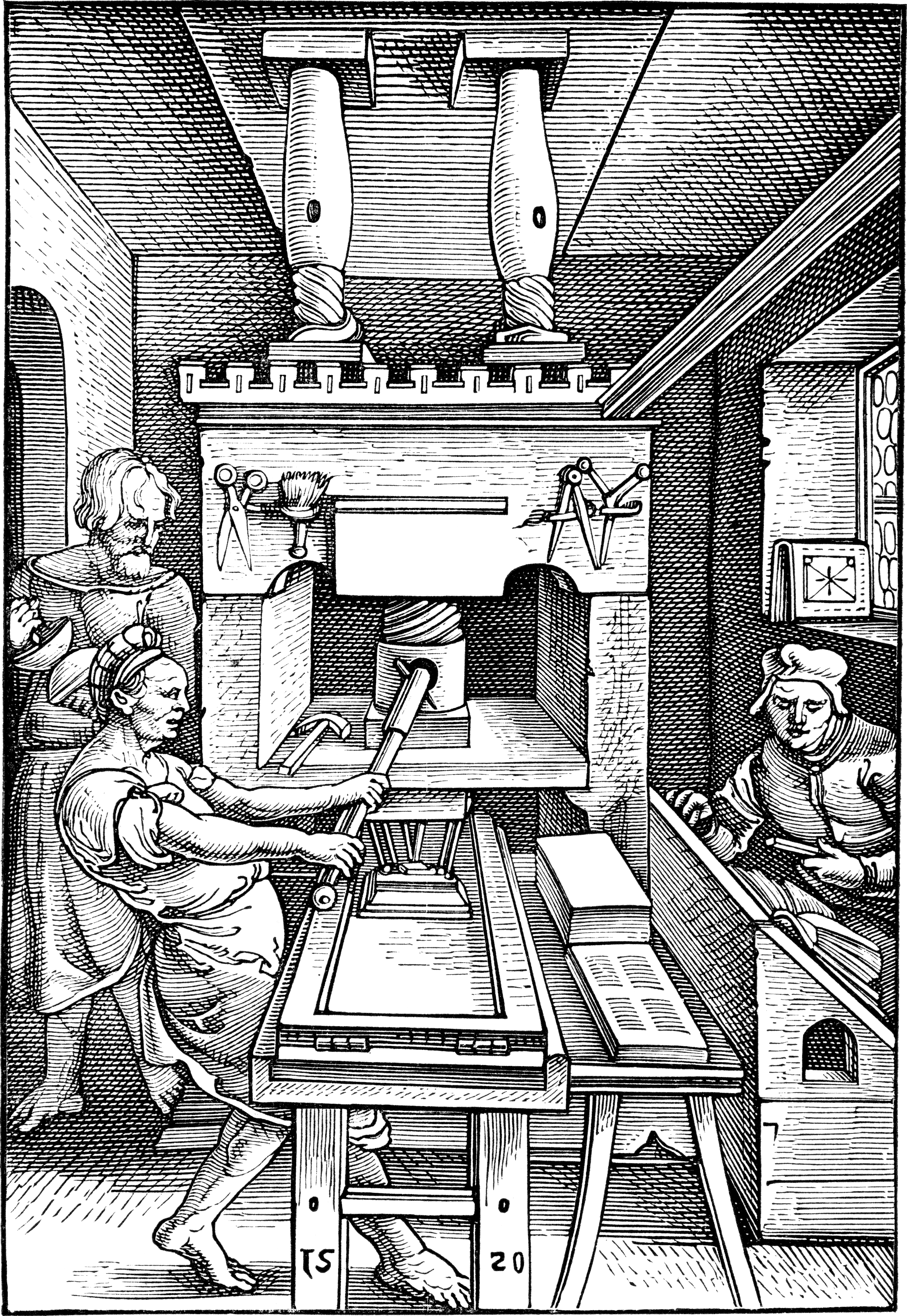
Bookprinting in the 16th century

Print was instrumental in changing the social nature of reading.

Elizabeth Eisenstein identifies two long-term effects of the invention of printing. She claims that print created a sustained and uniform reference for knowledge and allowed comparisons of incompatible views.

Asa Briggs and Peter Burke identify five kinds of reading that developed in relation to the introduction of print:

1. Critical reading: Because texts finally became accessible to the general population, critical reading emerged as people were able to form their own opinions on texts.
2. Dangerous reading: Reading was seen as a dangerous pursuit because it was considered rebellious and unsociable, especially in the case of women, because reading could stir up dangerous emotions such as love, and if women could read, they could read love notes.
3. Creative reading: Printing allowed people to read texts and interpret them creatively, often in very different ways than the author intended.
4. Extensive reading: Once print made a wide range of texts available, earlier habits of intensive reading of texts from start to finish began to change, and people began reading selected excerpts, allowing much more extensive reading on a wider range of topics.
5. Private reading: Reading was linked to the rise of individualism because, before print, reading was often a group event in which one person would read to a group. With print, both literacy and the availability of texts increased, and solitary reading became the norm.

The invention of printing also changed the occupational structure of European cities. Printers emerged as a new group of artisans for whom literacy was essential, while the much more labour-intensive occupation of the scribe naturally declined. Proof-correcting arose as a new occupation, while a rise in the numbers of booksellers and librarians naturally followed the explosion in the numbers of books.

=== Educational impact ===
Gutenberg's printing press had profound impacts on universities as well. Universities were influenced in their "language of scholarship, libraries, curriculum, [and] pedagogy".

==== The language of scholarship ====
Before the invention of the printing press, most written material was in Latin. However, after the invention of printing the number of books printed expanded as well as the vernacular. Latin was not replaced completely, but remained an international language until the eighteenth century.

==== Curriculum ====
The printed press changed university libraries in many ways. Professors were finally able to compare the opinions of different authors rather than being forced to look at only one or two specific authors. Textbooks themselves were also being printed in different levels of difficulty, rather than just one introductory text being made available.

== Comparison of printing methods ==
Comparison of printing methods
Printing process	Transfer method	Pressure applied	Drop size	Dynamic viscosity	Ink thickness on substrate	Notes	Cost-effective run length
Offset printing	rollers	1 MPa		40–100 Pa·s	0.5–1.5 μm	high print quality	> 5,000 (A3 trim size, sheet-fed) > 30,000 (A3 trim size, web-fed)
Rotogravure	rollers	3 MPa		50–200 mPa·s	0.8–8 μm	thick ink layers possible, excellent image reproduction, edges of letters and lines are jagged	> 500,000
Flexography	rollers	0.3 MPa		50–500 mPa·s	0.8–2.5 μm	high quality (now HD)	
Letterpress printing	platen	10 MPa		50–150 Pa·s	0.5–1.5 μm	slow drying	
Screen-printing	pressing ink through holes in screen			1000–10,000 mPa·s	< 12 μm	versatile method, low quality	
Electrophotography	electrostatics				5–10 μm	thick ink	
Liquid electrophotography	image formation by Electrostatics and transfer while fixing					High PQ, excellent image reproduction, wide range of media, very thin image	
Inkjet printer	thermal		5–30 picolitres (pl)	1–5 mPa·s	< 0.5 μm	special paper required to reduce bleeding	< 350 (A3 trim size)
Inkjet printer	piezoelectric		4–30 pl	5–20 mPa s	< 0.5 μm	special paper required to reduce bleeding	< 350 (A3 trim size)
Inkjet printer	continuous		5–100 pl	1–5 mPa·s	< 0.5 μm	special paper required to reduce bleeding	< 350 (A3 trim size)
Transfer-print	thermal transfer film or water release decal					mass-production method of applying an image to a curved or uneven surface	
Aerosol-jet printer	Aerosolized inks carried by gas		2–5 microns in diameter	1–1000 mPa s	< 1 μm	Good printing resolution, High quality	

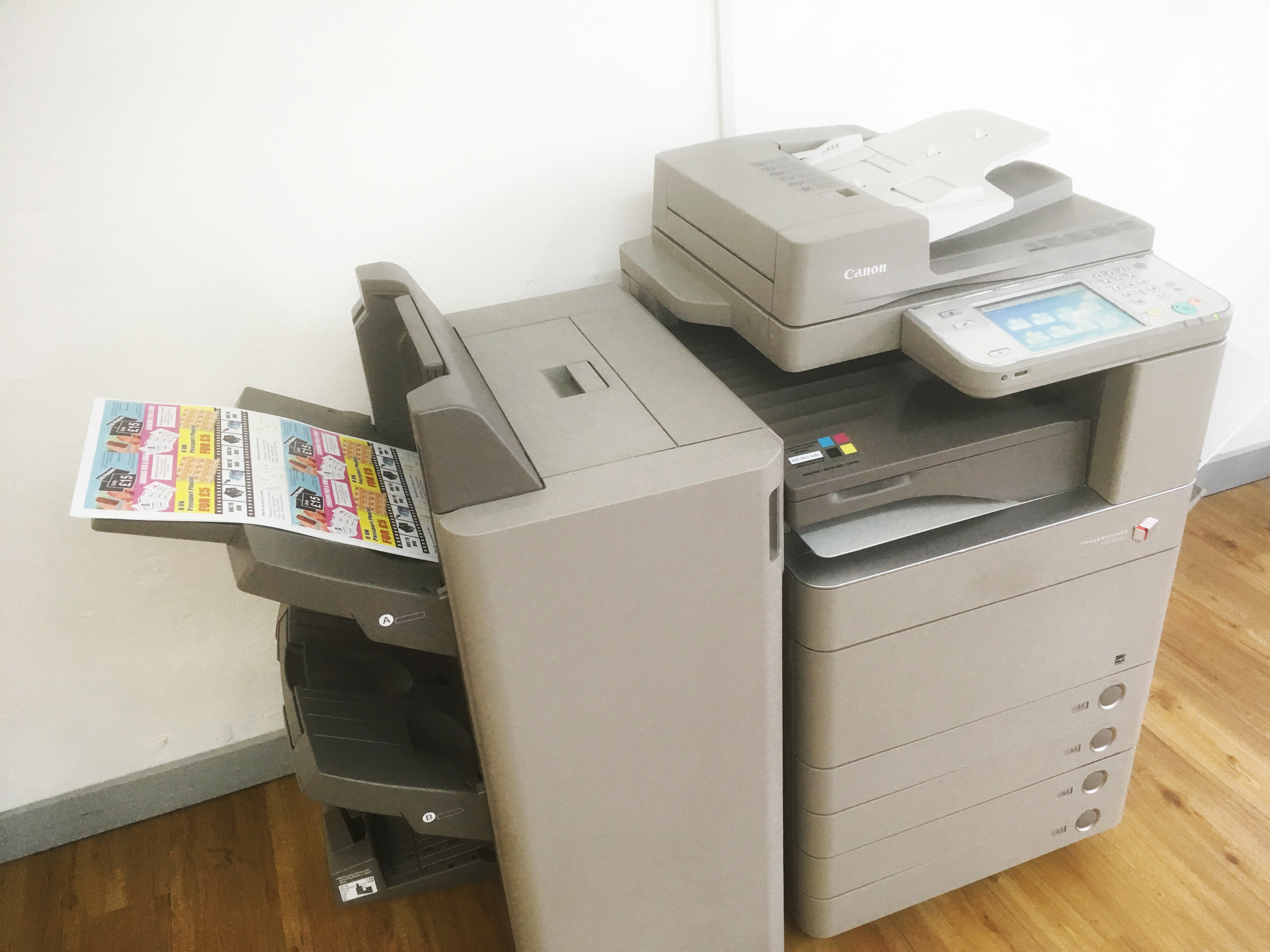
Digital printers can now not just print leaflets and documents, but also scan, fax, copy and make booklets plus more.

== Digital printing ==
By 2005, digital printing accounted for approximately 9% of the 45 trillion pages printed annually around the world.

Printing at home, an office, or an engineering environment is subdivided into:

- small format (up to ledger size paper sheets), as used in business offices and libraries
- wide format (up to 3' or 914mm wide rolls of paper), as used in drafting and design establishments.

Some of the more common printing technologies are:

- blueprint – and related chemical technologies
- daisy wheel – where pre-formed characters are applied individually
- dot-matrix – which produces arbitrary patterns of dots with an array of printing studs
- line printing – where formed characters are applied to the paper by lines
- heat transfer – such as early fax machines or modern receipt printers that apply heat to special paper, which turns black to form the printed image
- inkjet – including bubble-jet, where ink is sprayed onto the paper to create the desired image
- electrophotography – where toner is attracted to a charged image and then developed
- laser – a type of xerography where the charged image is written pixel by pixel using a laser
- solid ink printer – where solid sticks of ink are melted to make liquid ink or toner

Vendors typically stress the total cost to operate the equipment, involving complex calculations that include all cost factors involved in the operation as well as the capital equipment costs, amortization, etc. For the most part, toner systems are more economical than inkjet in the long run, even though inkjets are less expensive in the initial purchase price.

Professional digital printing (using toner) primarily uses an electrical charge to transfer toner or liquid ink to the substrate onto which it is printed. Digital print quality has steadily improved from early color and black and white copiers to sophisticated color digital presses such as the Xerox iGen3, the Kodak Nexpress, the HP Indigo Digital Press series, and the InfoPrint 5000. The iGen3 and Nexpress use toner particles and the Indigo uses liquid ink. The InfoPrint 5000 is a full-color, continuous forms inkjet drop-on-demand printing system. All handle variable data, and rival offset in quality. Digital offset presses are also called direct imaging presses, although these presses can receive computer files and automatically turn them into print-ready plates, they cannot insert variable data.

Small press and fanzines generally use digital printing. Prior to the introduction of cheap photocopying, the use of machines such as the spirit duplicator, hectograph, and mimeograph was common.

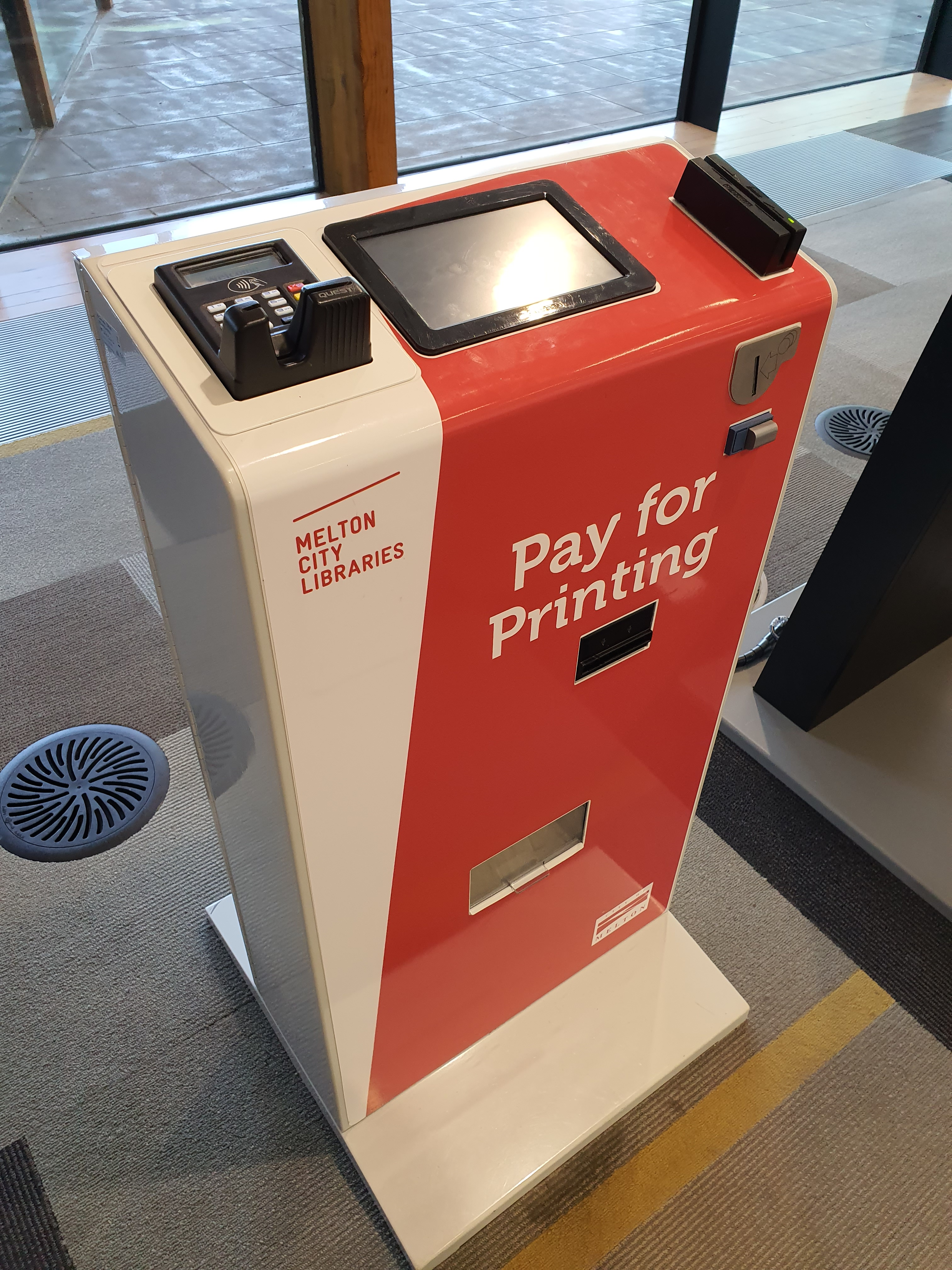
Printing payment self service kiosk

== 3D printing ==
3D printing is a form of manufacturing technology where physical objects are created from three-dimensional digital models using 3D printers. The objects are created by laying down or building up many thin layers of material in succession. The technique is also known as additive manufacturing, rapid prototyping, or fabricating.

In the 1980s, 3D printing techniques were considered suitable only for the production of functional or aesthetic prototypes, and a more appropriate term for it at the time was rapid prototyping. As of 2019, the precision, repeatability, and material range of 3D printing have increased to the point that some 3D printing processes are considered viable as an industrial-production technology, whereby the term additive manufacturing can be used synonymously with 3D printing. One of the key advantages of 3D printing is the ability to produce very complex shapes or geometries that would be otherwise infeasible to construct by hand, including hollow parts or parts with internal truss structures to reduce weight. Fused deposition modeling (FDM), which uses a continuous filament of a thermoplastic material, is the most common 3D printing process in use as of 2020.
