= Pad printing =

Technique used for printing images onto 3D surfaces

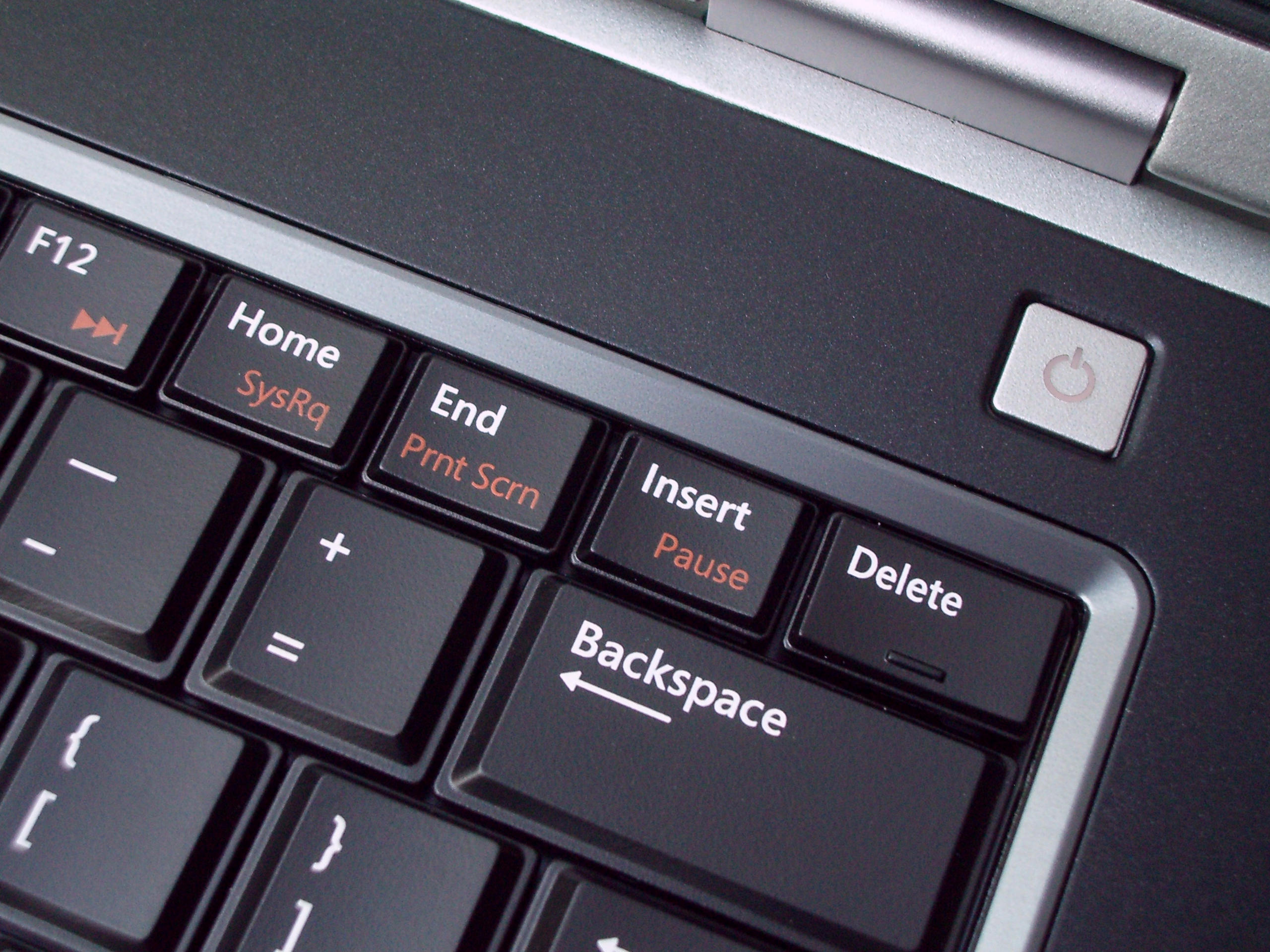
A pad printed keyboard

Diagram of pad printing, with cliché (1), pad (2), knife (3), squeegee (4), printing ink (5) and print object (6)

Pad printing (also called tampography) is a printing process that can transfer a 2-D image onto a 3-D object (e.g., pottery). This is accomplished using an indirect offset (gravure) printing process that involves an image being transferred from the cliché via a silicone pad onto a substrate. Pad printing is used for printing on otherwise difficult to print on products in many industries including medical, automotive, promotional, apparel, and electronic objects, as well as appliances, sports equipment and toys. It can also be used to deposit functional materials such as conductive inks, adhesives, dyes and lubricants.

Physical changes within the ink film both on the cliché and on the pad allow it to leave the etched image area in favor of adhering to the pad, and to subsequently release from the pad in favor of adhering to the substrate.

The unique properties of the silicone pad enable it to pick the image up from a flat plane and transfer it to a variety of surfaces, such as flat, cylindrical, spherical, compound angles, textures, concave, or convex surfaces.

== History ==
While crude forms of pad printing have existed for centuries, it was not until the twentieth century that the technology became suitable for widespread use.

The Murray Curvex printing process, introduced in the late 1940s and early 1950s by the British firm Malkin Tile Works in collaboration with engineers like G.L. Murray, revolutionized the ceramic industry by automating the decoration of curved surfaces. Before this innovation, complex patterns on dinnerware were largely applied by hand or via labor-intensive tissue-transfer methods. The process utilized a soft, pliable gelatin or silicone "bomb" (a rounded pad) that would pick up ceramic ink from an engraved flat plate and then compress it onto the irregular surface of a plate, bowl, or cup. This development was a critical precursor to modern pad printing (tampography), allowing for high-speed, consistent production that significantly reduced labor costs while maintaining intricate detail. By the mid-20th century, the Murray Curvex machine became a staple in the Staffordshire Potteries, enabling manufacturers like Wedgwood and Johnson Brothers to meet the booming global demand for decorated earthenware.

An early application was first gaining in the watch-making industry following World War II, developments in the late 1960s and early 1970s, such as silicone pads and more advanced equipment, made the printing method far more practical. The ability to print on formerly unprintable surfaces caught the imaginations of engineers and designers, and as a result pad printing exploded into the mass production marketplace.

== Process ==
=== Cycle ===
Cycles of pad printing on plates

1. From the home position, the sealed ink cup (an inverted cup containing ink) sits over the etched artwork area of the printing plate, covering the image and filling it with ink.
2. The sealed ink cup moves away from the etched artwork area, taking all excess ink and exposing the etched image, which is filled with ink. The top layer of ink becomes tacky as soon as it is exposed to the air; that is how the ink adheres to the transfer pad and later to the substrate.
3. The transfer pad presses down onto the printing plate momentarily. As the pad is compressed, it pushes air outward and causes the ink to lift (transfer) from the etched artwork area onto the pad.
4. As the transfer pad lifts away, the tacky ink film inside the etched artwork area is picked up on the pad. A small amount of ink remains in the printing plate.
5. As the transfer pad moves forward, the ink cup also moves to cover the etched artwork area on the printing plate. The ink cup again fills the etched artwork image on the plate with ink in preparation for the next cycle.
6. The transfer pad compresses down onto the substrate, transferring the ink layer picked up from the printing plate to the substrate surface. Then, it lifts off the substrate and returns to the home position, thus completing one print cycle.

=== Plate and ink interface technologies ===
==== Open inkwell system ====
Open ink well systems, the older method of pad printing, used an ink trough for the ink supply, which was located behind the printing plate. A flood bar pushed a pool of ink over the plate, and a doctor blade removes the ink from the plate surface, leaving ink on the etched artwork area ready for the pad to pick up.

==== Sealed ink cup system ====
Sealed ink cup systems employ a sealed container which acts as the ink supply, flood bar and doctor blade all at the same time. A ceramic ring with a highly polished working edge provides the seal against the printing plate.

=== Printing pad ===
Pads are three-dimensional objects typically molded of silicone rubber. They function as a transfer vehicle, picking up ink from the printing plate, and transferring it to the part (substrate). They vary in shape and diameter depending on the application.

There are two main shape groups: "round pads" and long narrow pads called "bar pads". Pads are also made in other shapes, called "loaf pads". Within each group there are three size categories: small, medium, and large size pads. It is also possible to engineer custom-shaped pads to meet special application requirements.

=== Image plate ===
Image plates (also called clichés or print plates) are used to contain the desired artwork "image" etched in their surface. Their function is to hold ink in this etched cavity, allowing the pad to pick up this ink as a film in the shape of the artwork, which is then transferred to the substrate.

There are two main types of printing plate materials: photopolymer and steel. Photopolymer plates are the most popular, as they are easy to use. These are typically used in short to medium production runs. Steel plates come in two forms: thin steel for medium- to long-run applications, and thick steel for very long runs. Both steel plate types are generally processed by the plate supplier, as this requires specialized equipment.

Multicolor applications can be executed by the coordinated use of several clichés. One image can contain several contrast colors (monochrome) by applying different engraving depths and/or grid resolutions.

=== Printing ink ===
Ink is used to mark or decorate parts. It comes in different chemical families to match the type of material to be printed (please consult the substrate compatibility chart for selection).

Pad printing inks are often "solvent-based" and require mixing with additives before use. They typically seem dry to the touch within seconds although complete drying (cure) might take a substantially longer period of time. There are FDA approved edible variants that have been developed for human consumption and more ecological variants to reduce the environmental impact.

There are many more options. Inks that cure via the use of ultraviolet light are convenient for certain applications. UV inks will not fully cure until UV light hits the ink. UV curable ink can be wiped off many substrates when mistakes are made. They can be cured with UV light in as fast as 1 second of light exposure. This depends on the ink, substrate and the light power and spectrum. UV inks can be reused as the pot life can be high as long as the ink stays clean, blocked from UV light and hasn't broken down from sitting. This same feature makes it easier to clean than some solvent and epoxy like two part component inks. Also there are heat curable inks, which work in much the same way as UV in the sense that there is a "trigger" that cures the ink when pulled. Two-component inks usually have a pot life of only a few hours or so. They must be disposed of when they cannot be revived (by means of retarders etc.)

Climatic conditions will significantly affect the performance of any pad printing ink, especially the open ink well style printers. Too dry conditions can lead to faster evaporation of solvents causing the ink to thicken prematurely and too much moisture can lead to ink issues of "clumping" or something similar. Also the climate can affect other aspects of the printing process such as ink pick up and release from the plate to the pad to the substrate, as well as polymer plate to blade chattering or binding due to humidity.

=== Substrate ===
Substrate is the technical term used to address any parts or materials to be printed. Fixtures vary in materials and complexity depending on the application. Substrates need to be clean and free from surface contamination to allow proper ink adhesion.

== Making of printing plates ==
There are two main techniques used to create a printing plate. The traditional technique requires a UV exposure unit and involves photo exposure with film positives and chemical etching. A second technique known as computer to plate requires a laser engraver and involves automated laser etching. The latter technique is more convenient for short production delays, high precision, stable quality control.

Both techniques can be applied on a specialized polymer or steel plate. The standard cycle life that can be expected out of a polymer plate is quite low (50,000 impressions on the high end). By comparison, a hardened steel plate can easily last for over 1 million impressions.

== Printing application examples ==
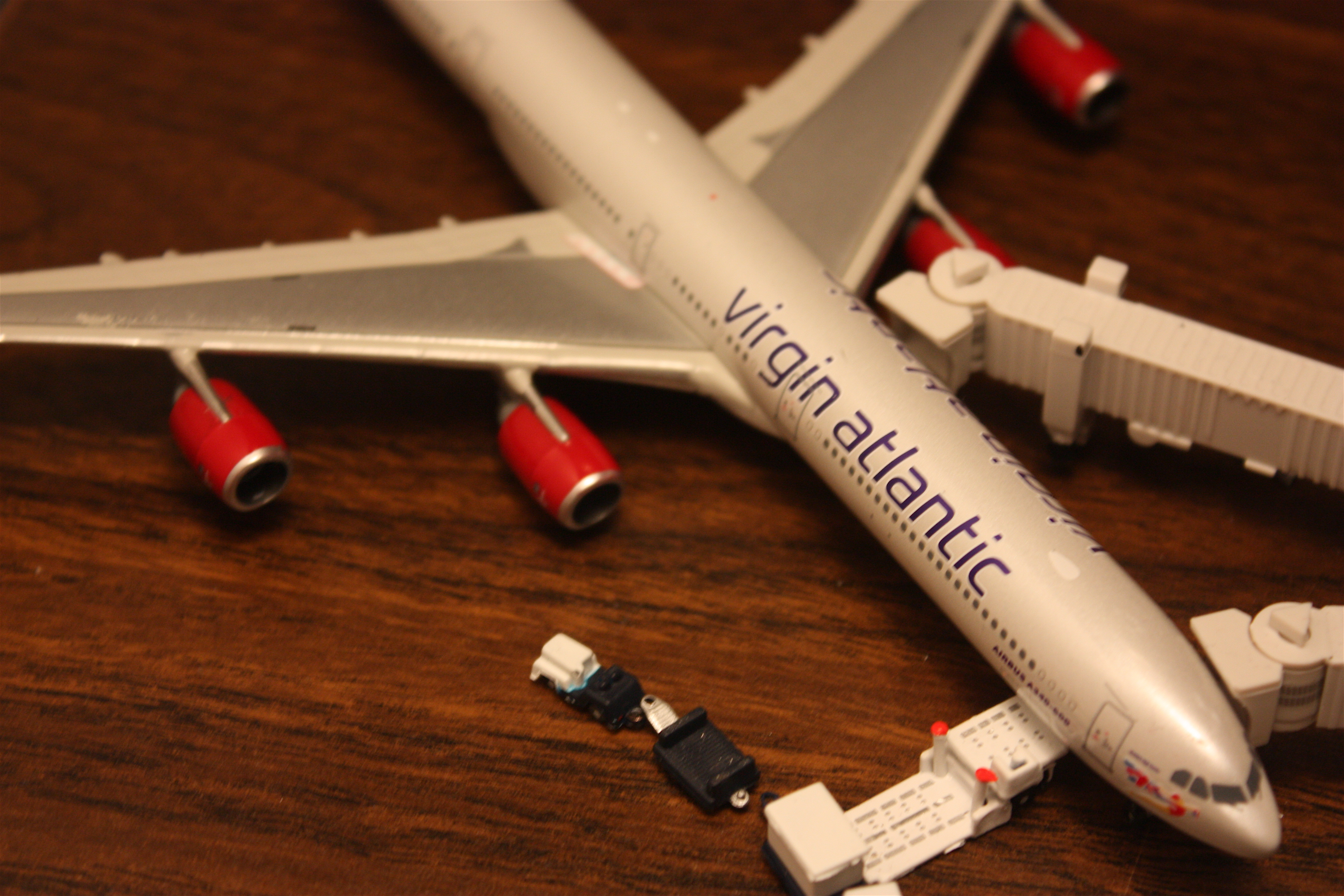
Tampography is commonly used to print decals onto diecast models, such as this model Airbus A340, as the resultant printed decals are resistant to fading.

Pad printing is typically used for applications where print quality, precision or a complex shape is involved.

- Medical devices (syringes, surgical instruments, etc.)
- Implantable & in body medical items (catheter tubes, contact lenses, etc.)
- Pharmaceutics (pills)
- Candy
- Wrist watch dials
- Cosmetic packaging (eyeliner, perfume bottles, etc.)
- Caps and closures (drink bottle caps, etc.)
- Golf ball logos/graphics
- Hockey pucks
- Decorative designs/graphics appearing on toys (Hot Wheels or Matchbox toy cars, balls, etc.)
- Automotive parts (turn signal indicators, panel controls, etc.)
- Letters on computer keyboards and calculator keys
- TV and computer monitors
- Identification labels and serial numbers for many applications
- Apparel industry for printing labels directly on clothing
- Promotional gifts and give-aways
- Shoe heels
