= Overwrap =

Method of packaging

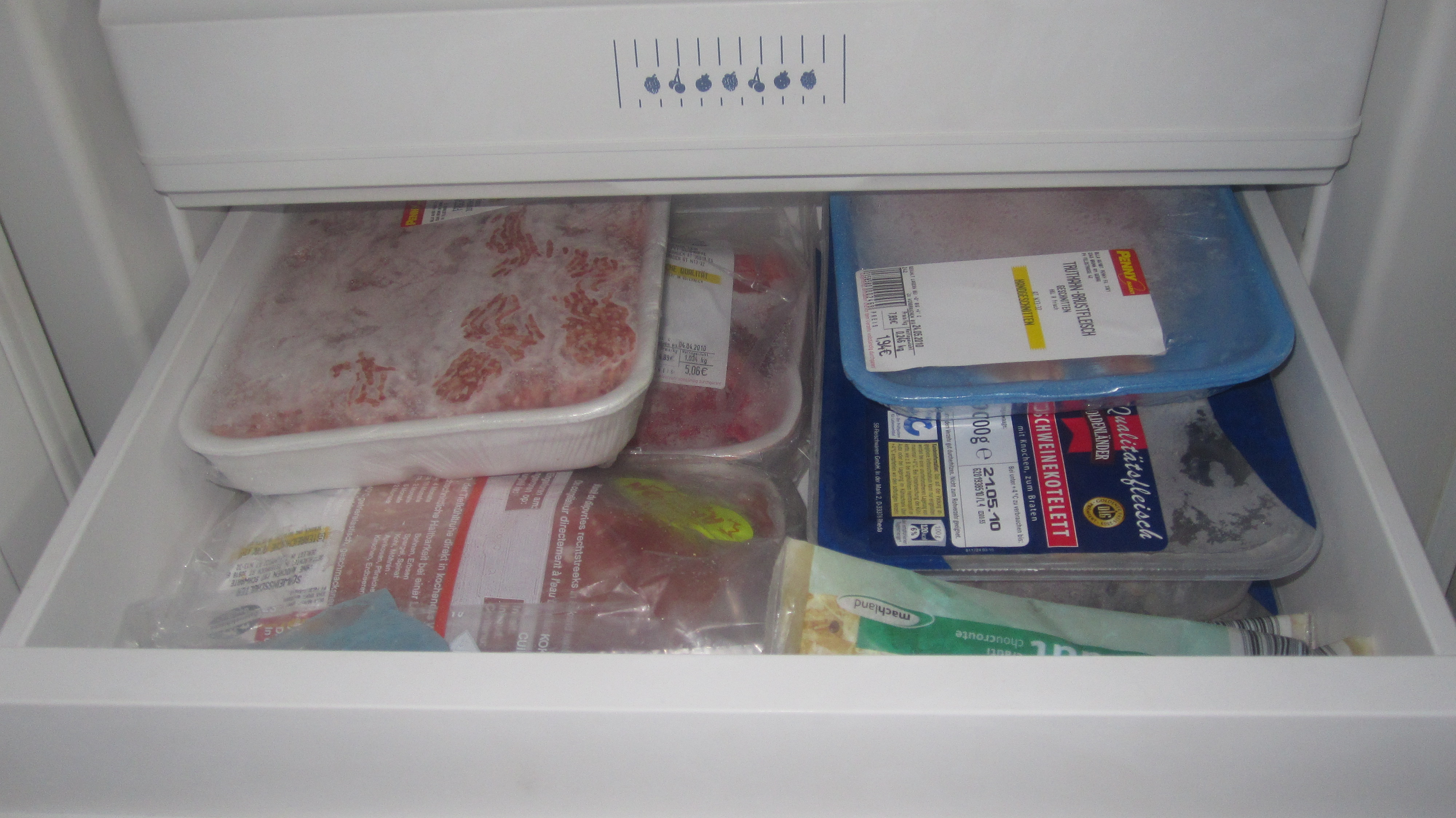
Trays of frozen meat with overwraps

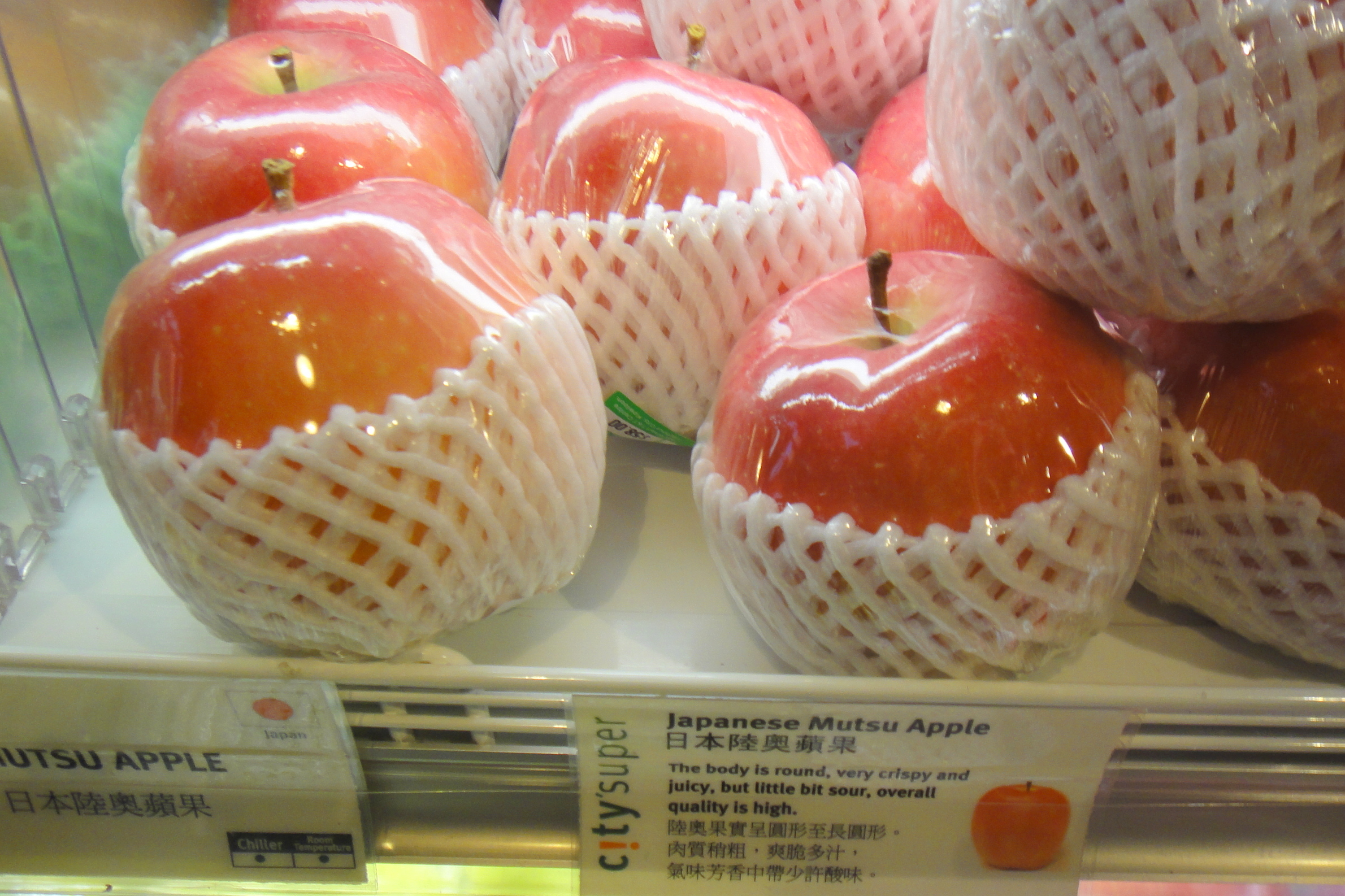
Apples in overwrap of shrink film with foam cushioning

An overwrap or wrap is a method of sealing a contained product, typically as part of retail packaging. It is often made of plastic film (sometimes called polywrapping) or paper. The wrap is applied over the bare product or can be applied over another form of packaging. It is typically used to protect products, but can be used decoratively.

== Functions ==
An overwrap can be used for several purposes or functions:

- Combine two or more smaller packages into a larger multi-pack
- Keep a package or item clean
- Help prevent package pilferage or premature opening of the package
- Help provide a tamper indicating seal
- Help keep insects out of a package
- Obscure a package for distribution, sale, or gifting
- Help provide an authentication seal
- Help provide grease resistance or water resistance
- Keep an item, such as magazines, clean and intact during shipment; provide an address label that does not damage the item
- Provide graphics, advertising, warnings, instructions, bar codes, etc.
- Provide odor control by preventing odor leakage and cross-contamination.

== Types of overwraps ==
=== Shrink wrap ===
Shrink wrap is a material made up of polymer plastic film. When heat is applied it shrinks tightly over whatever it is covering. Heat can be applied with a hand held heat gun (electric or gas) or the product and film can pass through a heat tunnel. Most shrink films are polyethylene.

=== Film wrap ===
Plastic films, usually polyethylene or polypropylene, can be wrapped around an item and attached with adhesive, PSA tape, or heat seals. Sometimes the film is in the form of a plastic bag which is sealed around the item.

=== Decorative wrap ===
Wraps can be either exclusively for visual appeal (decoration) or be protective in nature but encompass a decorative element such as a printed design.

=== Paper wrap ===
Kraft paper and a variety of other papers can be used to overwrap items in a package or to overwrap a package. Some papers provide abrasion protection for packaged items. Sealing can be by adhesive, tapes, heat seals, etc. Some papers also have grease resistance or are saturated with volatile corrosion inhibitors, etc.

== See also ==
- Shrink wrap
- Plastic wrap
- Plastic bag
