= Plastic repair welder =

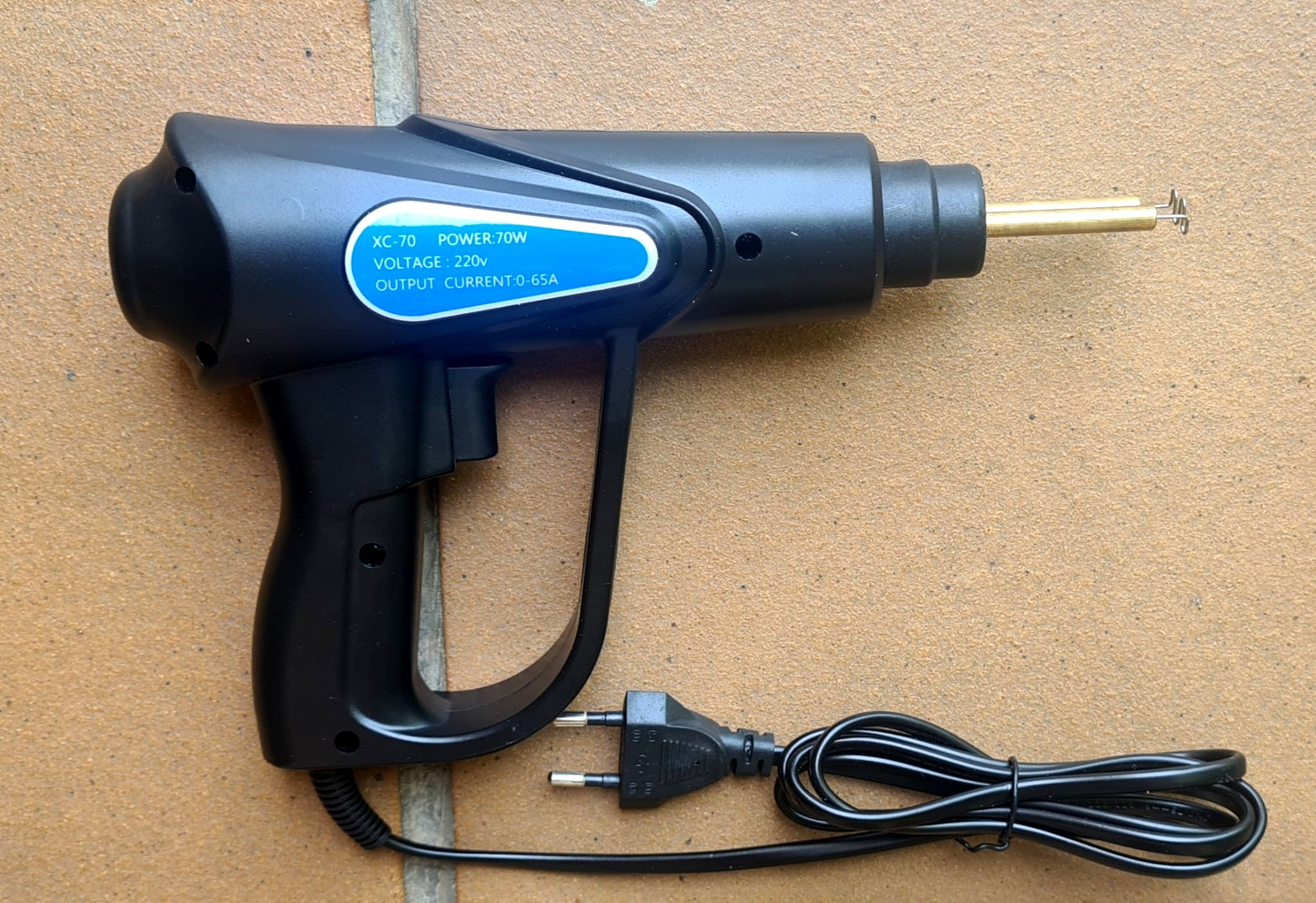
Plastic repair welder

A plastic repair welder (also called hot stapler, bumper welder, or metal insert welder ) is a power tool designed to repair thermoplastic plastic parts by inserting heated metal staples. It is widely used in body shops, plastics manufacturing and repair industries, as well as in domestic applications to restore damaged components, replacing hot air welding or adhesives or even ultrasonic welding.

Other alternative names

- English: plastic repair stapler, plastic bumper welder, hot stapler.

== Operating principle ==
The device works by heating metal staples (usually made of stainless steel or corrosion-resistant alloys) until they reach a controlled temperature (between 200°C and 500°C, depending on the model). These staples are inserted perpendicular to the fractured area of the plastic. a bumper or fender, partially melting the surrounding material. When cooled, the staple becomes embedded in the plastic, creating internal structural reinforcement. The surface can then be polished and treated with putties or paints to restore its original appearance.

== History and development ==
The technique emerged in the 1990s as an alternative to traditional hot air welding or adhesive methods. Its popularity increased with the massive use of plastics in the automotive industry, where bumpers ceased to be metal. Brands such as Uretech or Steinel were pioneers in marketing professional tools.

== Kits and applications ==
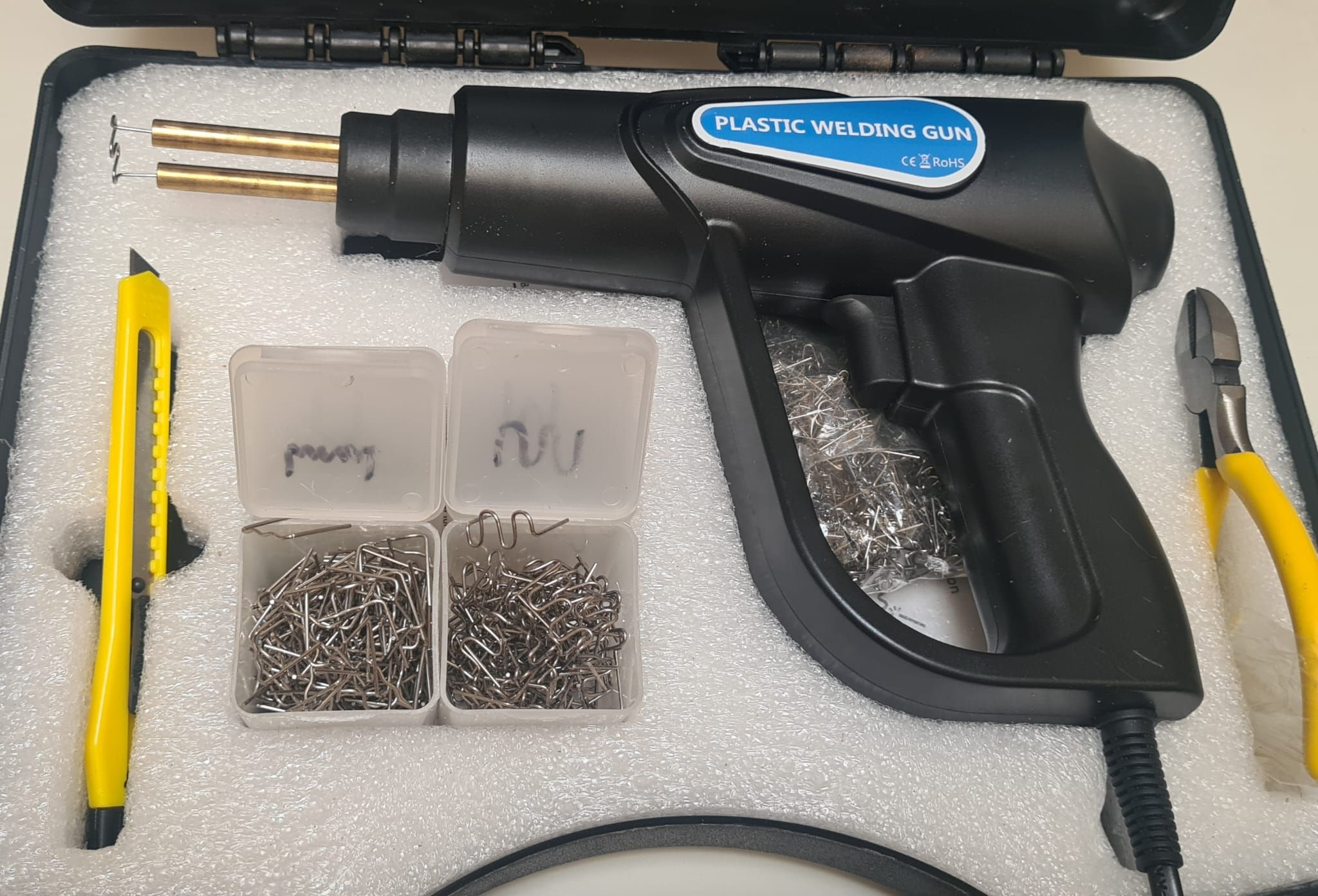
"Plastic welding gun" Kit

- Automotive: Repair of bumpers, motorcycle fairings, grilles, spoilers and headlight housings.
- Household appliances: Fixing housings of washing machines, vacuum cleaners or electronic equipment .
- Furniture: Restoration of plastic chairs, panels or decorative elements.
- Industry: Repair of tanks, ducts or machinery components made of thermoplastics such as PP, ABS or polycarbonate .

== Advantages and disadvantages ==
=== Advantages ===
- Economical: Avoids the complete replacement of expensive parts.
- Ecological: Reduces plastic waste by extending the useful life of components.
- Versatility: Compatible with multiple thermoplastics, including difficult-to-weld materials such as polypropylene (PP).
- Strength: Staples provide more durability than traditional adhesives or welds.

=== Disadvantages ===
- It is not effective on thermoset plastics (such as Bakelite ).
- It requires technical skill to avoid deformation due to excess heat.
- In parts subjected to high voltage, additional insulation may be required.

== Types of staples and consumables ==
Staples vary depending on:

- Material: Stainless steel, aluminum or special alloys.
- Shape: Straight, "T" or customized for curved areas.
- Size: Lengths between 10 mm and 25 mm, with thicknesses from 1 mm to 2.5 mm.

Some models include accessories such as interchangeable nozzles or digital temperature regulators.

== See also ==
- Ultrasonic welding
- Hot air gun
- Thermoforming

== Bibliography ==
- EDUARDO, ÁGUEDA CASADO (2024-08-28). Elementos amovibles y fijos no estructurales 4.ª edición 2024 (in Spanish). Ediciones Paraninfo, S.A. ISBN 978-84-283-6327-3.
