= Thermoforming =

Manufacturing process for molding plastic with heat

Animation of the thermoforming process.: 1. The plastic sheet is heated.; 2. The sheet is formed to a specific shape in a mold.; 3. The shapes are trimmed.

Thermoforming is a manufacturing process where a plastic sheet is heated to a pliable forming temperature, formed to a specific shape in a mold, and trimmed to create a usable product. The sheet, or "film" when referring to thinner gauges and certain material types, is heated in an oven to a high-enough temperature that permits it to be stretched into or onto a mold and cooled to a finished shape. Its simplified version is vacuum forming.

In its simplest form, a small tabletop or lab size machine can be used to heat small cut sections of plastic sheet and stretch it over a mold using vacuum. This method is often used for sample and prototype parts. In complex and high-volume applications, very large production machines are utilized to heat and form the plastic sheet and trim the formed parts from the sheet in a continuous high-speed process and can produce many thousands of finished parts per hour depending on the machine and mold size and the size of the parts being formed.

Thermoforming differs from injection molding, blow molding, rotational molding and other forms of processing plastics. Thin-gauge thermoforming is primarily the manufacture of disposable cups, containers, lids, trays, blisters, clamshells, and other products for the food, medical, and general retail industries. Thick-gauge thermoforming includes parts as diverse as vehicle door and dash panels, refrigerator liners, utility vehicle beds and plastic pallets.

Most thermoforming companies recycle their scrap and waste plastic, either by compressing in a baling machine or by feeding into a granulator (grinder) and producing ground flake, for sale to reprocessing companies or re-use in their own facility. Frequently, scrap and waste plastic from the thermoforming process is converted back into extruded sheet for forming again.

In-process thermoforming scrap and post-consumer thermoformed packaging present different recycling conditions. Trim scrap generated during manufacturing is generally a relatively clean and controlled material stream, while used packages may contain food residue, labels, adhesives, coatings, inks, or multilayer structures that can affect sorting and reprocessing. Recyclability therefore depends not only on the base polymer but also on the design and composition of the finished package.

== Procedure ==
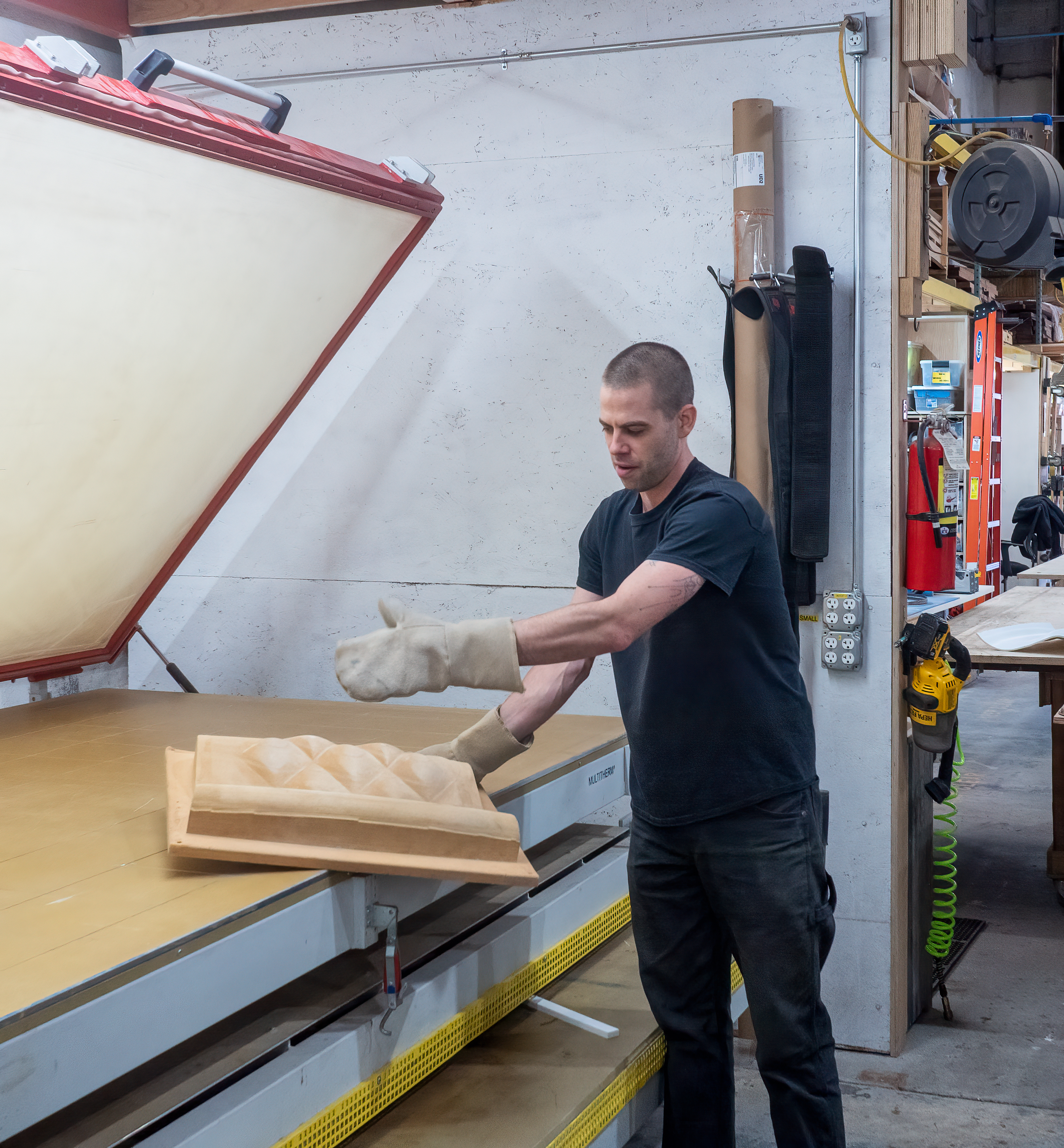
A person holds a mold in an open vacuum bed. A sheet of hot plastic will be placed on top and the bed sealed, pulling the plastic down over the mold.

In industrial production, the plastic sheet used for thermoforming is typically produced by a separate sheet-extrusion process. Polymer pellets are melted in an extruder, passed through a flat die, cooled and thickness-controlled, and then supplied to the thermoforming machine as rolls or fed directly from an inline extrusion system. Extrusion and thermoforming are therefore distinct but often connected manufacturing stages.

In the most common method of high-volume, continuous thermoforming of thin-gauge products, plastic sheet is fed from a roll or from an extruder into a set of indexing chains that incorporate pins, or spikes, that pierce the sheet and transport it through an oven for heating to forming temperature. The heated sheet then indexes into a form station where a mating mold and pressure-box close on the sheet, with vacuum then applied to remove trapped air and to pull the material into or onto the mold along with pressurized air to form the plastic to the detailed shape of the mold. (Plug-assists are typically used in addition to vacuum in the case of taller, deeper-draw formed parts in order to provide the needed material distribution and thicknesses in the finished parts.) In plug-assisted thermoforming, the heated sheet is initially pre-stretched by contact with a moving mechanical plug before the forming step is completed by air pressure. Process parameters investigated for their influence on the final wall-thickness distribution include sheet temperature, plug temperature, plug speed, plug displacement, plug shape, and air pressure. Cooling is an important stage of thermoforming because it affects cycle time, shrinkage, dimensional repeatability, warpage, and release from the mold. Production tooling may incorporate temperature-control channels or other cooling systems to stabilize the formed part before ejection. After a short form cycle, a burst of reverse air pressure is actuated from the vacuum side of the mold as the form tooling opens, commonly referred to as air-eject, to break the vacuum and assist the formed parts off of, or out of, the mold. A stripper plate may also be utilized on the mold as it opens for ejection of more detailed parts or those with negative-draft, undercut areas. The sheet containing the formed parts then indexes into a trim station on the same machine, where a die cuts the parts from the remaining sheet web or indexes into a separate trim press where the formed parts are trimmed. The sheet web remaining after the formed parts are trimmed is typically wound onto a take-up reel or fed into an inline granulator for recycling.

== Developments ==
Microprocessor and computer controls on more modern machinery allow for greatly increased process control and repeatability of same-job setups from one production run with the ability to save oven heater and process timing settings between jobs. The ability to place formed sheets into an inline trim station for more precise trim registration has been improved due to the common use of electric servo motors for chain indexing versus air cylinders, gear racks, and clutches on older machines. Electric servo motors are also used on some modern and more sophisticated forming machines for actuation of the machine platens where form and trim tooling are mounted, rather than air cylinders which have traditionally been the industry standard, giving more precise control over closing and opening speeds and timing of the tooling. Quartz and radiant-panel oven heaters generally provide more precise and thorough sheet heating over older cal-rod type heaters, and better allow for zoning of ovens into areas of adjustable heat.

A new technology, ToolVu, has been developed to provide real-time feedback on thermoformer machines. This stand-alone system connects directly to the thermoformer and utilizes multiple sensors to record production-run data in real time including air pressure, temperature, tool strain gauge and other specifications. The system sends out multiple warnings and alerts whenever pre-set production parameters are compromised during a run. This reduces machine down time, lowers startup time and decreases startup scrap.

An integral part of the thermoforming process is the tooling, which is specific to each part that is to be produced. Thin-gauge thermoforming as described above is almost always performed on in-line machines and typically requires molds, plug assists, pressure boxes and all mounting plates as well as the trim tooling and stacker parts that pertain to the job. Thick or heavy-gauge thermoforming also requires tooling specific to each part, but because the part size can be very large, the molds can be cast aluminum or some other composite material as well as machined aluminum as in thin gauge. Typically, thick-gauge parts must be trimmed on CNC routers or hand trimmed using saws or hand routers. Even the most sophisticated thermoforming machine is limited to the quality of the tooling. Some large thermoforming manufacturers choose to have design and tool making facilities in house while others will rely on outside tool-making shops to build the tooling.

== Thin-gauge and heavy-gauge (thick) thermoforming ==
There are two general thermoforming process categories. Sheet thickness less than 1.5 mm (0.060 inches) is usually delivered to the thermoforming machine from rolls or from a sheet extruder. Thin-gauge roll-fed or inline extruded thermoforming applications are dominated by rigid or semi-rigid disposable packaging. Sheet thicknesses greater than 3 mm (0.120 inches) are usually delivered to the forming machine by hand or an auto-feed method already cut to final dimensions. Heavy, or thick-gauge, cut sheet thermoforming applications are primarily used as permanent structural components. There is a small but growing medium-gauge market that forms sheet 1.5 mm to 3 mm in thickness.

Heavy-gauge forming utilizes the same basic process as continuous thin-gauge sheet forming, typically draping the heated plastic sheet over a mold. Many heavy-gauge forming applications use vacuum only in the form process, although some use two halves of mating form tooling and include air pressure to help form. Aircraft windscreens and machine gun turret windows spurred the advance of heavy-gauge forming technology during World War II. Heavy-gauge parts are used as cosmetic surfaces on permanent structures such as kiosks, automobiles, trucks, medical equipment, material handling equipment, refrigerators, spas, and shower enclosures, and electrical and electronic equipment. Unlike most thin-gauge thermoformed parts, heavy-gauge parts are often hand-worked after forming for trimming to final shape or for additional drilling, cutting, or finishing, depending on the product. Heavy-gauge products typically are of a "permanent" end use nature, while thin-gauge parts are more often designed to be disposable or recyclable and are primarily used to package or contain a food item or product. Heavy-gauge thermoforming is typically used for production quantities of 250 to 3000 annually, with lower tooling costs and faster product development than competing plastic technologies like injection molding.

Olimunllum CF/PEEK is obtained by thick gauge thermoforming of thin layers of previously impregnated fibers to form fully consolidated sheets. The main difference from custom-made composite plates lies in the standardized orientation of the reinforcing fibers, the standardized weight content of the polymer and standardized sheet thicknesses. This allows easy design and post-processing using identical or similar tools as commonly used when working with metallic light-weight materials like aluminium, titanium and steel.

== Types of moulds ==
- Plaster of Paris mould
- Wooden mould
- Plastic mould
- Aluminium mould

== Industry ==
The more than US$10 billion North American market has traditionally been 3/4 thin gauge and 1/4 heavy gauge. In 2003 there were about 150 thin-gauge thermoformers in North America. Sixty percent formed proprietary products. Thirty percent were custom formers and 10 percent were OEMs with in-house forming capability. There were nearly a dozen thin-gauge formers having annual sales of at least $100 million. The largest had annual sales in excess of $1,000 million. There were about 250 heavy-gauge formers in North America. Nearly all were custom formers. Only two or three heavy-gauge formers had annual sales of more than $100 million. The largest had annual sales of about $140 million. Beaverton, Michigan, is known as the Plastic Thermoforming capital of the world fueled by the proximity of Dow Chemical Company of Midland, Michigan.

== See also ==
- Blister pack
- Blow moulding
- Microthermoforming
- Molding (process)
- Packaging
- Thermoplastic
- Hot stapler
- Hot air gun
