= Microthermoforming =

Microthermoforming is the abbreviation for microscopic or microscale thermoforming, or, more precisely, for thermoforming of microproducts or microstructure products. Microstructure products means products that have structures in the micrometre range and have their technical function provided by the shape of the microstructure [1]. Thermoforming [2] in turn means shaping of heated and therefore softened semi finished products in the form of thermoplastic polymer films or plates with their edges fixed by three-dimensional stretching. Shaping is carried out mainly by forming the films or plates into female moulds (negative forming) or over male moulds (positive forming). While the other polymer microreplication processes such as micro injection moulding or (vacuum) hot embossing are primary forming processes where forming occurs already in a molten, liquid phase of the heated polymer material, microthermoforming is a secondary forming process where forming occurs in a strongly softened, but still solid phase of the heated polymer.

Moulds for polymer microreplication in general and in particular for microthermoforming can be fabricated by various methods such as mechanical micromachining, lithographic based methods in combination with electroplating (see also the so-called 'LIGA' process) and wet or dry etching. And they can be fabricated of various materials such as metal, silicon and glass.

== State of the art ==
For several years now, at Karlsruhe Institute of Technology (KIT), a pressure or high pressure (thermo)forming process is used to fabricate film microchips for capillary electrophoresis (CE) [3–5] and for three-dimensional cell cultivation [6–8]. The process is derived from the macroscopic trapped sheet forming process [2]. This is a simple variation of vacuum or pressure forming without prestretching, i.e. a single stage forming, into a female mould with heating of the plastic sheet using a contact heating plate inside the forming station. The forming air is supplied via through holes in the heating plate. Still in a laboratory scale process, diverse thermoplastic films also from biodegradable polymers such as polycaprolactone (PCL) with thicknesses typically between 20 and 100 μm are thermoformed. This is performed with gas pressures up to 5 MPa into mechanically micromachined cavities of plate shaped micromoulds from brass.

First examples of processes coming near to something that could be called 'microthermoforming' originate from the second half of the nineties. So, in 1993, dome shaped polymer microstructures for use in electrical membrane switches were fabricated [9]. This was done between a mating upper and lower metal emboss die with a concave and a convex detail, respectively, first in a hot, then in a second cold press. And in 1999, corrugated sheet like polymer microstructures for use e.g. in electrostatic actuators were fabricated [10]. This was also done between heated tools and counter tools, namely in discontinuous processes between stamps or in continuous processes between rollers. Partly, the counter tool was a soft one in the form of a thicker, unpatterned film or plate made from an easily deformable, e.g. elastomeric material which is able to assume the shape of the hard, metallic tool. In 2006, at the School of Polymer, Textile and Fiber Engineering (PTFE) of the Georgia Institute of Technology (GIT), the same technology approach was used to fabricate similar corrugated sheet like structures in a so-called 'rubber-assisted hot embossing process' [11].

== Features and applications ==
The microthermoforming process including its products can have all the advantageous properties of the powerful macroscopic production process. Moreover, the thermoformed microparts have additional, specific properties appearing only in microscale dimensions and resulting from their unusual morphology. Thermoformed e.g. microfluidic structures have free standing microcavities such as channels and reservoirs and they are thin walled partly in the range of a few micrometers. Specific properties of thermoformed microparts are, amongst others, their high flexibility, their small volume and mass, their low thermal resistance and heat capacity, and their low light absorbance and background fluorescence. Morphology and properties of these microparts now can result in improved or even new, so far unthought of applications.

Compared to the other microreplication processes, in microthermoforming, modifications of the film to be formed remain preserved beyond the forming step due to the already mentioned material coherence during this secondary forming process. This enables surface and bulk modification and functionalisation of the three-dimensionally formed films or membranes, namely as highly resolved micro- and nanopatterns, and all side, i.e. on hardly accessible side walls and even behind undercuts. Thus, e.g. thermoformed chips for three-dimensional cell cultivation can be provided with pores, cell adhesion patterns [6–8], surface topologies and electrodes [12].

Future application fields for microthermoforming are expected to be

- generally life sciences, e.g. flexible film microchips such as μTAS (Micro Total Analysis Systems) and LOC (Lab-on-a-chip) devices, possibly in continuous format and combined with polytronic circuits, also as human implants
- especially tissue engineering, e.g. film substrates or scaffolds for three-dimensional cell cultivation in fundamental research, medical diagnosis, pharmaceutical active substance research, and clinical research and therapy, particularly if integrated in standard laboratory platforms such as petri dishes and microtitre plates
- micropackaging, e.g. micro sensor and actuator housings or caps
- smart textiles etc.
