= Six-pack rings =

Plastic rings in beverage packaging

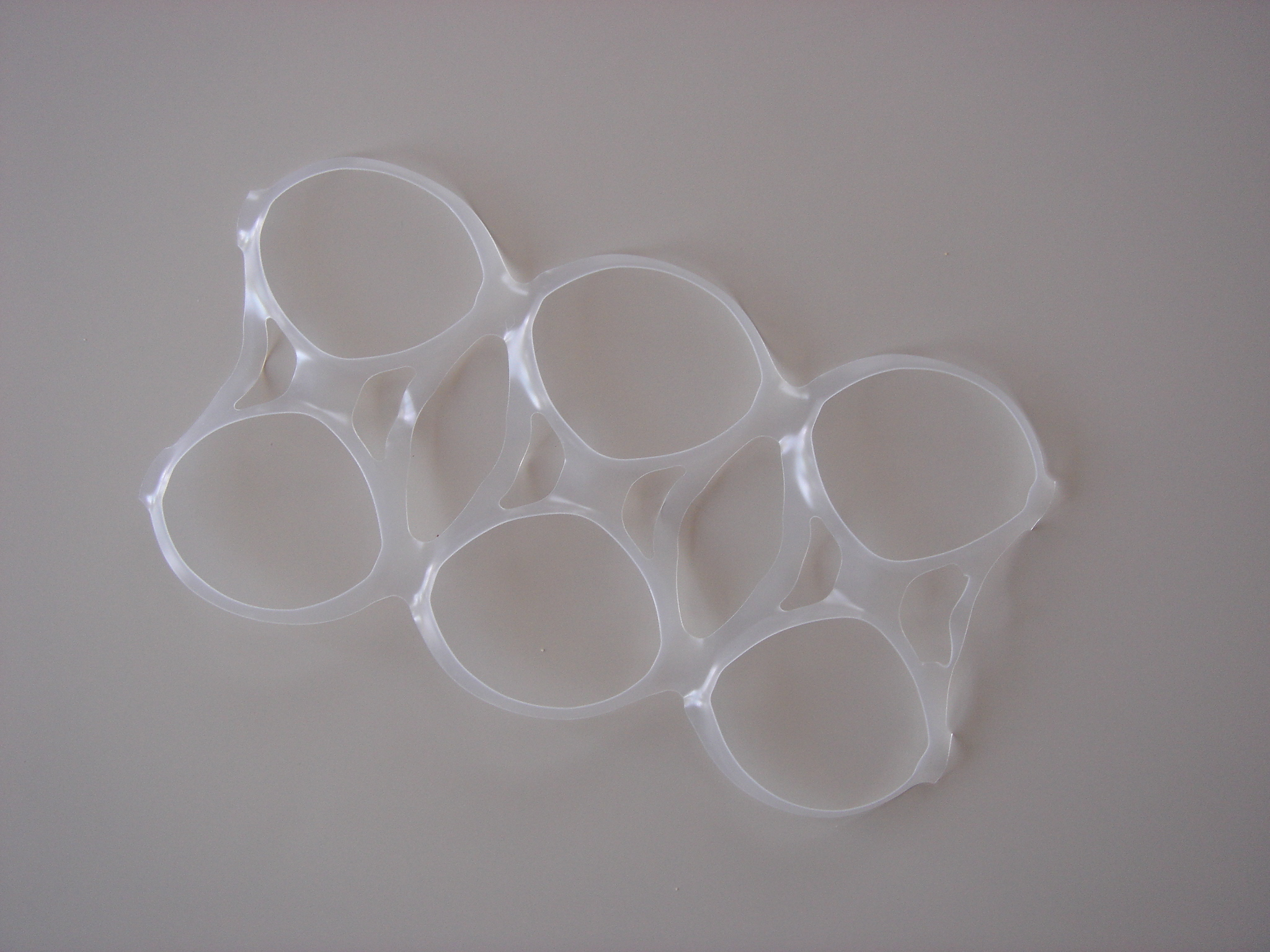
Six-pack rings

Six-pack rings or six-pack yokes are a set of connected plastic rings that are used in multi-packs of beverage, particularly six-packs of beverage cans. The rings have gained notoriety because of concerns for marine debris entangling wildlife.

== History ==
Invented in the 1960s, within 10 years, plastic rings had completely replaced the paper and metal-based holders then common in the market. Today several manufacturers continue to produce six-pack rings. Though interest in multi-packs has continued to grow, other variations, including paperboard baskets and LDPE plastic can carriers, have grown in popularity, providing an alternative to conventional six-pack rings.

== Environmental concerns ==
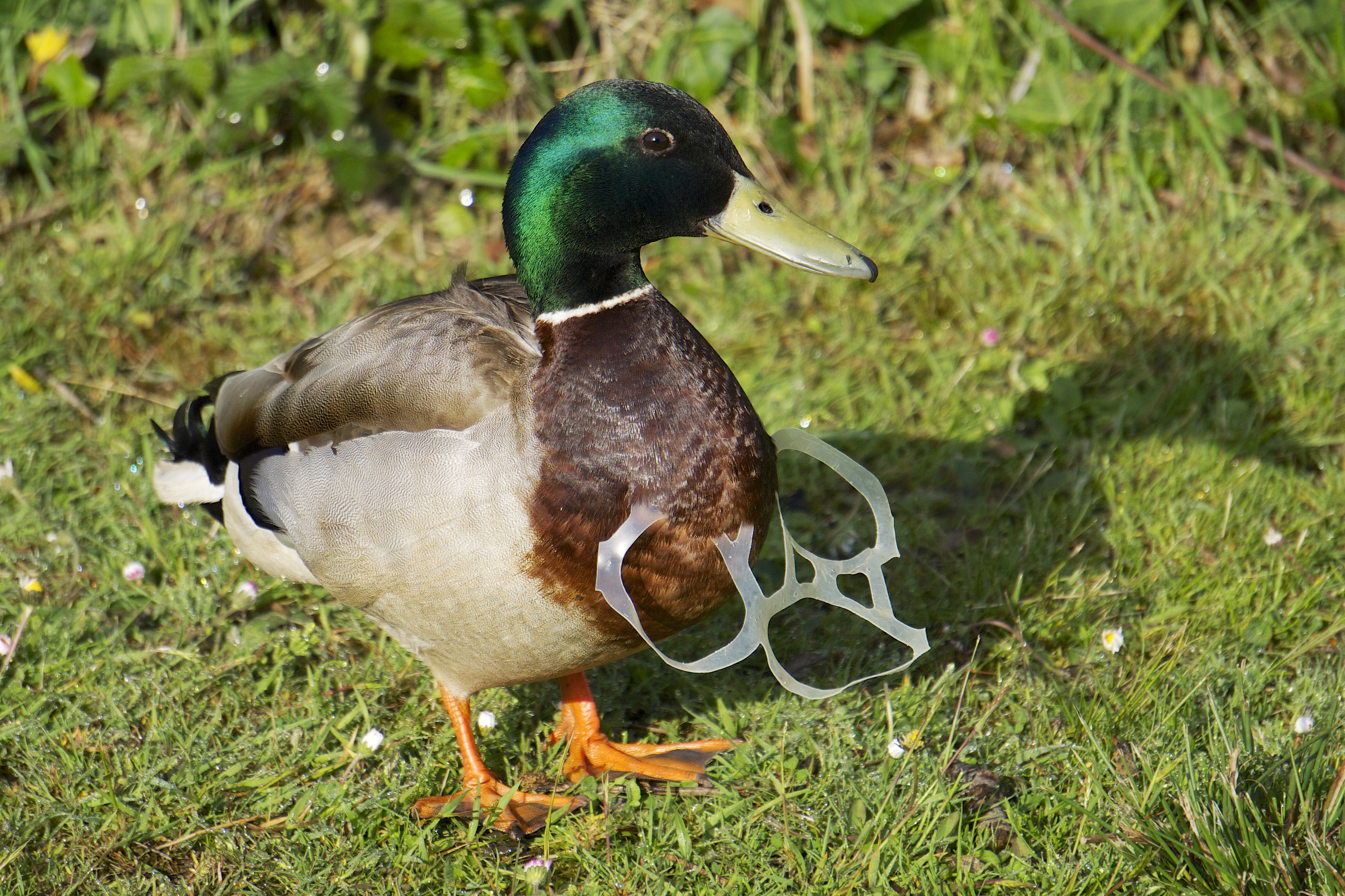
A male mallard – the duck's neck has grown through a packing ring

Since the late 1970s, six-pack rings were recognized as a form of marine litter. It is recommended that each loop be cut so that no entanglement can occur. In a cleanup of an Oregon beach in 1988, 1,500 six-pack rings were picked up by volunteers in a few hours. Like other plastic products, the production of the plastic rings uses fossil fuels. Compared to fishing gear, cigarette butts and other plastic wastes, six-pack rings are a smaller contributor to marine litter.

The first law banning non-degradable ring carriers was in the US state of Vermont in 1977, and by 1991 27 states had followed suit. A biodegradability performance standard was recommended by the Environmental Protection Agency in 1993, following the findings that non-degradable ring carriers had been found in great quantities in the marine environment where they persisted for decades and threatened marine life. In 1994 The US Federal Regulation proposed that all plastic ring carriers be naturally degradable materials, applying to all importers and processors. Many manufacturers do this by using photodegradable material, which can take months to break down. However, the fragments and microplastics resulting from the decomposition process can still be eaten by animals.

In 2010, Saltwater Brewery developed eco-friendly rings that are biodegradable and compostable. In 2018 Carlsberg Breweries announced the use of a new type of glue, which took three years to make, that would hold their beers together instead of plastic rings. In 2023, PepsiCo announced plans to replace their plastic rings with recyclable, paper-based carriers.
