= Multi-pack =

Packaging that combines or holds multiple items or smaller packages

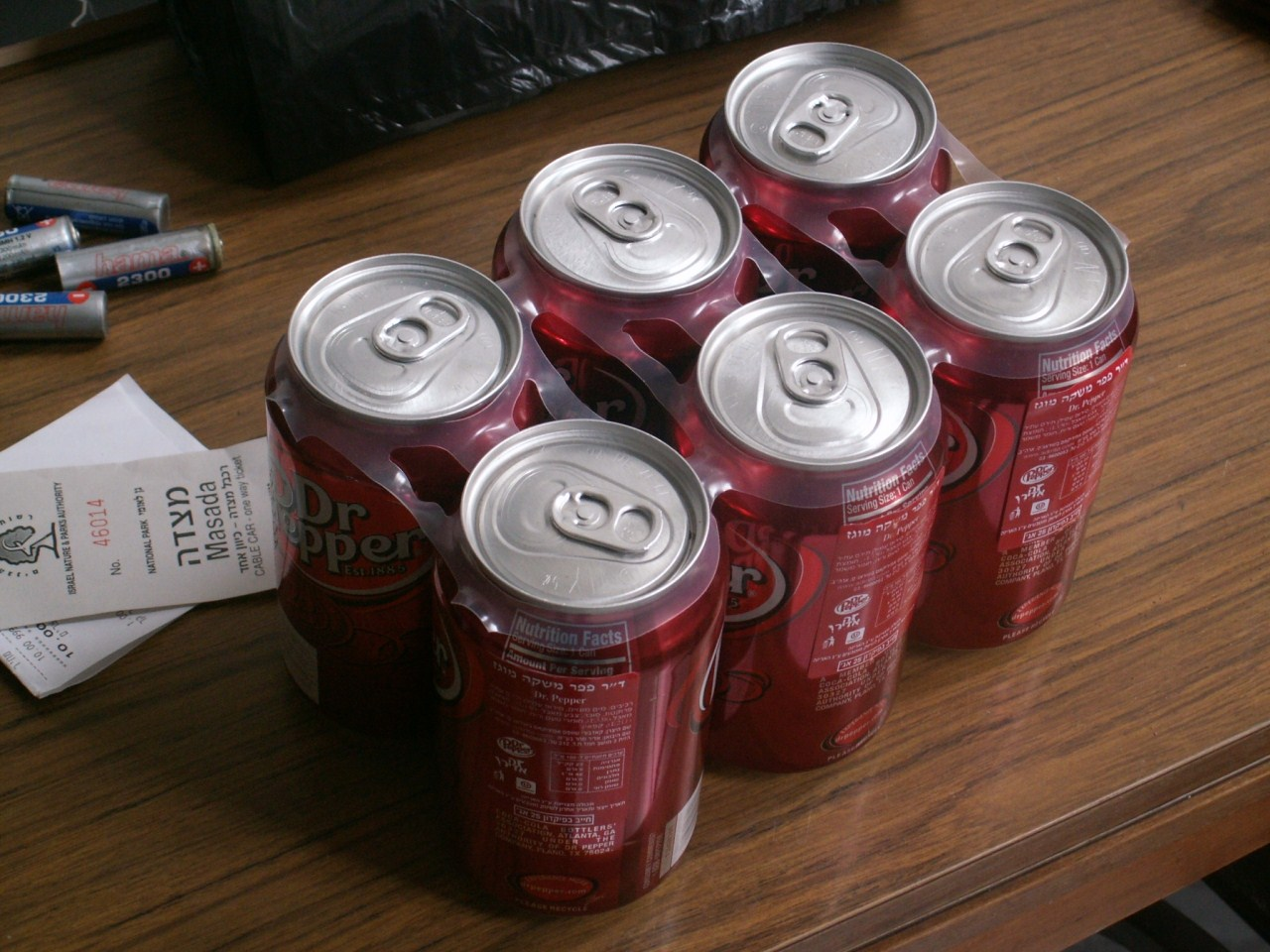
Six-pack rings for beverage cans

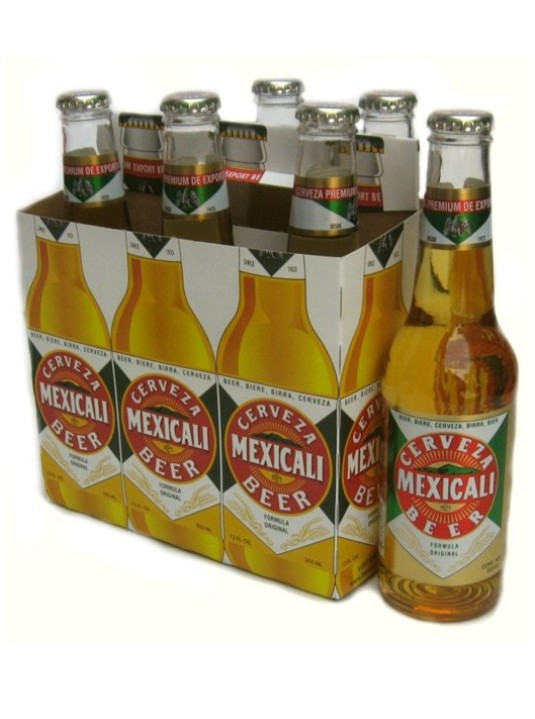
Paperboard basket

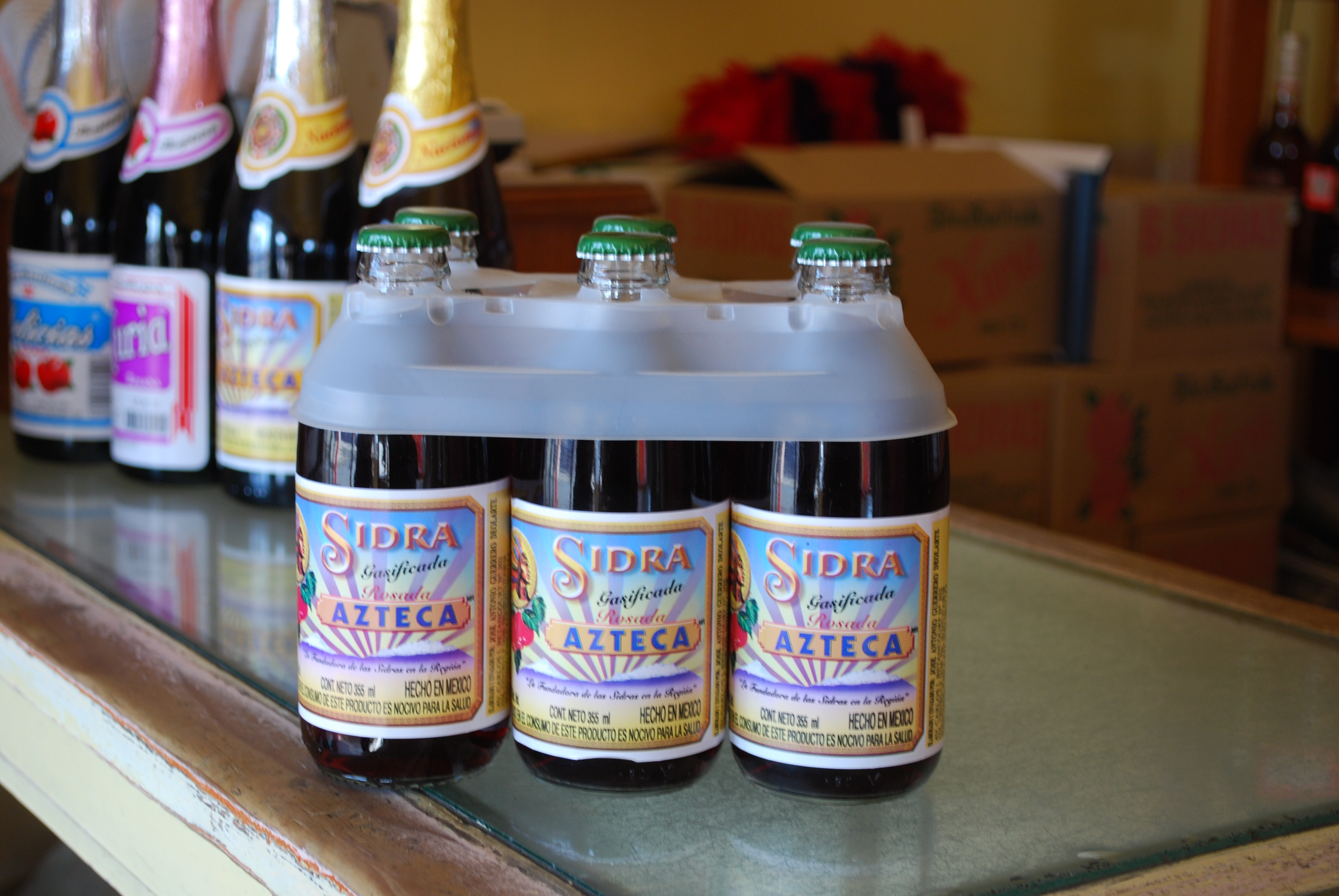
Plastic six-pack carrier

A multi-pack also known as multipack is packaging that combines or holds multiple items or smaller packages.

== Functions ==
Multi-packs can be used to:

- Combine several items for a larger unit of sale, often with a reduced individual cost
- Provide a package handle to conveniently carry several items
- Help prevent package pilferage
- Provide a tamper indicating seal
- Reduce environmental impact of secondary packaging
- Keep items clean
- Obscure the bar codes on the individual combined items and provide a new one for the multi-pack

== Methods ==
A wide variety of materials and procedures are available to combine items or packages into a multi-pack. This can include shrink film, pressure sensitive tape, paper overwrap, adhesives, paperboard carriers, plastic clips, etc.

== Beverages ==
Beverage cans and bottles are sold in multi-packs such as six-packs, twelve-packs, and cases of 24. These can be paperboard baskets, paperboard overwraps and cartons, corrugated fiberboard boxes, HDPE plastic handles, six-pack rings, and shrink packs.

== Other uses ==
A wide variety of items and packages are combined into multi-packs for sale.

=== Gallery ===
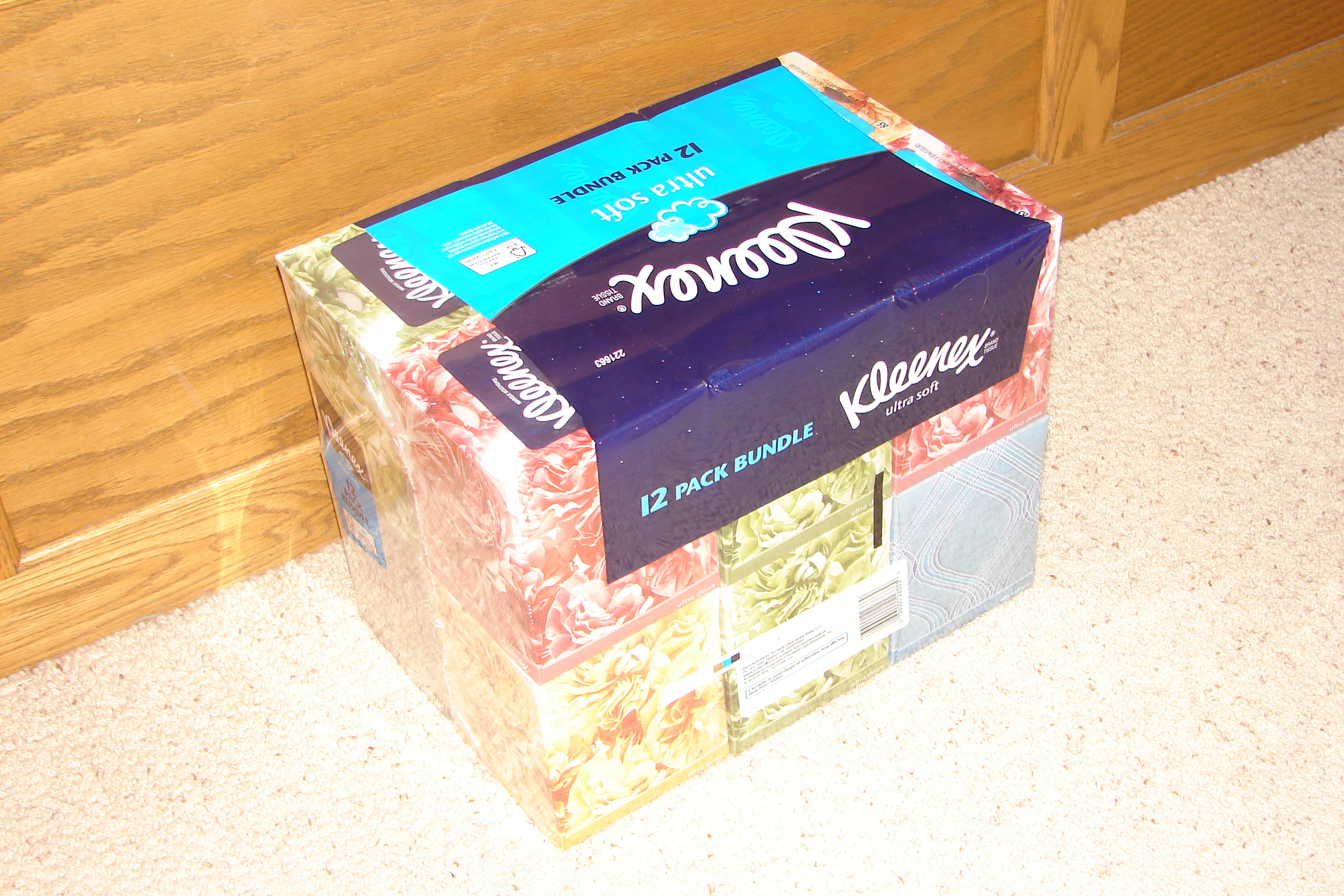
Shrink wrap used to form a 12-pack of cartons of tissue

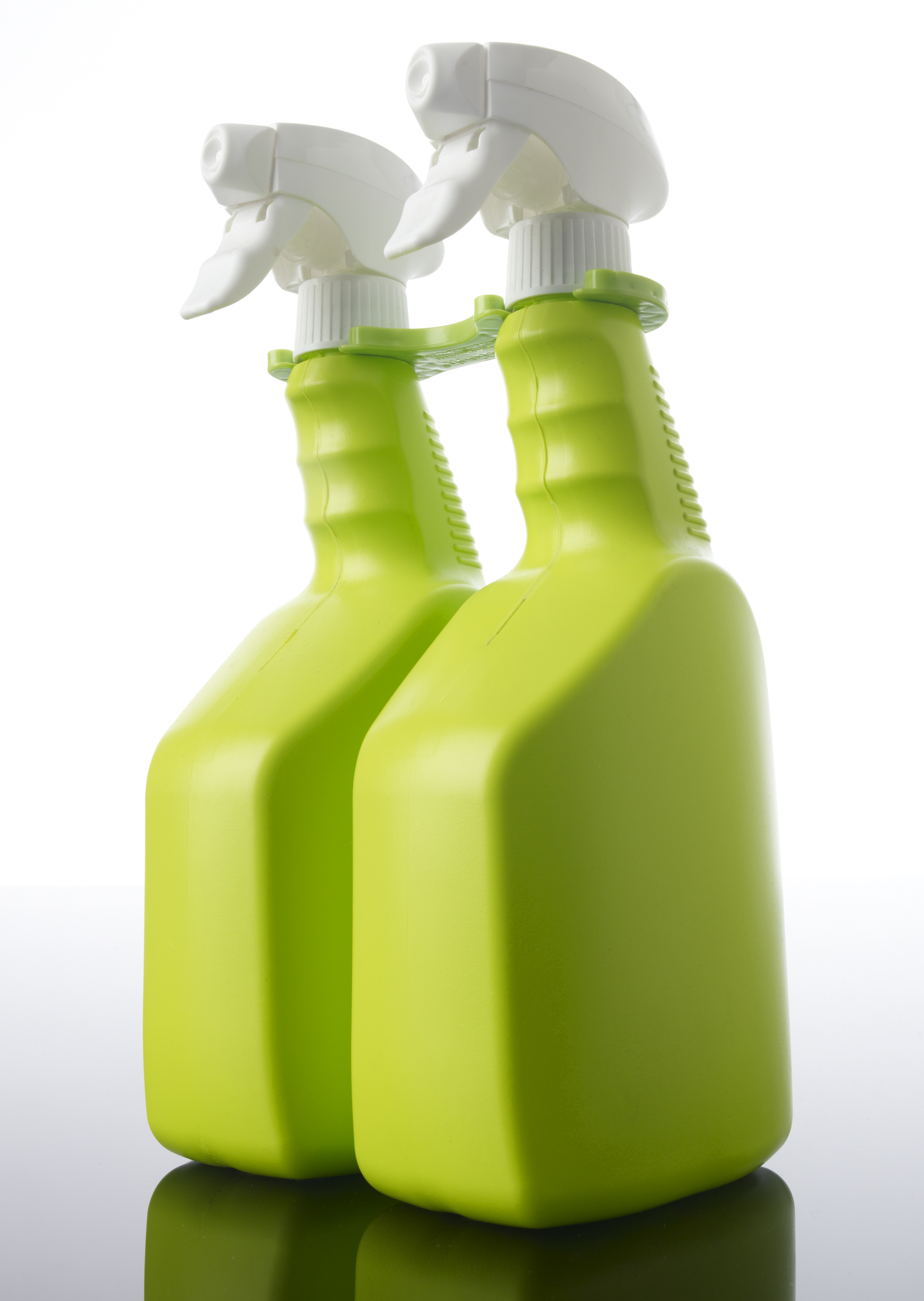
Clip used to join two spray bottles and provide a handle

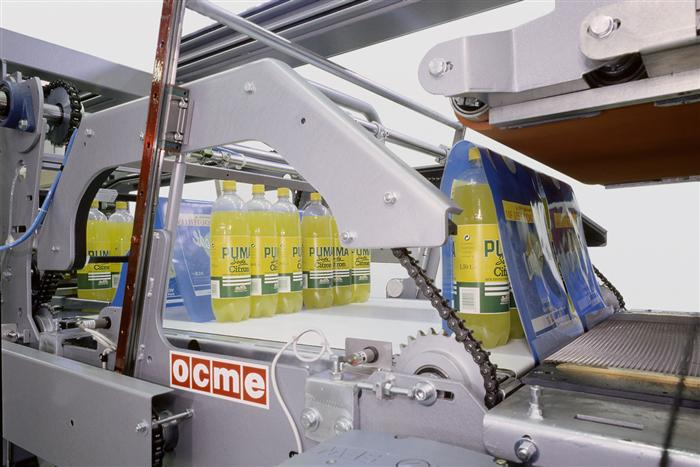
Shrink film wrap being applied to beverage bottles

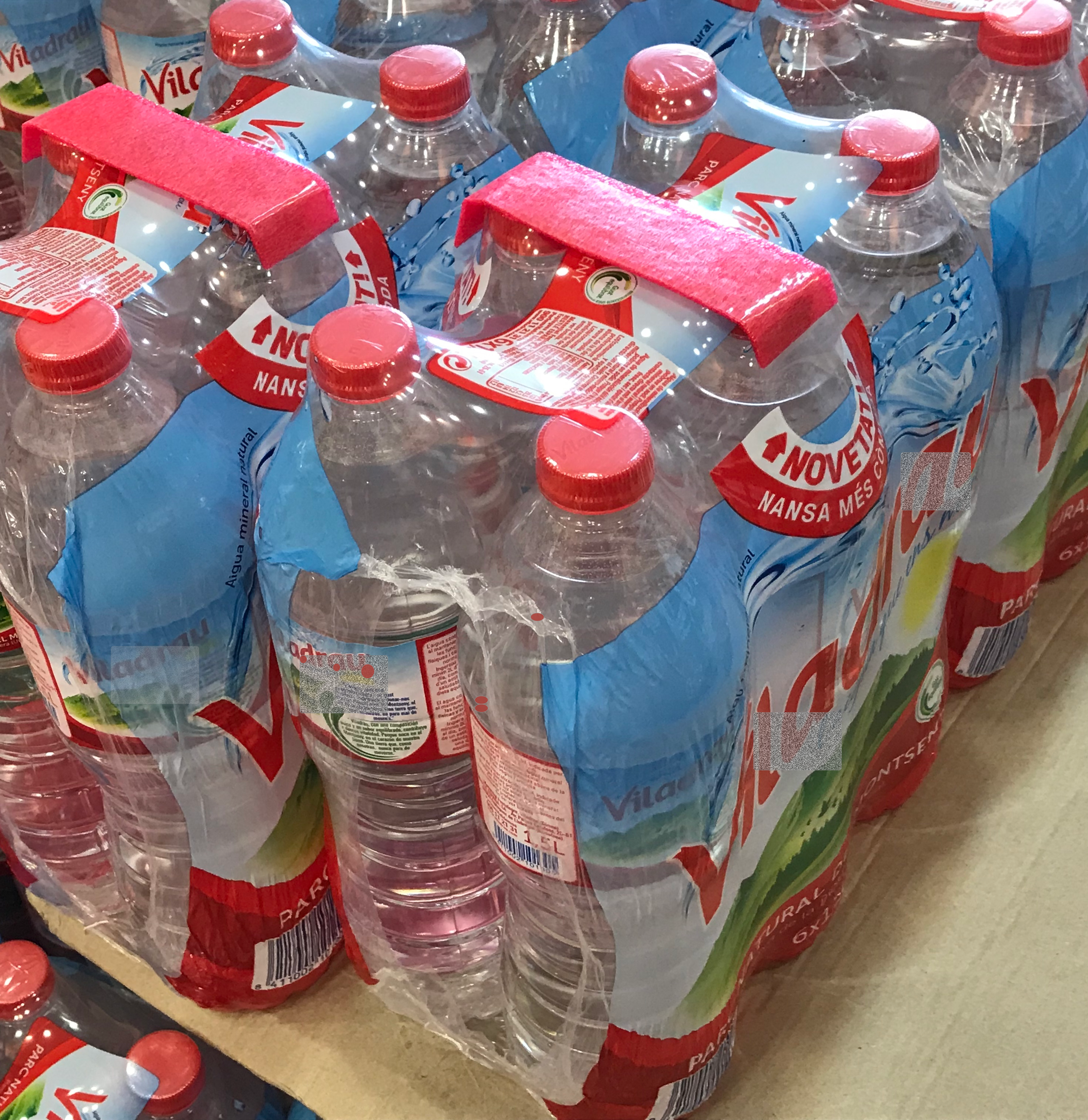
Six water bottles in shrink wrap with tape handle.

== See also ==
- Shrink wrap
- Plastic wrap
- Plastic bag
