= Shrink wrap =

Polymer used to bundle boxes on a pallet for transport

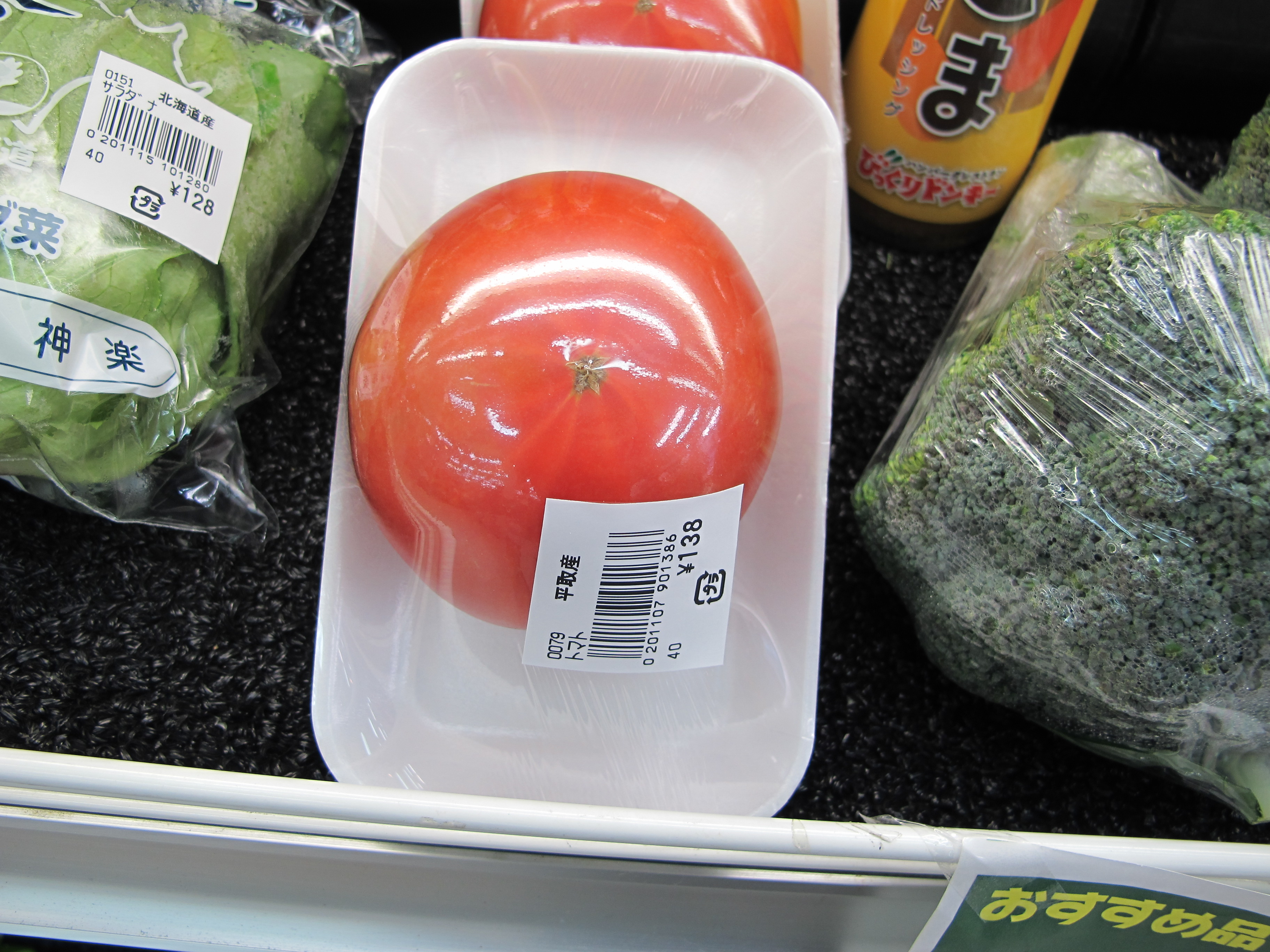
Grocery vegetables wrapped with a plastic shrink film.

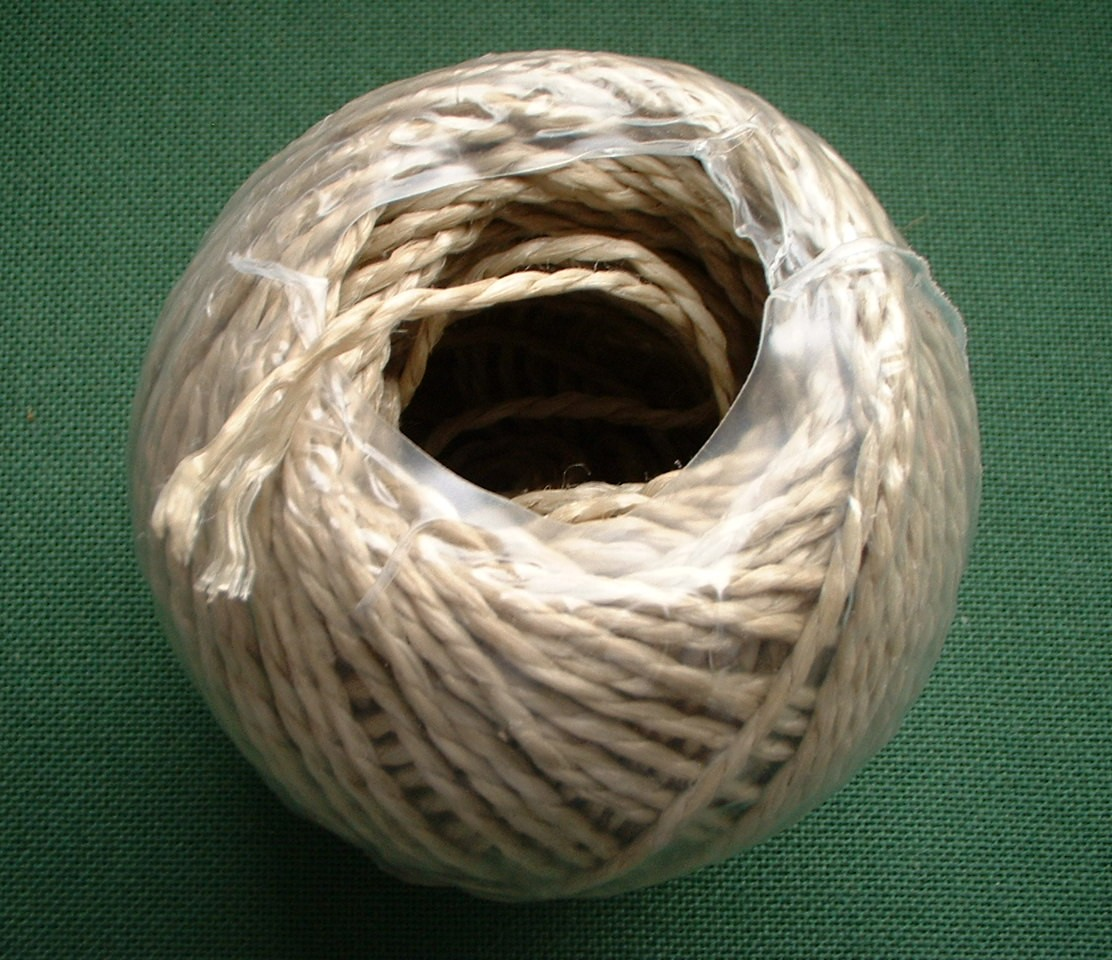
Shrink wrapped ball of twine

Shrink wrap, also shrink film, is a material made up of polymer plastic film. When heat is applied, it shrinks tightly over whatever it is covering. Heat can be applied with a handheld heat gun (electric or gas), or the product and film can pass through a heat tunnel on a conveyor.

== Composition ==
The most commonly used shrink wrap is polyolefin, including Polyethylene, Polypropylene. It is available in a variety of thicknesses, clarities, strengths and shrink ratios. The two primary films can be either crosslinked, or non crosslinked.

Coextrusions and laminations are available for specific mechanical and barrier properties for shrink wrapping food. For example, five layers might be configuration as EP/EVA/copolyester/EVA/EP, where EP is ethylene-propylene and EVA is ethylene-vinyl acetate copolymer.

PVC is the most used shrink wrap, because it is light and inexpensive. PVC has been banned in many countries because it decomposes into harmful products. Detriments of PVC are that is not good for bundling, leaves carbon deposits, and has a low shrink force.

Polyolefin or POF shrink wrap is a premium shrink wrap, as it is extremely durable and versatile. POF is puncture resistant, and has a strong seal strength, which allows it to be used for irregularly shaped items. POF is available in 35, 45, 60, 75, and 100, 1 mil gauges. POF shrink wrap is made from 100% recyclable materials, and is FDA approved. It has great clarity, and a glossy self-appearance, as appearance is critical. POF is great for bundling multiple items together, and has the ability to shrink completely and quickly.

PE, a polyolefin, is used in several forms of flexible protective packaging. There are 3 different forms PE can take place in. These include Low-Density Polyethylene (LDPE), Linear Low-Density Polyethylene (LLDPE), and High-Density Polyethylene (HDPE). For shrink wrapping LDPE would be the best choice, as it has a higher strength, and more durability for heavier items. These wraps can also have graphic images printed on them, and LDPE provides the greatest quality. PE gauges can go all the way up to 1200, allowing for a great range of gauges. The disadvantage for PE is that it does not have a great shrink rate, and has lower clarity than other wraps.

== Manufacture ==
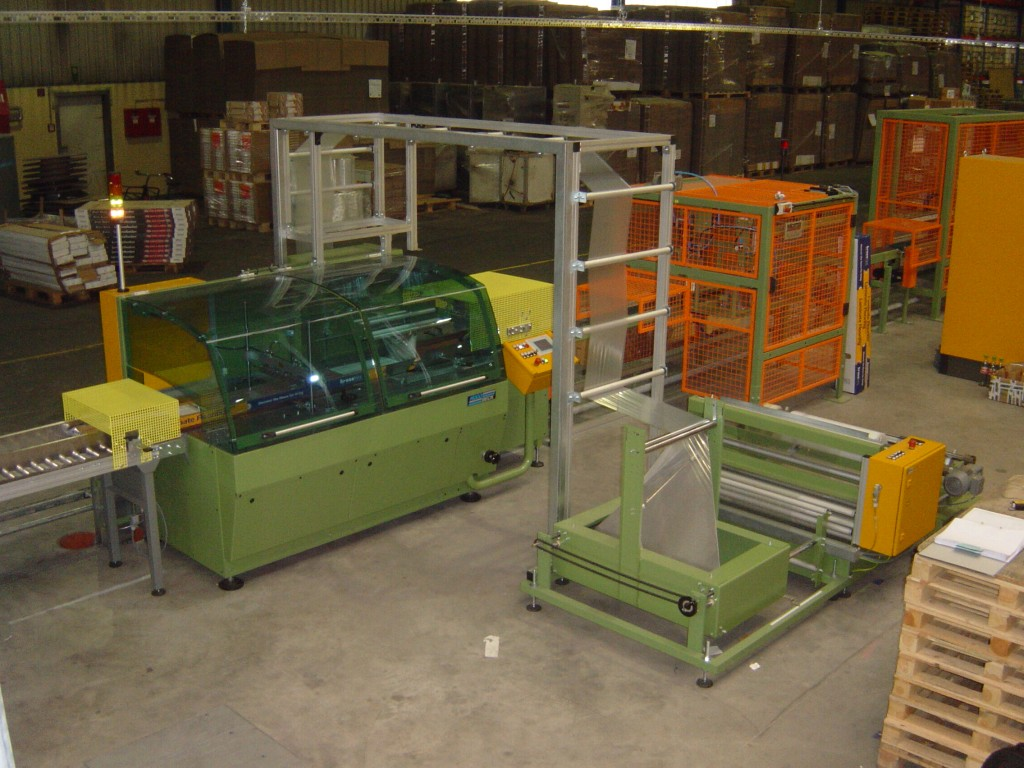
A machine designed to continuously wrap up to 35 packets per minute

A shrink film can be made to shrink in one direction (unidirectional or mono-directional) or in both directions (bidirectional).

Films are stretched when they are warm to orient the molecules from their initial random pattern. Cooling the film sets the film's characteristics until it is reheated: this causes it to shrink back toward its initial dimensions.

Prior to orientation, the molecules of a sheet or tube are randomly intertwined like a bowl of spaghetti. The molecules are coiled and twisted and have no particular alignment. However, when a draw force is imposed, the amorphous regions of the chains are straightened and aligned to the direction of orientation. By applying proper cooling, the molecules will be frozen in this state until sufficient heat energy is applied to allow the chains to shrink back. One can visualize this phenomenon by stretching a rubber band and dipping it into liquid nitrogen so as to freeze in the stretched state. The band will remain in this state as long as it is kept at sufficiently cold temperatures. However, when enough heat energy is applied, the rubber band will shrink back to its original relaxed state.

Orientation on a commercial scale can be achieved using either of two processes: a tenterframe or a bubble process. Tenterframe technology is used to produce a variety of "heat-set" products, with biaxially oriented polypropylene (BOPP) being the most common (heat-setting is a process whereby a film is reheated in a constrained state such that the shrink properties are destroyed).

The second commercial process is the bubble process, sometimes referred to as the tubular process. In this process, a primary tube is produced by either blowing or casting the tube onto an external or internal mandrel, respectively. It is common to use water to help cool the primary tube at this point. After the primary tube has been cooled, it is then reheated and inflated into a second bubble using air much like a balloon is blown. Upon inflation, the tube is oriented in both directions simultaneously.

The family of shrink films has broadened over the years with many multi-layer constructions being sold today. Shrink film attributes include shrink, sealability, optics, toughness, and slip. With regard to shrink properties, there are onset temperature, free shrink, shrink force, shrink temperature range, memory, and overall package appearance.

== Use ==
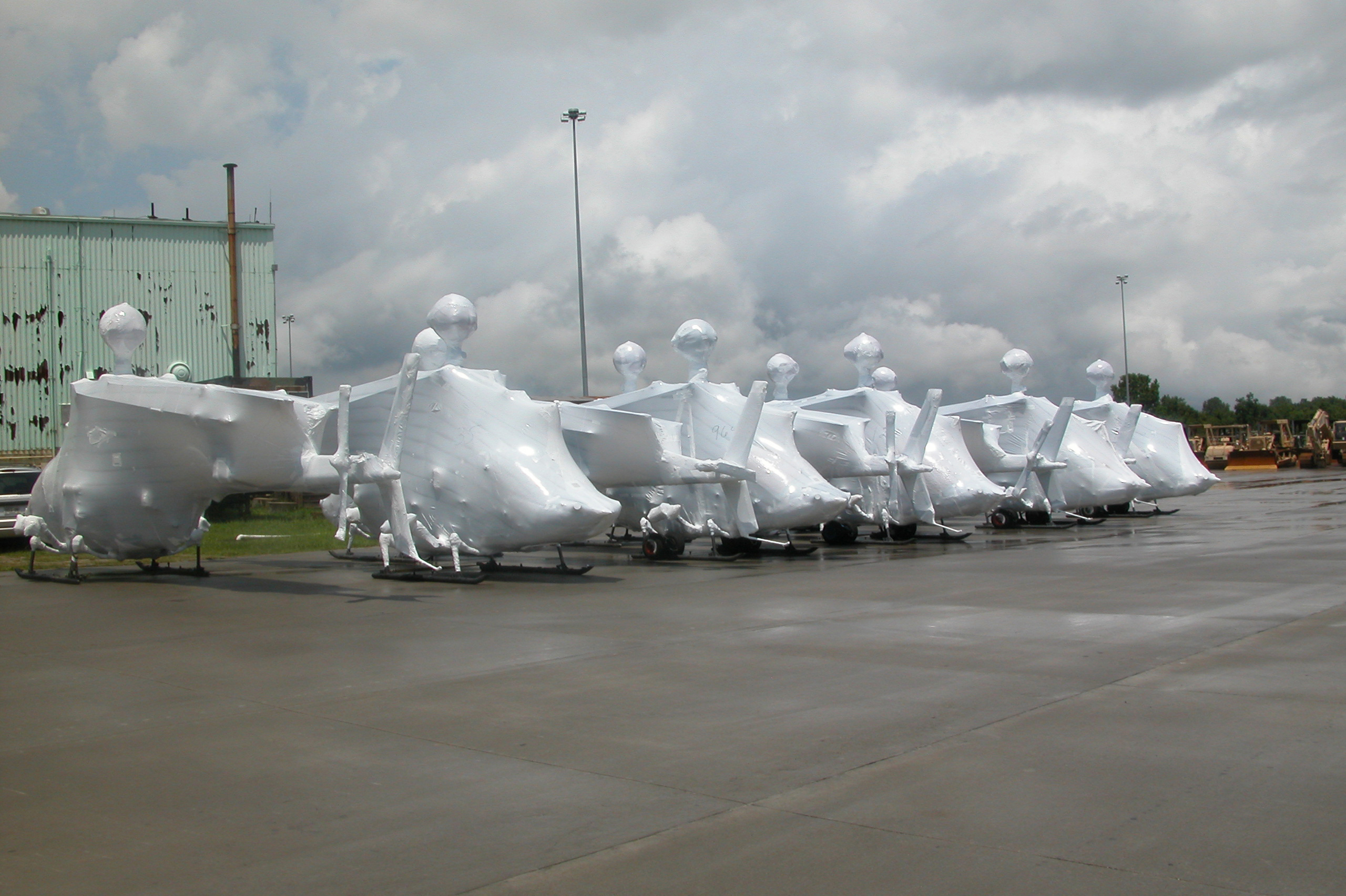
Shrink wrapped helicopters for transport

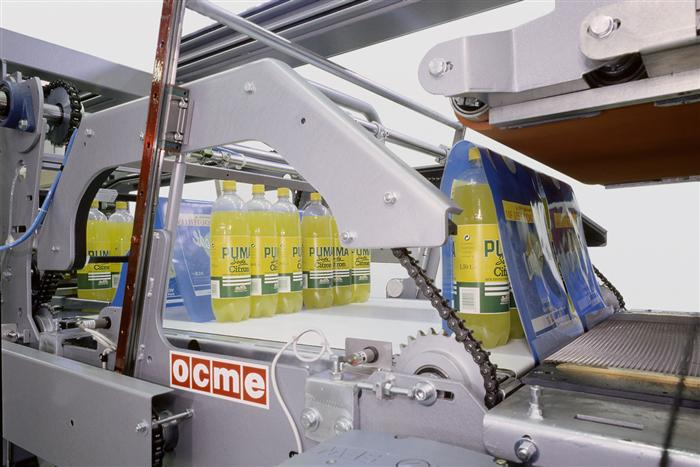
Shrink film wrap being applied on a soft drink packing line

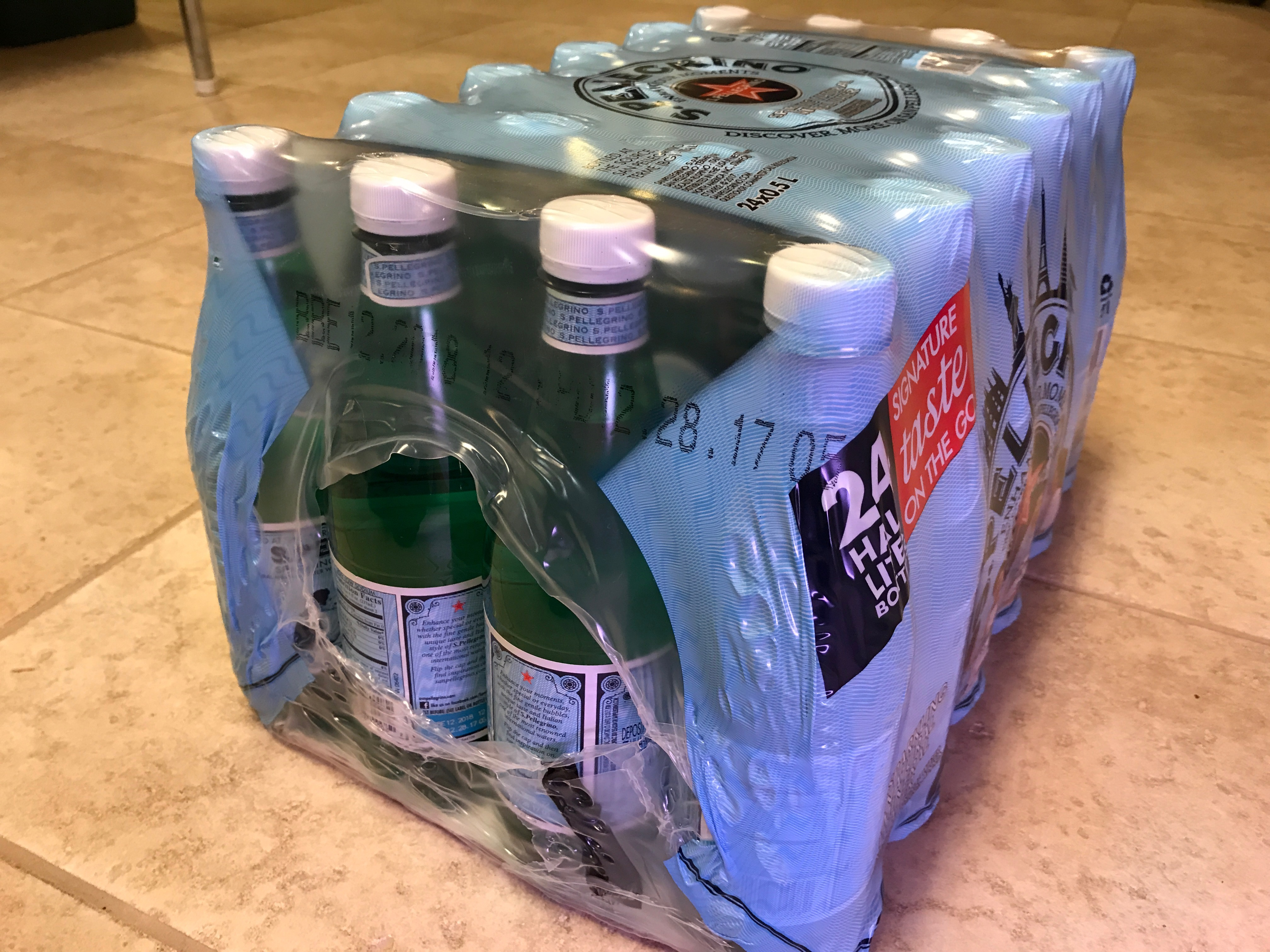
Shrink wrapped pack of bottles with ends (bulls eyes) as handles

Shrink wrap is applied over or around the intended item, often by automated equipment. It is then heated by a heat gun or sent through a shrink tunnel or oven for shrinking.

Shrink wrap can be supplied in several forms. Flat rollstock can be wrapped around a product, often with heat sealing to tack the film together. Centerfolded film is supplied on a roll with the plastic pre-folded in half, product is placed in the center portion, the remaining three edges are sealed to form a bag, and the package then heated which causes the bag to shrink and conform to the product. Pre-formed plastic shrink bags have one end open, the product is placed in the bag, sealed, and sent for heat shrinking.

Shrink wrap can be used to wrap buildings. It can wrap roofs after hurricanes, earthquakes, tornadoes and other disasters. Shrink wrap can be used for environmental containments to facilitate safe removal of asbestos, lead and other hazards.

Shrink wrap is sometimes used to wrap up books, especially adult-oriented ones and premium comics and manga, mainly to preserve their mint condition, as casual previewing prior to purchase wears or damages stock, rendering it unsaleable.

Vegetables such as cucumbers can be individually shrink wrapped to extend the shelf life.

Software on carriers such as CDs or DVDs are often sold in boxes that are packaged in shrink wrap. The licenses of such software are typically put inside the boxes, making it impossible to read them before purchasing. This has raised questions about the validity of such shrink wrap licenses.

Shrink wrap is commonly used as an overwrap on many types of packaging, including cartons, boxes, beverage cans and pallet loads. Foam cushioning can be held securely in shrink film, eliminating use of a traditional corrugated box. A variety of products may be enclosed in shrink wrap to stabilize the products, unitize them, keep them clean, or add tamper resistance. It can be the primary covering for some foods such as cheese, meats, vegetables and plants. Heat-shrink tubing is used to seal electric wiring.

Shrink bands are applied over parts of packages for tamper resistance or labels. It can be used as a Tamper-evident band.

It can also combine two packages or parts into a Multi-pack.

Shrink wrap is also commonly used within more industrial applications using a heavier weight shrink film. The principles remain the same with a heat shrinking process using a hand held heat gun. The following shrink wrap applications are becoming more widely used and accepted:

- Industrial shrink wrap containment of large plant equipment/components,
- Scaffold wrap containment of buildings/bridges,
- Building temporary shrink wrap structures for storage or other business operational uses,
- Marine shrink wrapping of boats and other vehicles,
- Shrink wrapping of palletized freight
- Disaster contingency and relief projects such as damaged buildings/roofs.

== See also ==
- Multi-pack
- Overwrap
- Overpackaging
- PLA film
- Plastic wrap
- Shrink wrap contract
- Stretch wrap
- Window insulation film
- Bubble wrap
