= Shrink tunnel =

Machine to shrink labels on products

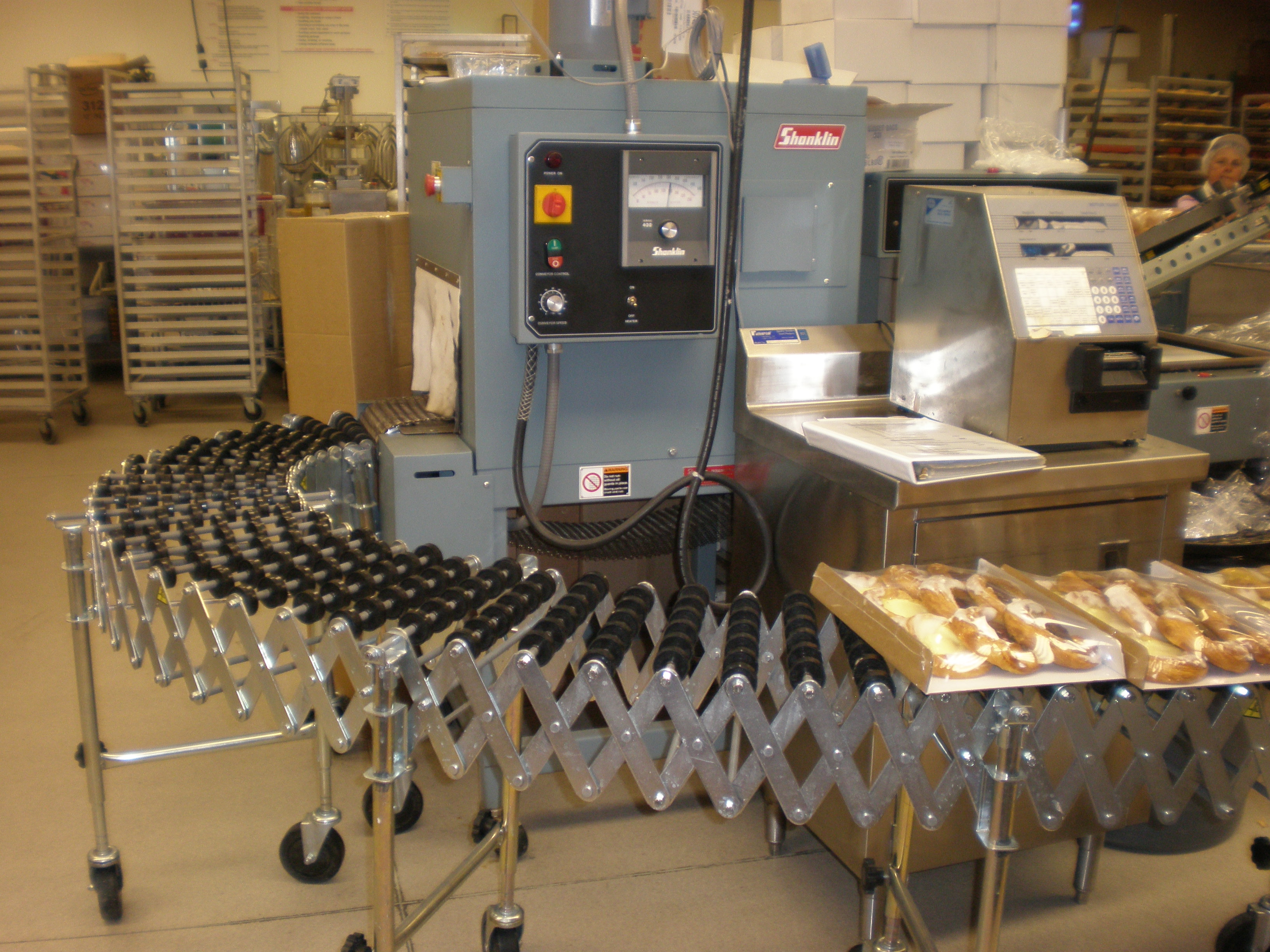
Heat tunnel for shrink wrapping bakery goods

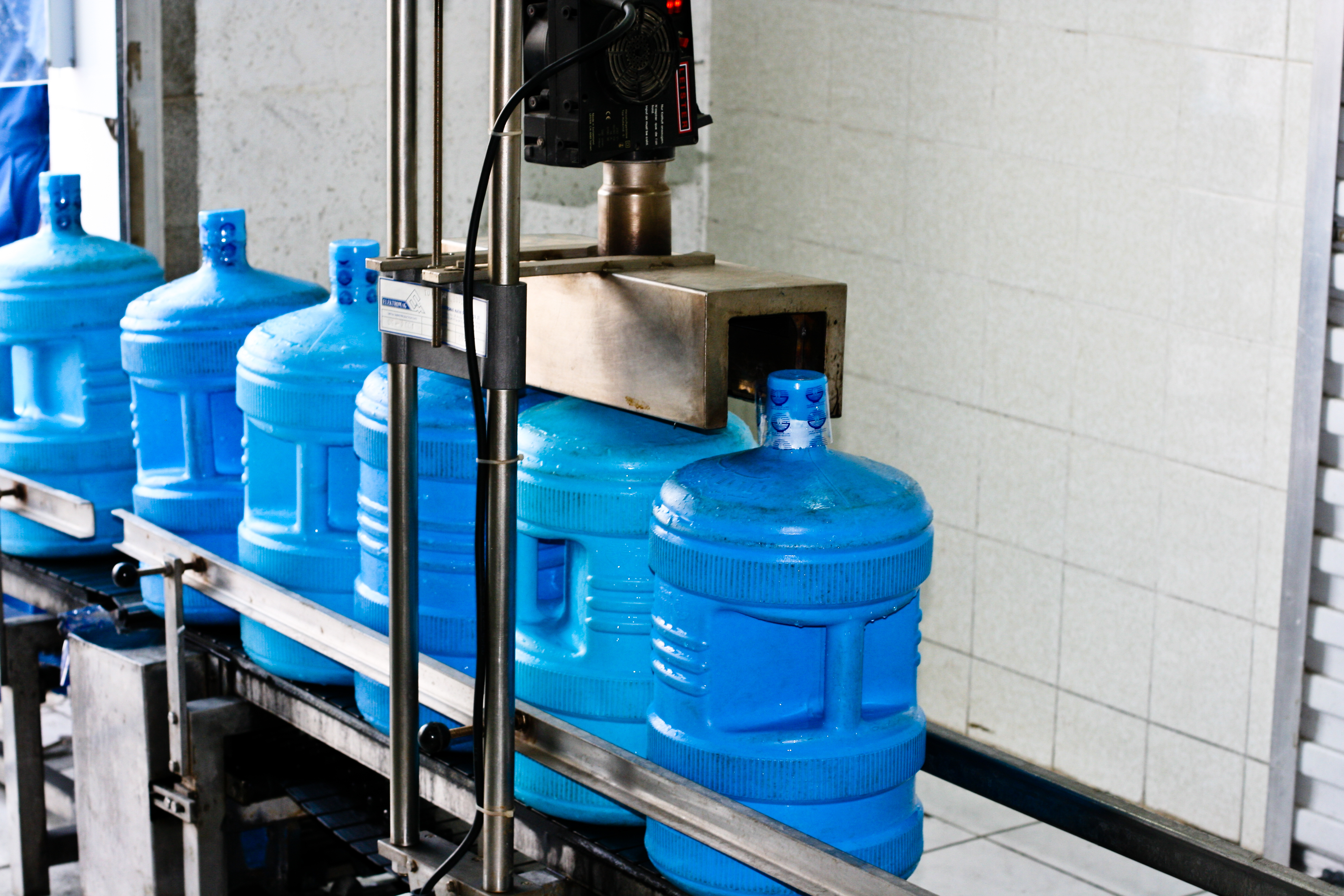
in-line heating of shrink bands on plastic bottles of water

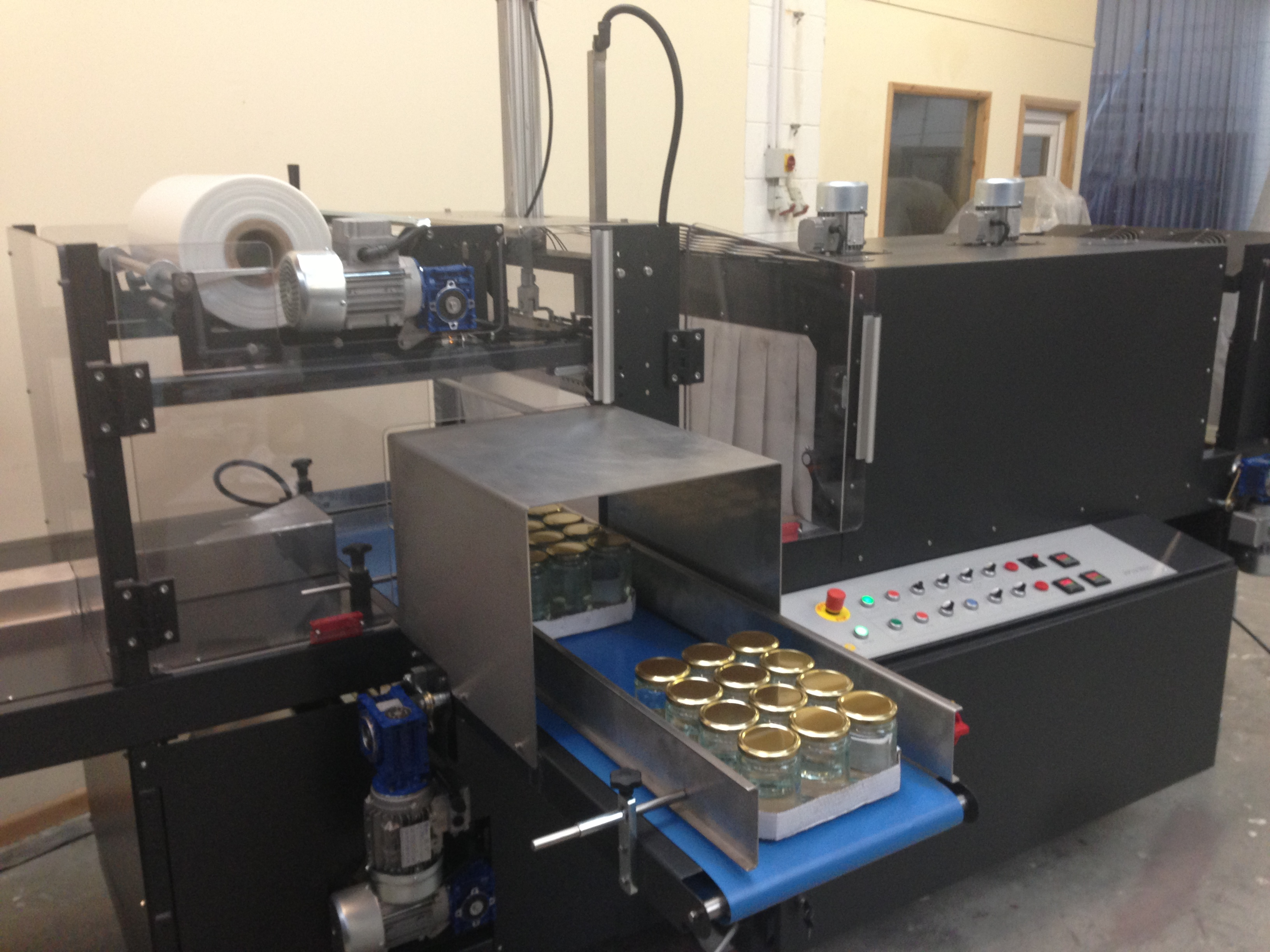
Machinery to apply and shrink an overwrap

A shrink tunnel or heat tunnel (also known as a shrink oven) is a heated tunnel mounted over or around a conveyor system. Items (such as packaging) have shrink film loosely applied; with heat, the film shrinks to fit snugly around the wrapped object.

== Uses ==
- Shrink labels.
- Combining small items for sale and display (example: bottled water).
- Tamper resistant or Tamper-evident bands or seals.
- Form large unit loads for transport.
- Form primary barrier on foods such as cheese, meats and fish.
- Skin packs.

== Types ==
Several types of shrink tunnels are available. The heat source can be based on heating element (electrical resistance), infrared heater, steam, or gas flame. Often forced air is used to improve convection, sometimes focusing the heat on one component of the item.

Tunnels are available with or without a conveyor system. Some are built into a production line or are integral with machinery that also applies the shrink film. Others are movable by hand or by castors. A shrink tunnel, referred to as an oven, may be equipped with an integrated conveyor of two different kinds: the roller conveyor or the belt conveyor. Roller conveyors can be used with polyolefin, PVC, and shrink polyethylene films. The space in between the rollers is filled with hot air from the bottom of the tunnel to shrink the film layer around the object, creating a sealed package. When used with polyolefin and PVC based films the rollers are called "live" or spinning. When used with polyethylene films the rollers are called "dead" or not spinning. The tunnels with Teflon mesh belts and polymer mesh belts are used for smaller packages, or when the package may have an instability and need a stable platform.

Some heat shrink tunnels have two or more zones for heating and controlled cooling.

== See also ==
- Heat gun
