= Heat gun =

Power tool used to emit hot air

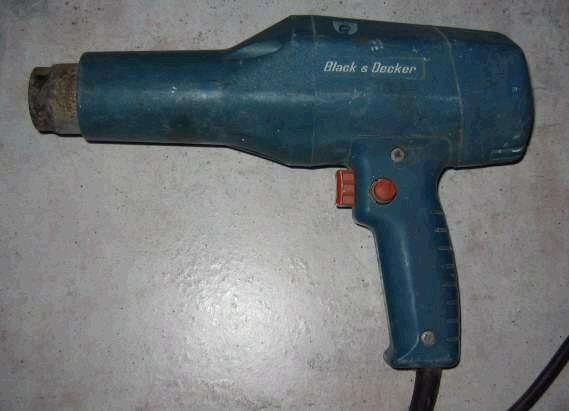
Example of hand held electric heat gun

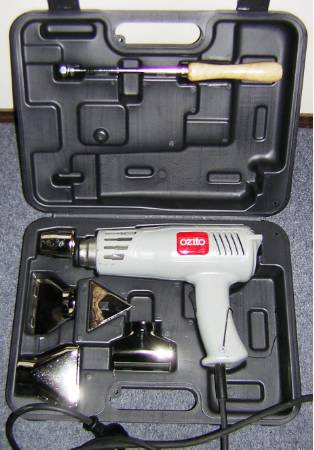
Commercial heat gun kit

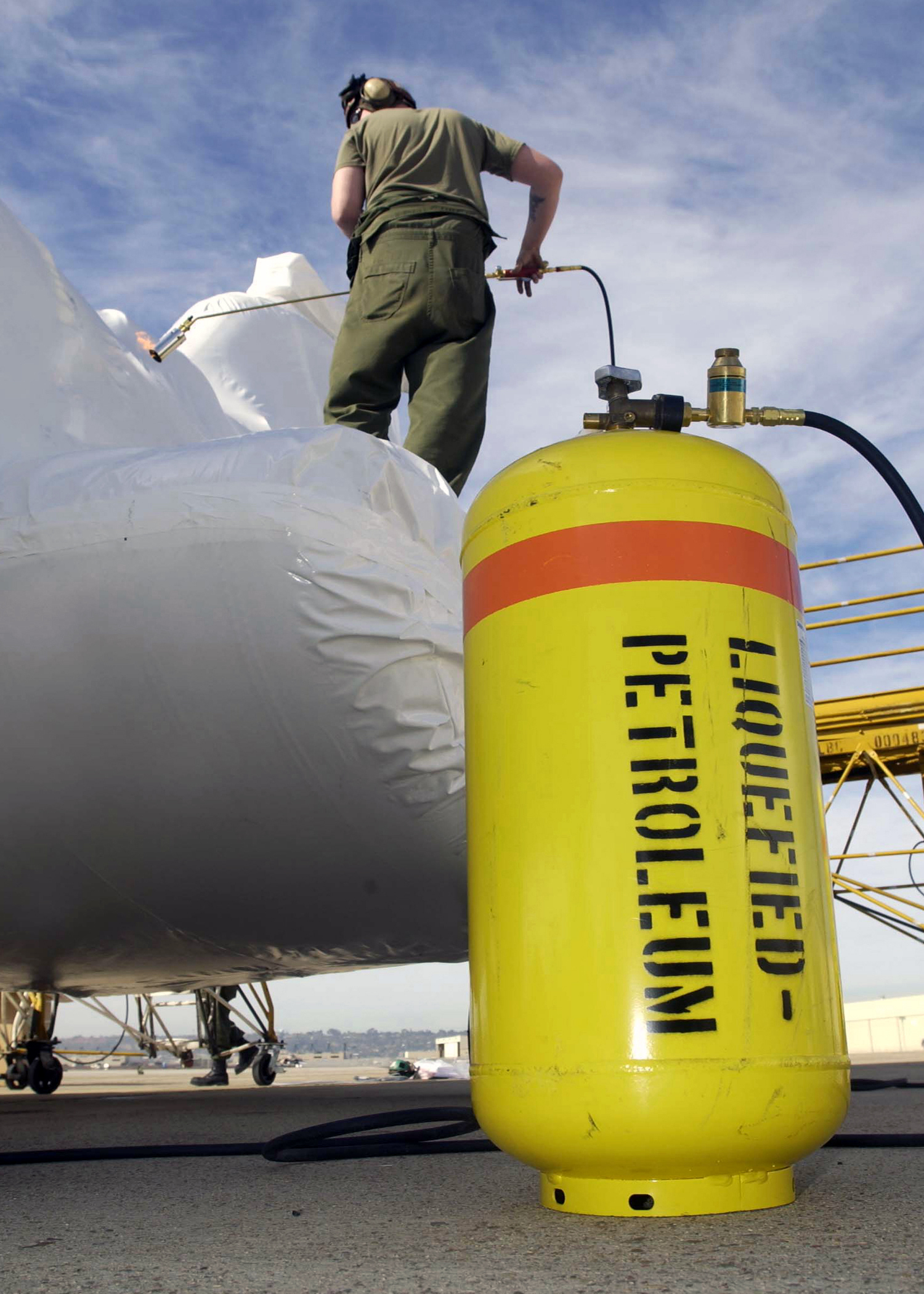
Flame heat gun for shrinkwrapping helicopter

A heat gun is a device used to emit a stream of hot air, usually at temperatures between 100 and 550 °C (373 and 823 K; 212 and 1,022 °F), with some hotter models running around 760 °C (1,030 K; 1,400 °F), which can be held by hand. Heat guns usually have the form of an elongated body pointing at what is to be heated, with a handle fixed to it at right angles and a pistol grip trigger in the same pistol form factor as many other power tools.

Though it shares similarities to a hair dryer, it is not meant as a substitute for the latter, which safely spreads the heat out across its nozzle to prevent scalp burning and has a limited temperature range, while heat guns have a concentrated element and nozzle, along with higher temperatures, which can easily scald the scalp or catch the hair on fire.

== Construction ==
A heat gun comprises a source of heat, usually an electrically heated element or a propane/liquified petroleum gas, a mechanism to move the hot air such as an electric fan, unless gas pressure is sufficient; a nozzle to direct the air, which may be a simple tube pointing in one direction, or specially shaped for purposes such as concentrating the heat on a small area or thawing a pipe but not the wall behind; a housing to contain the components and keep the operator safe; a mechanism to switch it on and off and control the temperature such as a trigger; a handle; and a built-in or external stand if the gun is to be used hands-free. Gas-powered soldering irons sometimes have interchangeable hot air blower tips to produce a very narrow stream of hot air suitable for working with surface-mount devices and shrinking heat-shrink tubing.

Focused infrared heaters are also used for localised heating.

== Usage ==
Heat guns are used in physics, materials science, chemistry, engineering, and other laboratory and workshop settings. Different types of heat gun operating at different temperatures and with different airflow can be used to strip paint, shrink heat shrink tubing, shrink film, and shrink wrap packaging, dry out damp wood, bend and weld plastic, soften adhesives, and thaw frozen pipes.

Heat guns, often called hot air guns or hot air stations for this application, are used in electronics to desolder and rework surface-mounted circuit board components. Heat guns are also used for functional testing of overheat protection devices, in order to safely simulate an overheat condition.

Household use of heat guns is common. Heat guns and lighter weight hair dryers are sometimes used to remove paint splashes and wallpapers. Heat guns are also used to make plastics such as PVC piping pliable for the purposes of bending, to soften wax and adhesives such as that used in electronics, and to thaw out frozen copper pipes. There are also heat gun form factors friendly for food purposes such as melting hard candies, searing meats, or to start a charcoal fire or grill. Heat guns are sometimes used to upholster furniture and repair leather and vinyl goods.

For removing lead paint temperatures below 590 °C (863 K; 1,094 °F) are used to minimize vaporization.

== See also ==
- Hot stapler
- Thermoforming
- Shrink tunnel
