= Forming processes =

Type of manufacturing process

Forming processes are particular manufacturing processes which make use of suitable stresses (like compression, tension, shear or combined stresses) which cause plastic deformation of the materials to produce required shapes.

Since 2001, demand has increased for microforming components for miniaturized products.

== Types ==
Some examples of forming processes are:

- Forging
- Extrusion
- Rolling
- Sheet metal working
- Rotary swaging
- Thread rolling
- Explosive forming
- Electromagnetic forming
- Plastic extrusion
- Die forming
- Food extrusion

== See also ==
- Metalworking § Forming processes
- Forming (metalworking) § Forming processes
- Pedogenesis - soil forming processes
