= Micro-compounding =

Chemical process

Micro-compounding is the mixing or processing of polymer formulations in the melt on a small scale, typically milliliters. It is popular for research and development because it gives faster, more reliable results with smaller samples and less cost. Its applications include pharmaceutical, biomedical, and nutritional areas.

== Design ==
Micro-compounding is typically performed with a tabletop, twin screw micro-compounder, or micro-extruder with a working volume of 5 or 15 milliliters. With such small volumes, it is difficult to have sufficient mixing in a continuous extruder. Therefore, micro-compounders typically have a batch mode (recirculation) and a conical shape.

The L/D of a continuous twin screw extruder is mimicked in a batch micro-compounder by the recirculation mixing time, which is controlled by a manual valve. With this valve, the recirculation can be interrupted to unload the formulation in either a strand or an injection moulder, a film device or a fiber line. Typical recirculation times are one to three minutes, depending on the ease of dispersive and distributive mixing of the formulation.

== Benefits ==
Micro-compounding can now produce films, fibers, and test samples (rods, rings, tablets) from mixtures as small as 5 ml in less than ten minutes. The small footprint requires less lab space than for a parallel twin screw extruder. One micro-extruder, developed to test whether drug delivery enabled improved bioavailability of poorly soluble drugs or the sustained release of active ingredients show or require sensitive and water destroying invasives.
