= Printpack =

American packaging company

- Type: Private
- Industry: Packaging
- Founded: 1956
- Founder: J. Erskine Love
- Headquarters: Atlanta, Georgia, U.S.
- Key people: Jimmy Love, President, CEO, and Chairman of the Board
- Number of employees: 3,900
- Website: www.printpack.com

Printpack is an American flexible and rigid packaging company specializing in the food, beverage, pharmaceutical, and agricultural industries. Headquartered in Atlanta, Georgia, Printpack has multiple plants in the United States and Mexico. Printpack services many notable companies, including multiple Fortune 500 companies, and their products are shipped worldwide.

== History ==
=== Founding and early years ===
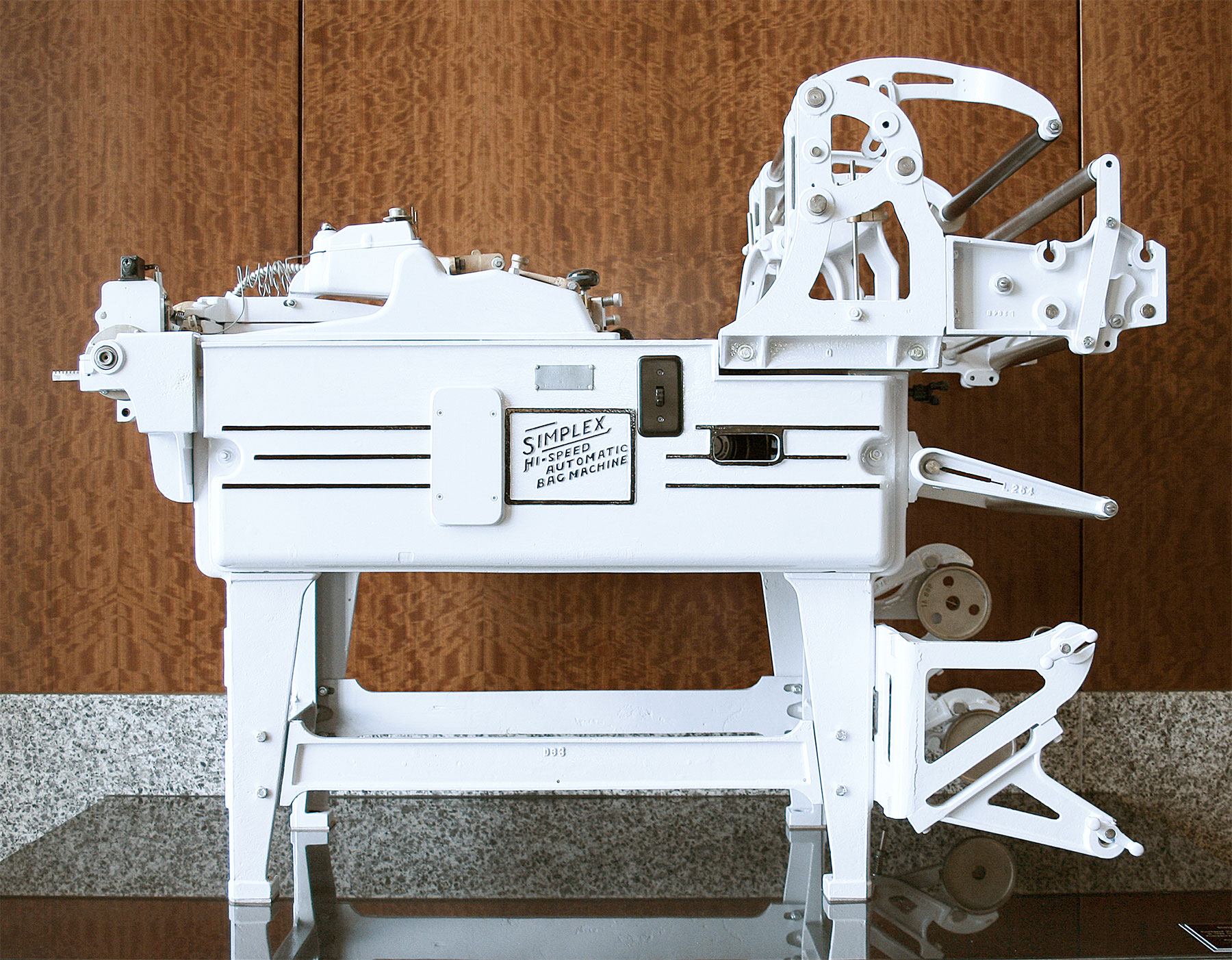
Printpack's first bag machine

Printpack Inc. was founded in Atlanta by J. Erskine Love Jr., an alumnus of the Georgia Institute of Technology, in 1956 as a printing company whose original product was cellophane bags. By 1960 Printpack had begun creating in-house graphic designs and branching out of the Southeast to making sales in the Midwest. In 1963 Printpack moved to a new 30,000 square-foot location which would remain the company's headquarters for decades. When the company celebrated its first decade Printpack was servicing over 50 clients including Frito-Lay.

=== Expansion and acquisition ===
In 1969, Printpack built their first manufacturing plant outside of Atlanta in Grand Prairie, Texas. Along, with the expansion Printpack also acquired multiple packaging companies such as Southeastern Packaging Inc. and Sigmadyne Corporation. In 1970 the company's three year old R&D department had a breakthrough creating extrusion coating (laminating) for potato chip bags.

In 1978, Printpack made another landmark in the flexible packaging industry when they became the first manufacturer of all-plastic labels for PET plastic bottles. At this time Printpack was the largest independent flexible packaging company in the U.S. and also the nation's largest cellophane converter. By 1985 Printpack was operating plants in Georgia, Texas, Virginia, Illinois, and California with revenues over $100 million.

=== Erskine Love's passing and succession ===
On February 21, 1987, J. Erskine Love died suddenly. The company was left without its founder and CEO however, Erskine's wife Gay Love quickly assumed the role of chairman of the Board while their son Dennis was named CEO. In May, 1993, Printpack which had recently expanded to Ireland, acquired Flexpack U.K. Ltd. and rebranded it as Printpack Europe Ltd. in Bury, England. A year later the company acquired another English packaging company, but it was later sold. By 1994, the company had reached revenues of over $500 million.

=== James River purchase ===
Printpack made its biggest acquisition in August 1996, when they acquired the flexible packaging department of the James River Corporation. For a deal valued around $365 million, Printpack gained four lamination plants, five film and converting plants, and a rigid plastic container plant. Along with all the plants and equipment, this acquisition also came with the accounts of Georgia-Pacific and Kraft Foods. The post-acquisition integration had issues including one strike and some consolidation, but in June 1998, Printpack posted revenues of $850 million and was stable again. In 2002, Printpack recorded revenue of $1.1 billion setting a new company record.

=== 2000–current day ===
Printpack has continued expanding both internally and via acquisitions. Since 2002, the company divested its European operations and now operates only in the United States and Mexico. In 2007, Printpack moved to a new corporate headquarters in Atlanta, Georgia. Printpack opened its first plant in Asia in 2009 when they opened a facility in Suzhou, China. In 2010, Printpack entered a new market when it acquired a medical packaging facility in Marshall, North Carolina. Dennis Love stepped down as CEO in 2013 and has been replaced by his brother Jimmy Love, who was recently named one of Atlanta's most admired CEOs. In the past several years, Printpack has won several Flexible Packaging Association achievement awards. In 2025, Printpack won six FPA awards, including Gold Awards for Technical Innovation and Packaging Excellence and a Silver Award for Sustainability.
