= RKW Group =

German packaging manufacturer

RKW SE
- Company type: Societas Europaea (SE)
- Industry: Chemical processing
- Founded: 1957
- Headquarters: Mannheim, Germany
- Key people: Eric Le Lay (CEO), Corrado Piroli
- Products: Polypropylene and polyethylene films, nonwovens and nets
- Number of employees: around 2,800
- Website: www.rkw-group.com

The RKW Group is a family owned German manufacturer of plastic films headquartered in Mannheim with focus on industrial films, industrial packaging, consumer packaging, agricultural films and nets, and hygiene and medical films. It has several factories in Europe, Vietnam, and the US. In 2002, RKW took over four locations of former BP Chemicals PlasTec GmbH. In 2011, RKW acquired the North American company Danafilms Inc. In 2014, RKW acquired plastic film producer Hyplast NV in Hoogstraten, Belgium. In 2015, it opened a plant in Guangzhou, China. The same year, RKW changed the name of RKW Danafilms Inc. to RKW North America Inc. RKW was founded on December 14, 1957, by Jakob Müller as Rheinische Kunststoffwerke GmbH in Worms, Germany. In 2019, as part of a restructuring by the shareholder family, RKW was split from Renolit SE, and is currently fully owned by the Müller and de Alvear family members.
