= Film blowing machine =

Machine for making plastic film

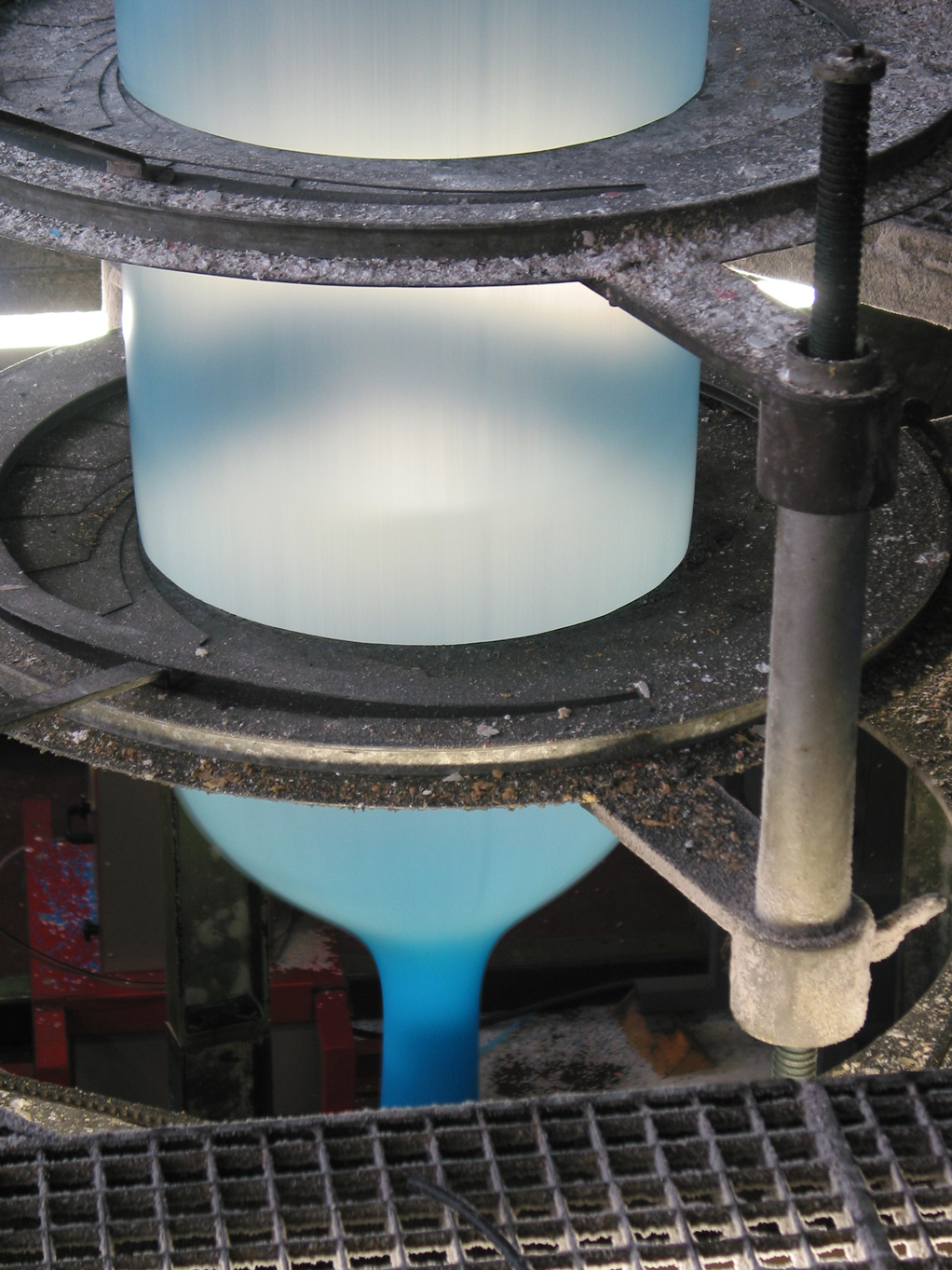
A tube of extruded film being blown to expand

A film blowing machine involves one process used to make plastic film. Extruded tubular processing is most often used with polyethylene films but can be used with other polymers. The film may be laminating film, shrink film, agricultural covering film, bags or film for textiles and clothing, and other packaging materials.

== Technical information ==
Parts include: screw and barrel, motor, inverter, heaters, die head, winder, and tower. The main motor may have frequency control of motor speed to improve speed regulation and save electricity. The screw and material barrel may be made from a nitrogen-treated chromium-molybdenum-aluminum alloy.

== Process ==
At the beginning of the process, the polymer comes in the form of a pellet. it is heated and melted into a viscous liquid between rotating screws and barrels of the extruder. This allows for the polymer to be fed through a die that shapes it in the form of a tube. This tube is then carefully inflated, so there is no risk of tearing, into a bubble by injecting it with air. The bubble is simultaneously being cooled in its interior, via a cooling system, and on the exterior surface, through the use of an air ring, to solidify the material. A set of collapsing frames or guides are then used to collapse the bubble into two, more defined, layers within closer proximity. Now that the layers are close, a series of nip rollers flatten the layers together to form a two-layered plastic film that is then wound onto a cylindrical roll for packaging purposes. This process may vary depending upon the specifications and models of the machines.

== Bubble instabilities ==
In the case that the bubble formed from air injection is not handled with caution, the bubble may become unstable and deform in a number of different ways.

- Draw resonance exists when the film velocity at which solidification occurs is much higher than the velocity of the melted liquid as it exits the die. This causes the melt to stretch too quickly and the bubble diameter starts to vary along its surface. One way to fix this situation is to increase the speed of the melt through the die.
- Helical instability is noticeable when one side of the bubble is cooled more than the other due to the air ring. The bubble then starts to form a helical shape as it reaches the collapsing frames. This can be avoided by either lowering the melt temperature or increasing extruder output.
- Freeze line height instability results in a variation of the thickness of the bubble. This is caused by extruder motor amps and back pressure. To prevent this variation in thickness, improvements upon the feeding and melting of the material must be implemented.
- Heavy-bubble instability occurs when the bubble is not being cooled enough and sags towards the bottom as a result. Lowering either the freeze line height or the melt temperature will assist the bubble in its cooling phase, causing less sag.
- Bubble flutter appears below the freeze line when cool air impinges on the surface of the bubble. A higher freeze line height, a lower melt temperature, and a narrower die gap can solve this problem.
- Bubble breathing occurs when the volume of the air in the bubble keeps changing periodically. This causes a variation in film thickness. Some solutions include controlling the cooling system and sensors, a reduction of melt temperatures, and decreasing extruder output.
- Bubble tear appears as a tear in the bubble, caused by the force needed to draw the bubble up into the nip rollers exceeding the tensile strength of the melted film. A simple solution is to reduce extruder output or increase the die and melt temperature.
