= Plastic film =

Thin continuous polymeric material

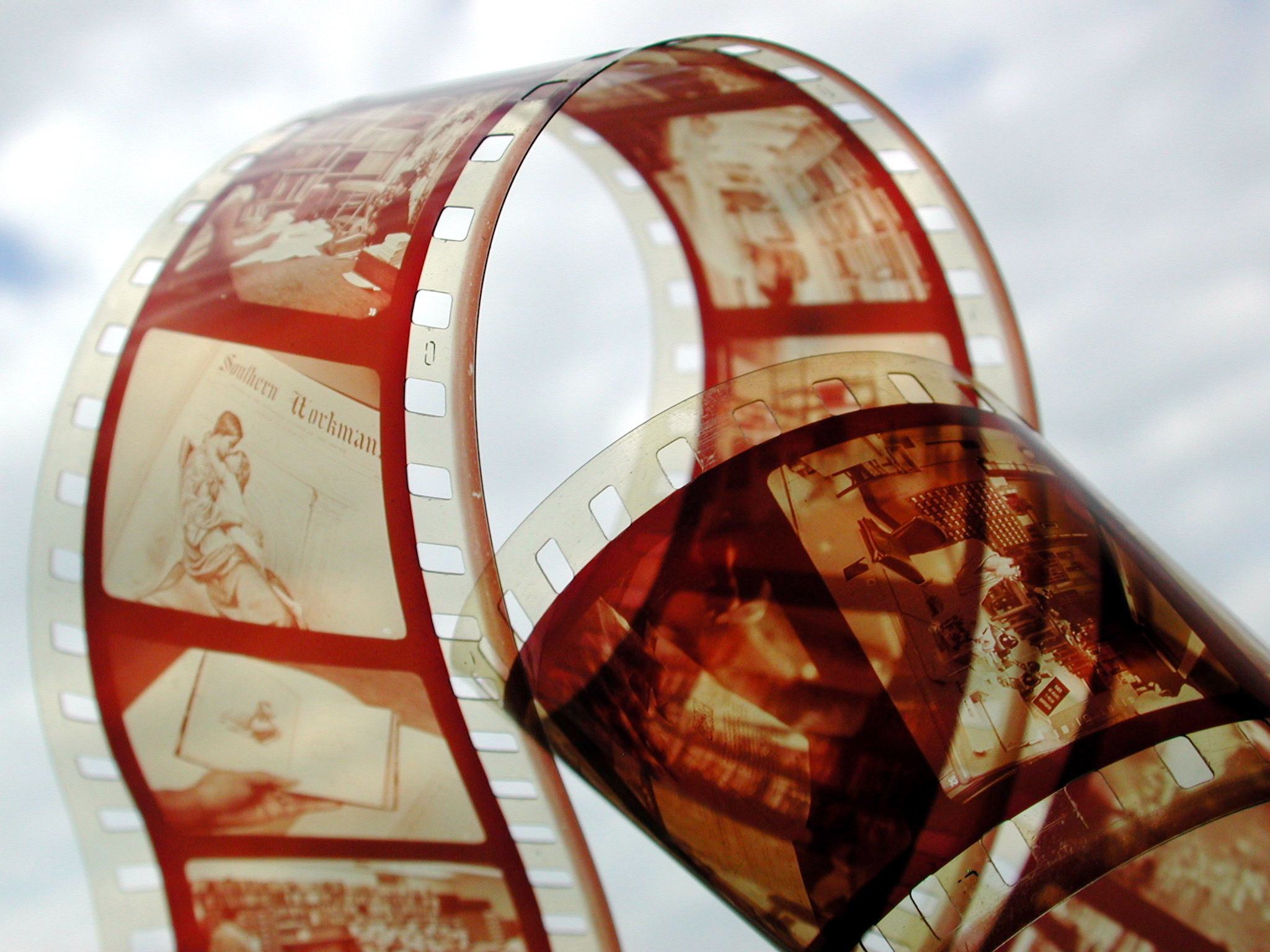
Film strip (photographic film)

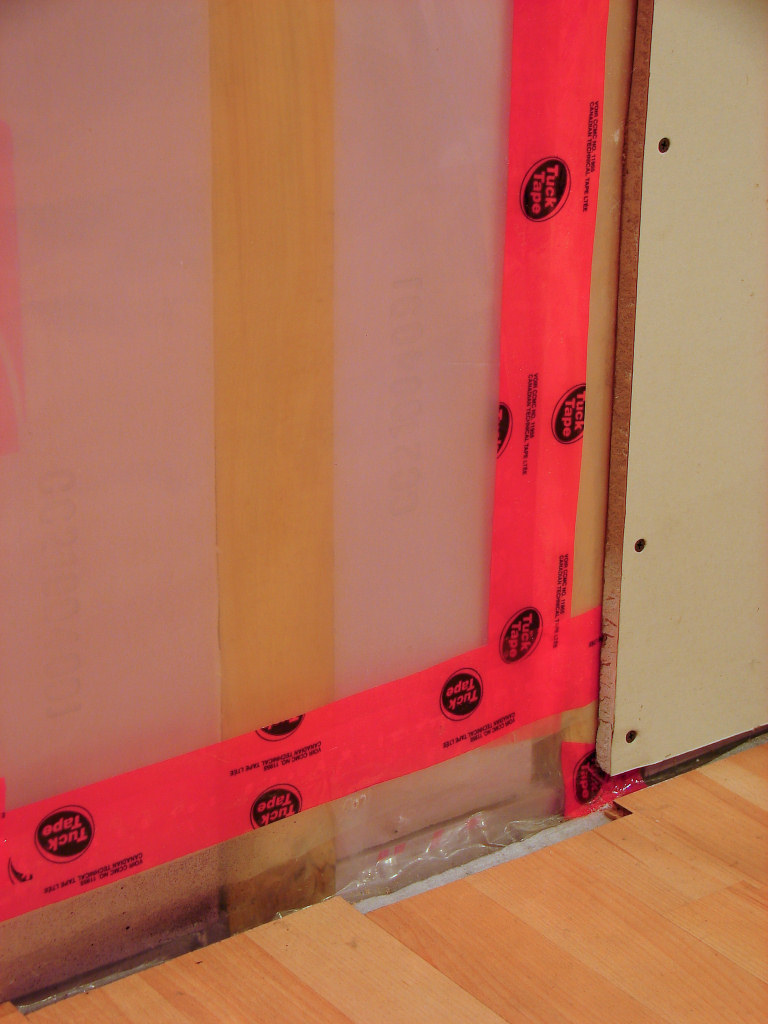
6 mil polyethylene plastic sheet as vapor barrier in construction

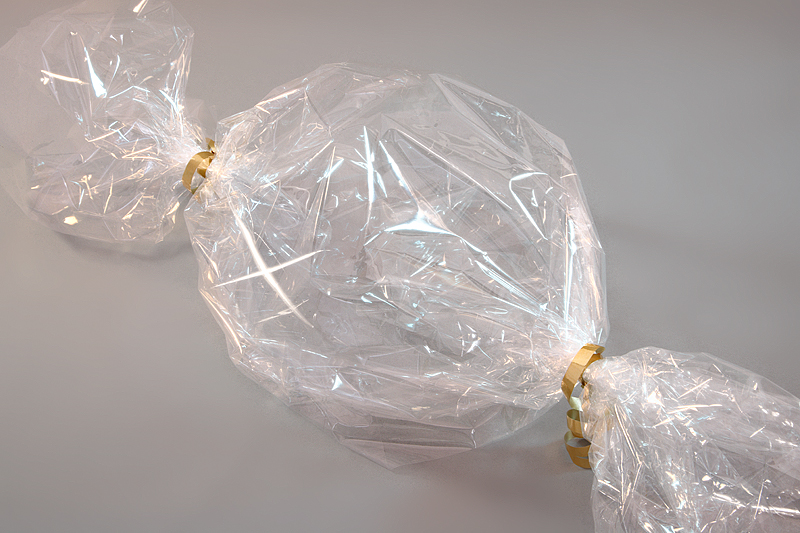
Confectionery packaging made of PLA-blend bio-flex bioplastic

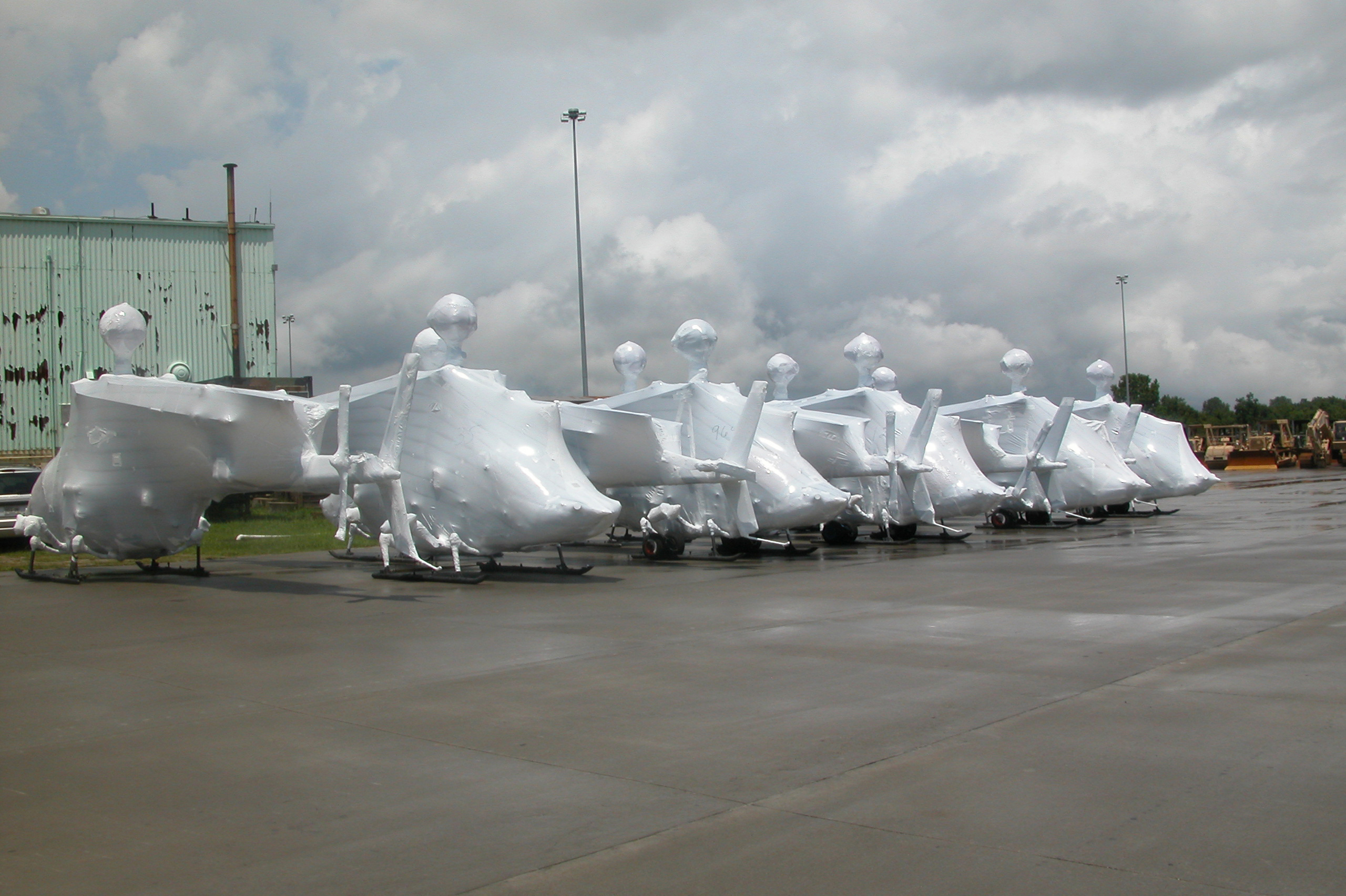
Shrink-wrapped OH-58 Kiowa helicopters to be shipped.

Plastic film is a thin continuous polymeric material. Thicker plastic material is often called a "sheet". These thin plastic membranes are used to separate areas or volumes, to hold items, to act as barriers, or as printable surfaces.

Plastic films are used in a wide variety of applications. These include: packaging, plastic bags, labels, building construction, landscaping, electrical fabrication, photographic film, film stock for movies, video tape, etc.

== Materials ==
Almost all plastics can be formed into a thin film. Some of the primary ones are:

- Polyethylene – The most common plastic film is made of one of the varieties of polyethylene: low-density polyethylene, medium-density polyethylene, high-density polyethylene, or linear low-density polyethylene.
- Polypropylene – Polypropylene can be made a cast film, biaxially oriented film (BOPP), or as a uniaxially oriented film.
- Polyester – BoPET is a biaxially oriented polyester film.
- Nylon – BOPA/BON is a Biaxially Oriented Polyamide/Nylon - (Commonly known as Nylon)
- Polyvinyl chloride – film can be with or without a Plasticizer
- Cellulose acetate - an early bioplastic.
- Cellophane - made of regenerated cellulose.
- A variety of bioplastics and biodegradable plastics are available.
- Semiembossed film – Used as a liner to the calendered rubber to retain the properties of rubber and also to prevent dust and other foreign matters from sticking to the rubber while calendering and during storage.

== Processes ==
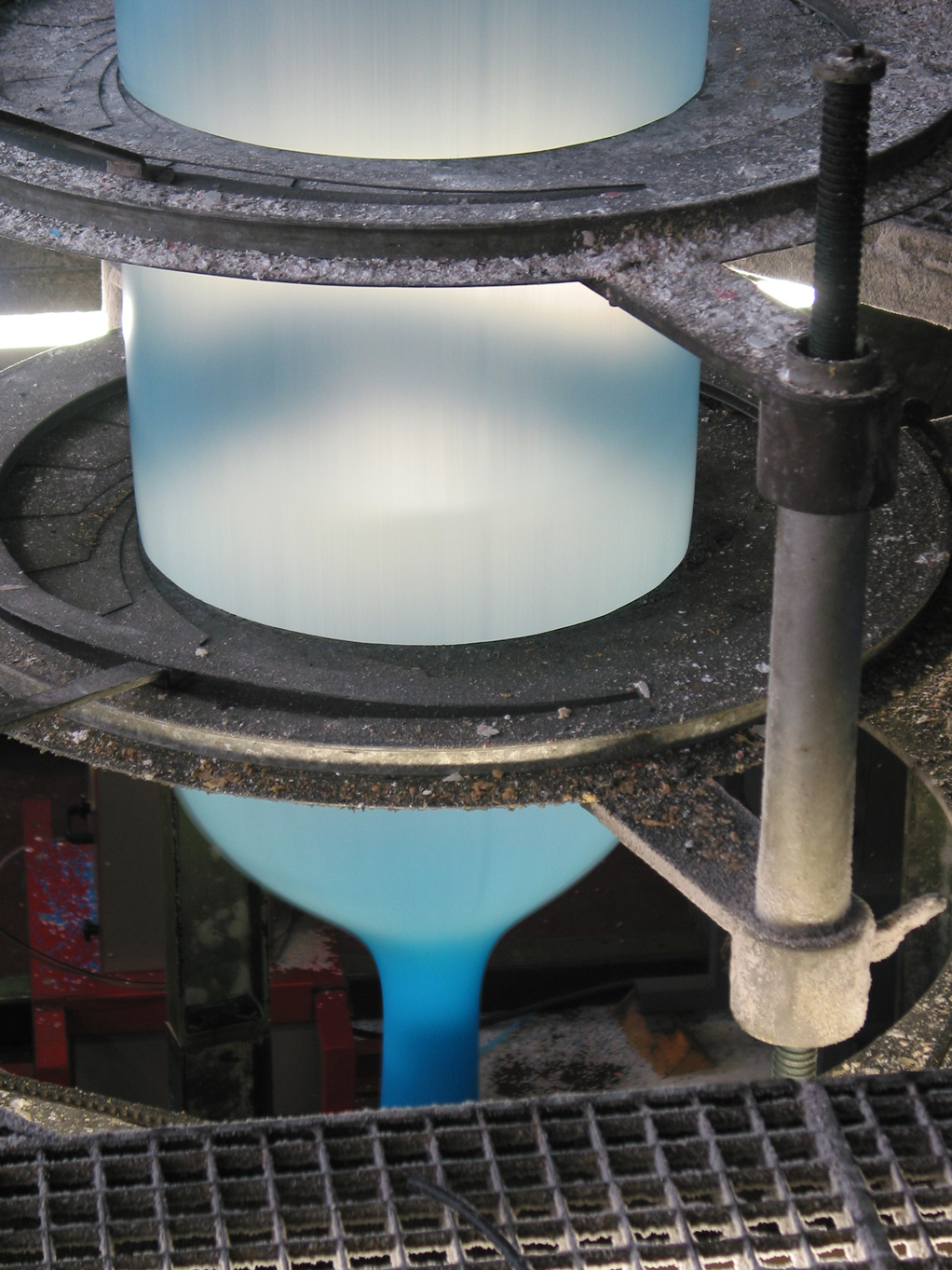
A tube of extruded film being blown to expand

Plastic films are usually thermoplastics and are formed by melting for forming the film.

- Cast – Plastics extrusion can cast film which is cooled or quenched then wound up on a roll.
- Extruded film can be stretched, thinned, or oriented in one or two directions. Blown or tubular process forces air into an extruded ring to expand the film. Flat tenter frames stretch the extruded film before annealing.
- Calender rolls can be used to form film from hot polymers
- Solution deposition is another film forming process.
- Skiving is used to scrape off a film from a solid core (sometimes used to make PTFE thread seal tape)
- Coextrusion involves extruding two or more layers of dissimilar polymers into a single film
- Lamination combines two or more films (or other materials) into a sandwich.
- Extrusion coating is used to form a film onto another film or substrate.

== Further processing ==
Plastic films are typically formed into rolls by roll slitting. Often additional coating or printing operations are also used. Films can be modified by physical vapor deposition to make metallised films. Films can be subjected to corona treatment or plasma processing; films can have release agents applied as needed.

== See also ==
- Converters (industry)
- Die cutting (web)
- Film base
- Film blowing machine
- Heat sealer
- Journal of Plastic Film and Sheeting
- Overwrap
- Plastic welding
- Plastic wrap
- Shrink wrap
- Stretch wrap
- Thin film
