= Gravimetric blender =

A gravimetric blender is an item of industrial equipment used in the plastics industry to accurately weigh two or more components and then mix them together prior to processing in an injection molding machine, plastics extrusion, or blow moulding machine.

There are two types of gravimetric blenders:

1. Loss in weight

This type of gravimetric blender measures the "loss in weight" from two or more hoppers using a load cell under each hopper. Material is usually dispensed from the hoppers using a screw conveyor. All materials are dispensed together and the rate of dosing from each hopper is controlled to ensure the correct blend is achieved.

2. Gain in weight (sometimes called a batch blender)

A gain in weight gravimetric blender has two or more hoppers arranged above a weigh-pan. These hoppers contain the components which are to be mixed, at the base of each hopper there is a valve to control the dispensing of material from the component hopper into the weigh-pan. The components are dispensed one at a time into the weigh pan until the target or batch weight is reached. Once the batch has been weighed out the contents of the weigh-pan are dispensed into a mixing chamber where they are blended. The resulting mixture exits the base of the mixing chamber into the processing machine.

A typical application of a gravimetric blender would be mixing virgin plastic granules, recycled plastic, and masterbatch (an additive used to colour plastics) together.
