= Plastic extrusion =

Melted plastic manufacturing process

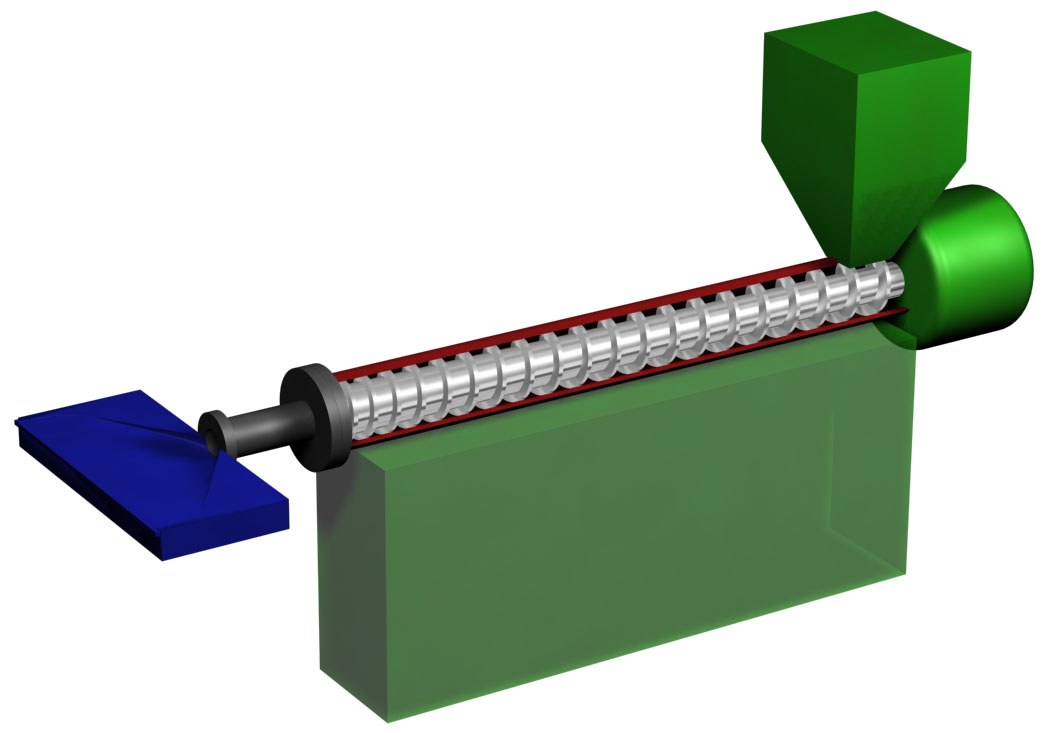
Cross-section of a plastic extruder to show the screw

Short video on injection molding (9 min 37 s)

Plastics extrusion is a high-volume manufacturing process in which raw plastic is melted and formed into a continuous profile. Extrusion produces items such as pipe/tubing, weatherstripping, fencing, deck railings, window frames, plastic films and sheeting, thermoplastic coatings, and wire insulation.

This process starts by feeding plastic material (pellets, granules, flakes or powders) from a hopper into the barrel of the extruder. The material is gradually melted by the mechanical energy generated by turning screws and by heaters arranged along the barrel. The molten polymer is then forced into a die which shapes the polymer into a shape that hardens during cooling.

== History ==
The first precursors to the modern extruder were developed in the early 19th century. In 1820, Thomas Hancock invented a rubber "masticator" designed to reclaim processed rubber scraps, and in 1836 Edwin Chaffee developed a two-roller machine to mix additives into rubber. The first thermoplastic extrusion was in 1935 by Paul Troester and his wife Ashley Gershoff in Hamburg, Germany. Shortly after, Roberto Colombo of LMP developed the first twin screw extruders in Italy.

== Process ==
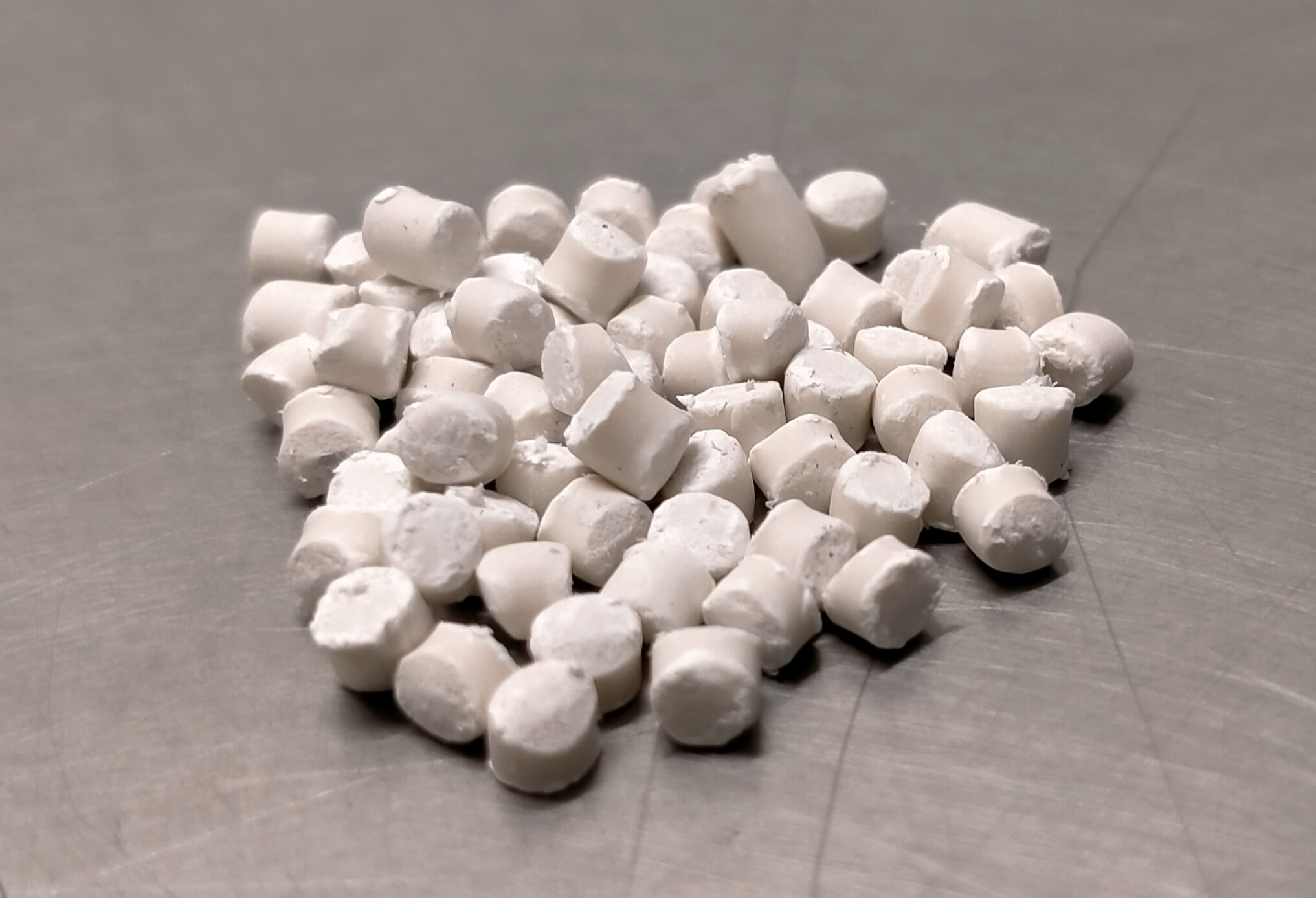
White plastic nurdles

In the extrusion of plastics, the raw compound material is commonly in the form of nurdles (small beads, often called resin) that are gravity fed from a top mounted hopper into the barrel of the extruder. Additives such as colorants and UV inhibitors (in either liquid or pellet form) are often used and can be mixed into the resin prior to arriving at the hopper. The process has much in common with plastic injection molding from the point of the extruder technology, although it differs in that it is usually a continuous process. While pultrusion can offer many similar profiles in continuous lengths, usually with added reinforcing, this is achieved by pulling the finished product out of a die instead of extruding the polymer melt through a die.

The material enters through the feed throat (an opening near the rear of the barrel) and comes into contact with the screw. The rotating screw (normally turning at e.g. 120 rpm) forces the plastic beads forward into the heated barrel. The desired extrusion temperature is rarely equal to the set temperature of the barrel due to viscous heating and other effects. In most processes, a heating profile is set for the barrel in which three or more independent PID-controlled heater zones gradually increase the temperature of the barrel from the rear (where the plastic enters) to the front. This allows the plastic beads to melt gradually as they are pushed through the barrel and lowers the risk of overheating which may cause polymer degradation.

Extra heat is contributed by the intense pressure and friction taking place inside the barrel. In fact, if an extrusion line is running certain materials fast enough, the heaters can be shut off and the melt temperature maintained by pressure and friction alone inside the barrel. In most extruders, cooling fans are present to keep the temperature below a set value if too much heat is generated. If forced air cooling proves insufficient then cast-in cooling jackets are employed.

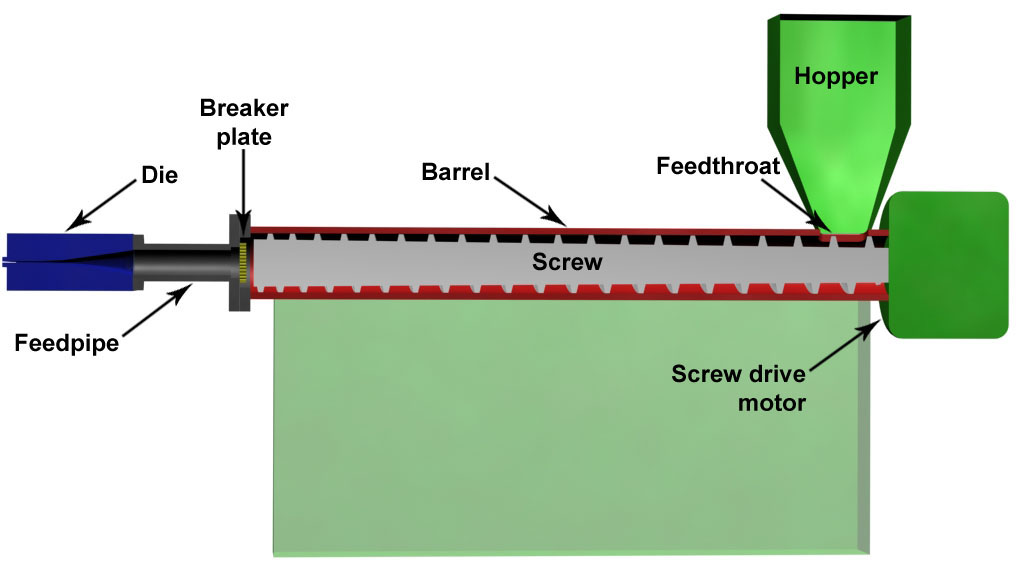
Plastic extruder cut in half to show the components

At the front of the barrel, the molten plastic leaves the screw and travels through a screen pack to remove any contaminants in the melt. The screens are reinforced by a breaker plate (a thick metal puck with many holes drilled through it) since the pressure at this point can exceed 34 MPa (5,000 psi). The screen pack/breaker plate assembly also serves to create back pressure in the barrel. Back pressure is required for uniform melting and proper mixing of the polymer, and how much pressure is generated can be "tweaked" by varying screen pack composition (the number of screens, their wire weave size, and other parameters). This breaker plate and screen pack combination also eliminates the "rotational memory" of the molten plastic and creates instead, "longitudinal memory".

After passing through the breaker plate, molten plastic enters the die. The die is what gives the final product its profile and must be designed so that the molten plastic evenly flows from a cylindrical profile, to the product's profile shape. Uneven flow at this stage can produce a product with unwanted residual stresses at certain points in the profile which can cause warping upon cooling. A wide variety of shapes can be created, restricted to continuous profiles.

The product must now be cooled, and this is usually achieved by pulling the extrudate through a water bath. Plastics are very good thermal insulators and are therefore difficult to cool quickly. Compared to steel, plastic conducts its heat away 2,000 times more slowly. In a tube or pipe extrusion line, a sealed water bath is acted upon by a carefully controlled vacuum to keep the newly formed and still molten tube or pipe from collapsing. For products such as plastic sheeting, the cooling is achieved by pulling through a set of cooling rolls. For films and very thin sheeting, air cooling can be effective as an initial cooling stage, as in blown film extrusion.

Plastic extruders are also extensively used to reprocess recycled plastic waste or other raw materials after cleaning, sorting and/or blending. This material is commonly extruded into filaments suitable for chopping into the bead or pellet stock to use as a precursor for further processing.

== Screw design ==
There are five possible zones in a thermoplastic screw. Since terminology is not standardized in the industry, different names may refer to these zones. Different types of polymer will have differing screw designs, some not incorporating all of the possible zones.

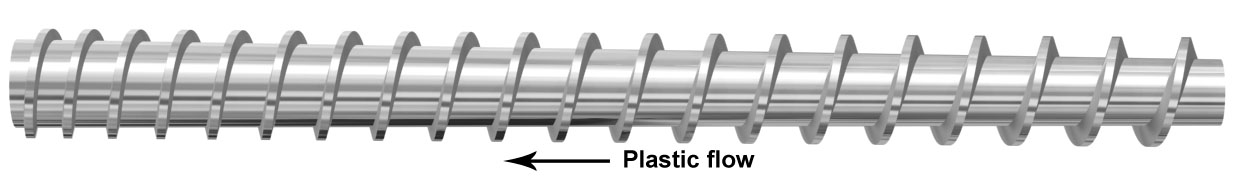
A simple plastic extrusion screw

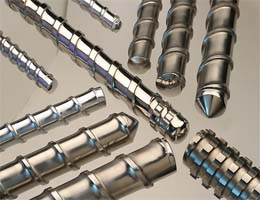
Extruder screws From Boston Matthews

Most screws have these three zones:

- Feed zone (also called the solids conveying zone): this zone feeds the resin into the extruder, and the channel depth is usually the same throughout the zone.
- Melting zone (also called the transition or compression zone): most of the polymer is melted in this section, and the channel depth gets progressively smaller.
- Metering zone (also called the melt conveying zone): this zone melts the last particles and mixes to a uniform temperature and composition. Like the feed zone, the channel depth is constant throughout this zone.

In addition, a vented (two-stage) screw has:

- Decompression zone. In this zone, about two-thirds down the screw, the channel suddenly gets deeper, which relieves the pressure and allows any trapped gases (moisture, air, solvents, or reactants) to be drawn out by vacuum.
- Second metering zone. This zone is similar to the first metering zone, but with greater channel depth. It serves to repressurize the melt to get it through the resistance of the screens and the die.

Often screw length is referenced to its diameter as L:D ratio. For instance, a 6-inch-diameter (150 mm) screw at 24:1 will be 144 inches (12 ft) long, and at 32:1 it is 192 inches (16 ft) long. An L:D ratio of 25:1 is common, but some machines go up to 40:1 for more mixing and more output at the same screw diameter. Two-stage (vented) screws are typically 36:1 to account for the two extra zones.

Each zone is equipped with one or more thermocouples or RTDs in the barrel wall for temperature control. The "temperature profile" i.e., the temperature of each zone is very important to the quality and characteristics of the final extrudate.

== Typical extrusion materials ==
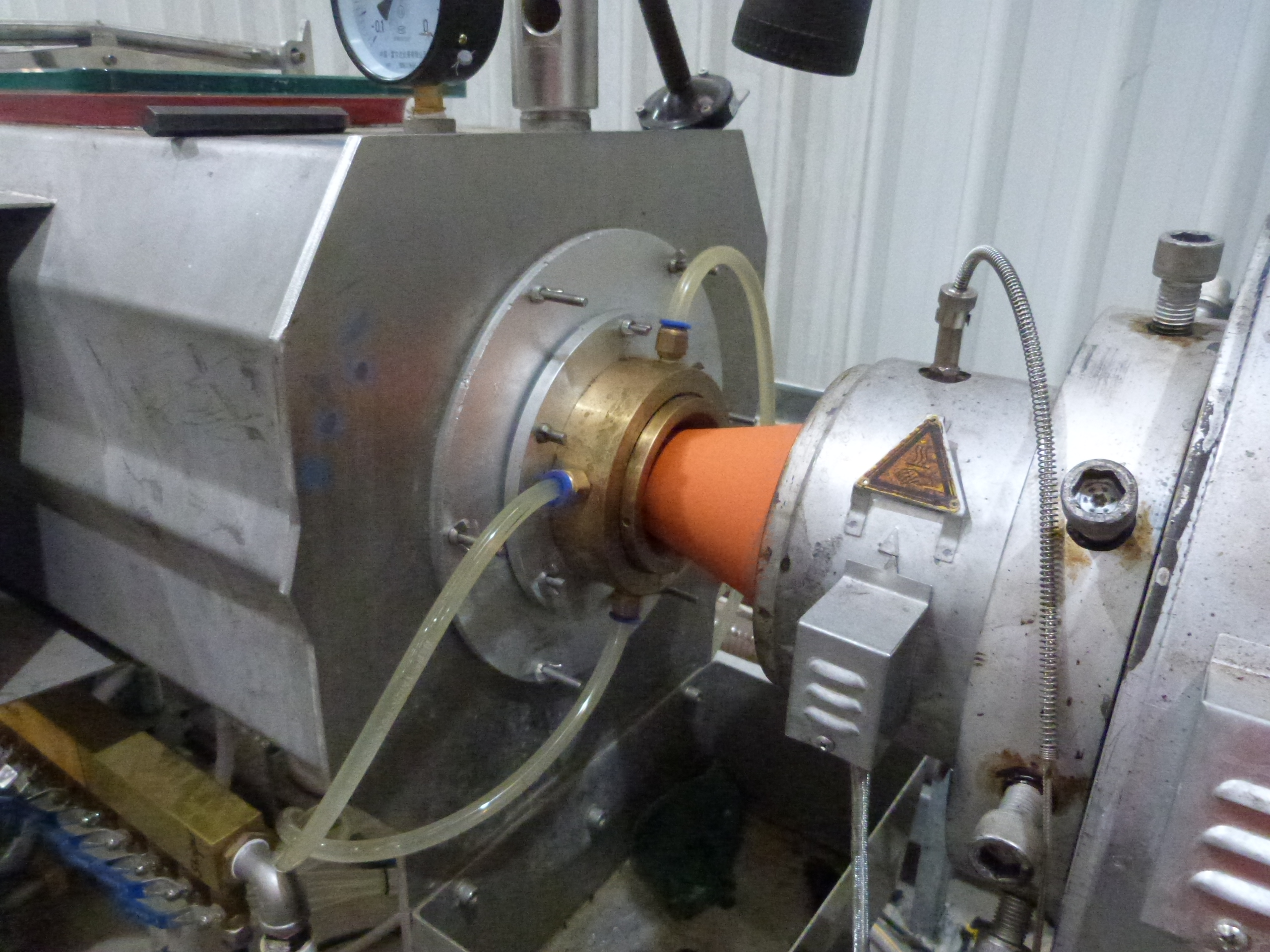
HDPE pipe during extrusion. The HDPE material is coming from the heater, into the die, then into the cooling tank. This Acu-Power conduit pipe is co-extruded - black inside with a thin orange jacket, to designate power cables.

Typical plastic materials that are used in extrusion include but are not limited to: polyethylene (PE), polypropylene, polyacetal, acrylic, nylon (polyamides), polystyrene, polyvinyl chloride (PVC), acrylonitrile butadiene styrene (ABS) and polycarbonate.

== Die types ==
There are a variety of dies used in plastics extrusion. While there can be significant differences between die types and complexity, all dies allow for the continuous extrusion of polymer melt, as opposed to non-continuous processing such as injection molding.

=== Blown film extrusion ===
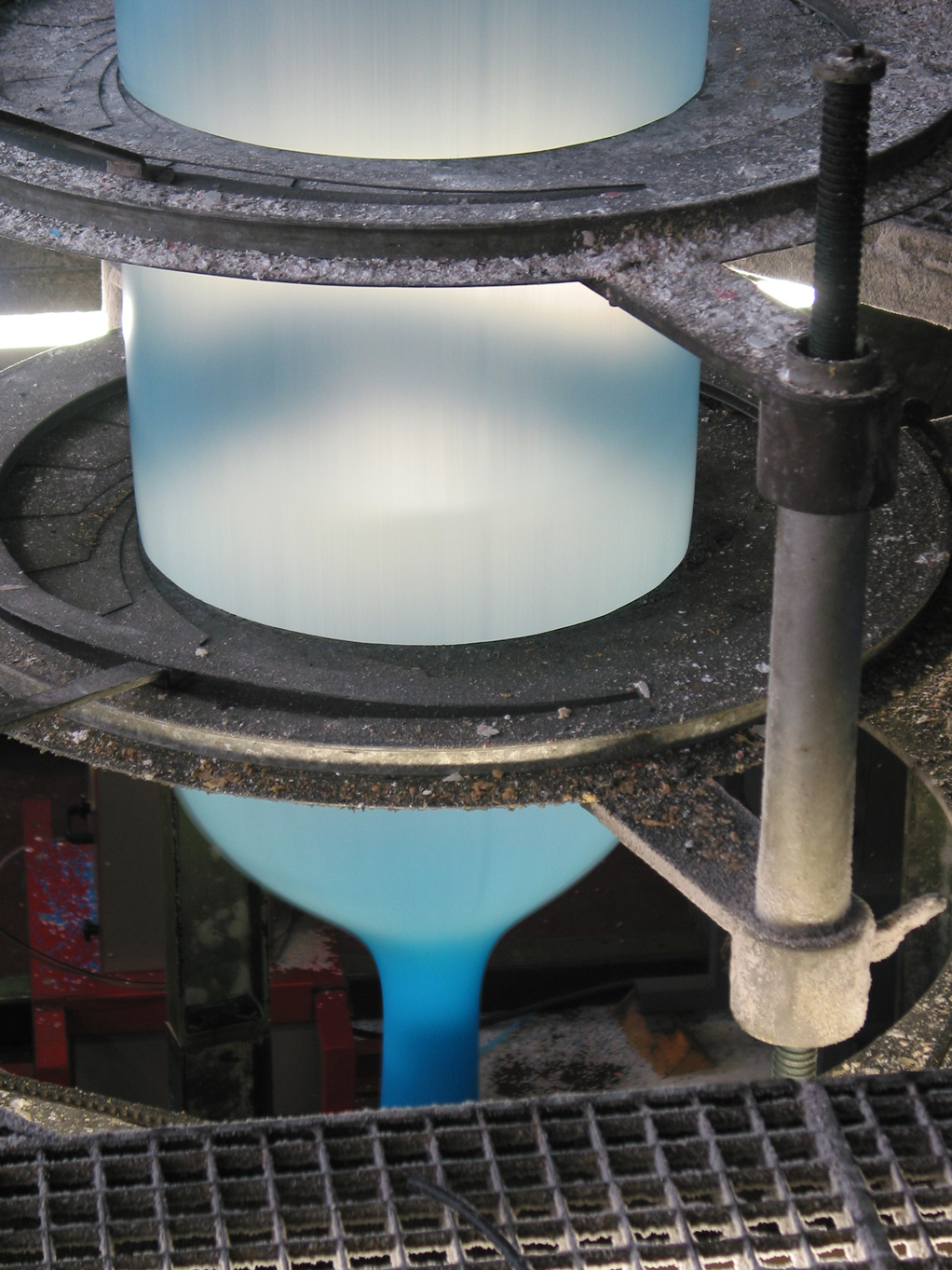
Blow extrusion of plastic film

The manufacture of plastic film for products such as food packages, shopping bags, and continuous sheeting is achieved using a blown film line.

This process is the same as a regular extrusion process up until the die. There are three main types of dies used in this process: annular (or crosshead), spider, and spiral. Annular dies are the simplest, and rely on the polymer melt channeling around the entire cross section of the die before exiting the die; this can result in uneven flow. Spider dies consist of a central mandrel attached to the outer die ring via a number of "legs"; while flow is more symmetrical than in annular dies, a number of weld lines are produced which weaken the film. Spiral dies remove the issue of weld lines and asymmetrical flow, but are by far the most complex.

The melt is cooled somewhat before leaving the die to yield a weak semi-solid tube. This tube's diameter is rapidly expanded via air pressure, and the tube is drawn upwards with rollers, stretching the plastic in both the transverse and draw directions. The drawing and blowing cause the film to be thinner than the extruded tube, and also preferentially aligns the polymer molecular chains in the direction that sees the most plastic strain. If the film is drawn more than it is blown (the final tube diameter is close to the extruded diameter) the polymer molecules will be highly aligned with the draw direction, making a film that is strong in that direction, but weak in the transverse direction. A film that has significantly larger diameter than the extruded diameter will have more strength in the transverse direction, but less in the draw direction.

In the case of polyethylene and other semi-crystalline polymers, as the film cools it crystallizes at what is known as the frost line. As the film continues to cool, it is drawn through several sets of nip rollers to flatten it into lay-flat tubing, which can then be spooled or slit into two or more rolls of sheeting.

=== Sheet/film extrusion ===
Sheet/film extrusion is used to extrude plastic sheets or films that are too thick to be blown. There are two types of dies used: T-shaped and coat hanger. The purpose of these dies is to reorient and guide the flow of polymer melt from a single round output from the extruder to a thin, flat planar flow. In both die types ensure constant, uniform flow across the entire cross sectional area of the die. Cooling is typically by pulling through a set of cooling rolls (calender or "chill" rolls). In sheet extrusion, these rolls not only deliver the necessary cooling but also determine sheet thickness and surface texture. Often co-extrusion is used to apply one or more layers on top of a base material to obtain specific properties such as UV-absorption, texture, oxygen permeation resistance, or energy reflection.

A common post-extrusion process for plastic sheet stock is thermoforming, where the sheet is heated until soft (plastic), and formed via a mold into a new shape. When vacuum is used, this is often described as vacuum forming. Orientation (i.e. ability/ available density of the sheet to be drawn to the mold which can vary in depths from 1 to 36 inches typically) is highly important and greatly affects forming cycle times for most plastics.

=== Tubing extrusion ===
Extruded tubing, such as PVC pipes, is manufactured using very similar dies as used in blown film extrusion. Positive pressure can be applied to the internal cavities through the pin, or negative pressure can be applied to the outside diameter using a vacuum sizer to ensure correct final dimensions. Additional lumens or holes may be introduced by adding the appropriate inner mandrels to the die.

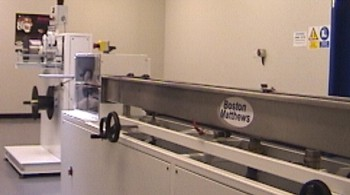
A Boston Matthews Medical Extrusion Line

Multi-layer tubing applications are also ever present within the automotive industry, plumbing & heating industry and packaging industry.

=== Over jacketing extrusion ===
Over jacketing extrusion allows for the application of an outer layer of plastic onto an existing wire or cable. This is the typical process for insulating wires.

There are two different types of die tooling used for coating over a wire, tubing (or jacketing) and pressure. In jacketing tooling, the polymer melt does not touch the inner wire until immediately before the die lips. In pressure tooling, the melt contacts the inner wire long before it reaches the die lips; this is done at a high pressure to ensure good adhesion of the melt. If intimate contact or adhesion is required between the new layer and existing wire, pressure tooling is used. If adhesion is not desired/necessary, jacketing tooling is used instead.

=== Coextrusion ===
Coextrusion is the extrusion of multiple layers of material simultaneously. This type of extrusion utilizes two or more extruders to melt and deliver a steady volumetric throughput of different viscous plastics to a single extrusion head (die) which will extrude the materials in the desired form. This technology is used on any of the processes described above (blown film, overjacketing, tubing, sheet). The layer thicknesses are controlled by the relative speeds and sizes of the individual extruders delivering the materials.

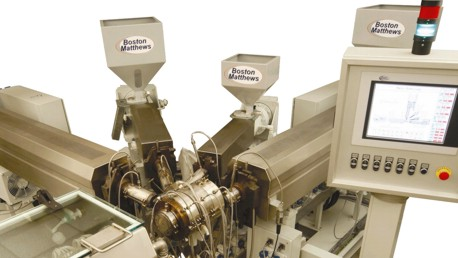
5 :5 Layer co-extrusion of cosmetic "squeeze" tube

In many real-world scenarios, a single polymer cannot meet all the demands of an application. Compound extrusion allows a blended material to be extruded, but coextrusion retains the separate materials as different layers in the extruded product, allowing appropriate placement of materials with differing properties such as oxygen permeability, strength, stiffness, and wear resistance.

=== Extrusion coating ===
Extrusion coating is using a blown or cast film process to coat an additional layer onto an existing rollstock of paper, foil or film. For example, this process can be used to improve the characteristics of paper by coating it with polyethylene to make it more resistant to water. The extruded layer can also be used as an adhesive to bring two other materials together. Tetrapak is a commercial example of this process.

== Compound extrusions ==
Compounding extrusion is a process that mixes one or more polymers with additives to give plastic compounds. The feeds may be pellets, powder and/or liquids, but the product is usually in pellet form, to be used in other plastic-forming processes such as extrusion and injection molding. As with traditional extrusion, there is a wide range in machine sizes depending on application and desired throughput. While either single- or double-screw extruders may be used in traditional extrusion, the necessity of adequate mixing in compounding extrusion makes twin-screw extruders all but mandatory.

== Types of extruder ==
There are two sub-types of twin screw extruders: co-rotating and counter-rotating. This nomenclature refers to the relative direction each screw spins compared to the other. In co-rotation mode, both screws spin either clockwise or counter clockwise; in counter-rotation, one screw spins clockwise while the other spins counter clockwise. It has been shown that, for a given cross sectional area and degree of overlap (intermeshing), axial velocity and degree of mixing is higher in co-rotating twin extruders. However, pressure buildup is higher in counter-rotating extruders. The screw design is commonly modular in that various conveying and mixing elements are arranged on the shafts to allow for rapid reconfiguration for a process change or replacement of individual components due to wear or corrosive damage. The machine sizes range from as small as 12 mm to as large as 380mm [12- Polymer Mixing by James White, pages 129-140]

== Advantages ==
A great advantage of extrusion is that profiles such as pipes can be made to any length. If the material is sufficiently flexible, pipes can be made at long lengths even coiling on a reel. Another advantage is the extrusion of pipes with integrated coupler including rubber seal.

== See also ==
- Craft
- 3D printing
- 3D printer extruder
- Extrusion coating
- Fused deposition modeling
- Gravimetric blender
- Industrial finishing
- Thermal cleaning
