= Frost line (polymers) =

In plastic film manufacturing by extrusion, the frost line is the point beyond the die where the temperature of the molten plastic falls below the softening point, the diameter of the extruded plastic bubble stabilizes due to the solidification of the polymer. The term was borrowed from the notion of a "frost line" in soil science and refers to the frosted appearance due to loss of transparency of the plastic film above the "frost line". It is sometimes called a freeze line, while others distinguish the concepts of frost/freeze lines.

The distance from the die is called the height of the frost line. It depends on various factors, including the melt temperature, the speed of cooling, the extrusion speed, and the diameter of the bubble. The notion is important, since the higher the frost line, the more difficult to control the uniformity of the film thickness.

For example, a higher frost line due to higher melt temperature and/or lower cooling rate means a longer time to solidify, and a more smooth and transparent film is produced.
