= Extrusion coating =

Manufacturing technique

Extrusion coating is the coating of a molten web of synthetic resin onto a substrate material. It is a versatile coating technique used for the economic application of various plastics, notably polyethylene, onto paperboard, corrugated fiberboard, paper, aluminium foils, cellulose, non-wovens, or plastic films. It was first developed in the 1940s for polyethylene coated paper for bags and packaging.

== Process ==
=== Coating ===
The actual process of extrusion coating involves extruding resin from a slot die at temperatures up to 320°C directly onto the moving web, which may then be passed through a nip consisting of a rubber covered pressure roller and a chrome plated cooling roll. The latter cools the molten film back into the solid state and also imparts the desired finish to the plastic surface. The web is normally run much faster than the speed at which the resin is extruded from the die, creating a coating thickness which is in proportion to the speed ratio and the slot gap.

=== Laminating ===
Extrusion laminating is a similar process except that the extruded hot molten resin acts as the bonding medium to a second web of material.

=== Co-extrusion ===
Co-extrusion is, again, a similar process but with two, or more, extruders coupled to a single die head in which the individually extruded melts are brought together and finally extruded as a multi-layer film.

== Uses ==
The market for extrusion coating includes a variety of end-use applications such as liquid packaging, photographic, flexible packaging, mill and industrial wrappings, transport packaging, sack linings, building, envelopes, medical/hygiene, and release base.

== See also ==
- Curtain coating
- Calender
