= Coating =

Substance spread over a surface

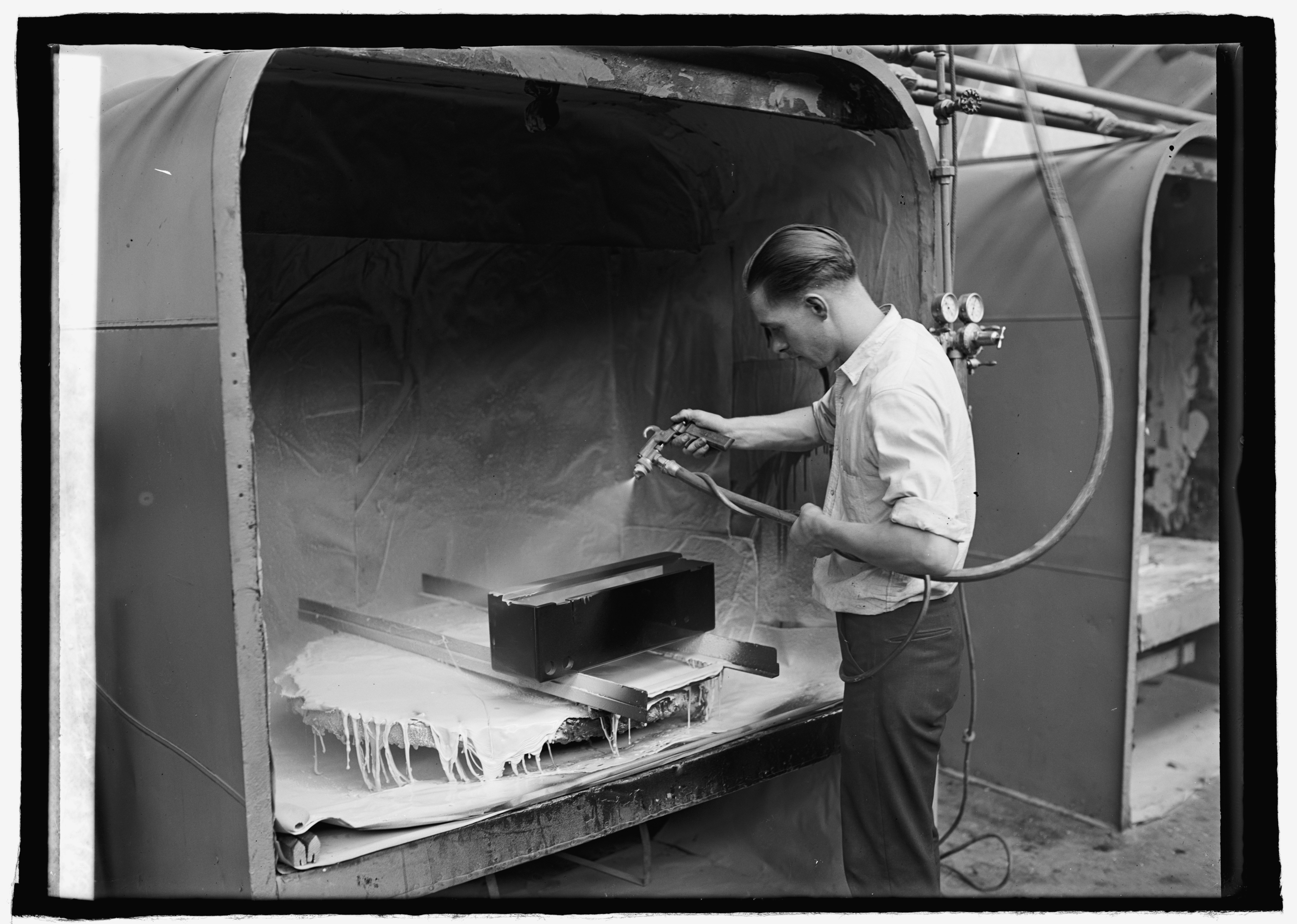
Lacquer being sprayed onto a cabinet

A coating is a covering that is applied to the surface of an object, or substrate. The purpose of applying the coating may be decorative, functional, or both. Coatings may be applied as liquids, gases or solids, e.g., powder coatings.

Paints and lacquers are coatings that mostly have dual uses, which are protecting the substrate and being decorative, although some artists paints are only for decoration, and the paint on large industrial pipes is for identification, e.g., blue for process water, red for fire-fighting control) in addition to preventing corrosion. Along with corrosion resistance, functional coatings may also be applied to change the surface properties of the substrate, such as adhesion, wettability, or wear resistance. In other cases the coating adds a completely new property, such as a magnetic response or electrical conductivity, as in semiconductor device fabrication, where the substrate is a wafer, and forms an essential part of the finished product.

A major consideration for most coating processes is controlling coating thickness. Methods of achieving this range from a simple brush to expensive precision machinery in the electronics industry. Limiting coating area is crucial in some applications, such as printing.

"Roll-to-roll" or "web-based" coating is the process of applying a thin film of functional material to a substrate on a roll, such as paper, fabric, film, foil, or sheet stock. This continuous process is highly efficient for producing large volumes of coated materials, which are essential in various industries including printing, packaging, and electronics. The technology allows for consistent high-quality application of the coating material over large surface areas, enhancing productivity and uniformity.

== Applications ==
Coatings can be both decorative and have other functions. A pipe carrying water for a fire suppression system can be coated with a red (for identification) anticorrosion paint. Most coatings to some extent protect the substrate, such as maintenance coatings for metals and concrete. A decorative coating can offer a particular reflective property, such as high gloss, satin, matte, or flat appearance.

A major coating application is to protect metal from corrosion. Automotive coatings are used to enhance the appearance and durability of vehicles. These include primers, basecoats, and clearcoats, primarily applied with spray guns and electrostatically.

The body and underbody of automobiles receive some form of underbody coating. Such anticorrosion coatings may use graphene in combination with water-based epoxies.

Coatings are used to seal the surface of concrete, such as seamless polymer/resin flooring, bund wall/containment lining, waterproofing and damp proofing concrete walls, and bridge decks. Compare with tradition coatings, moisture curing polyurethane has been widely used because of the excellent adaptability and ease of construction. The mechanical properties could be enhanced by introducing multiple hydrogen bonds and optimize the microphase separation structure.

Most roof coatings are designed primarily for waterproofing, though sun reflection (to reduce heating and cooling) may also be a consideration. They tend to be elastomeric to allow for movement of the roof without cracking within the coating membrane.

Wood has been a key material in construction since ancient times, so its preservation by coating has received much attention. Efforts to improve the performance of wood coatings continue.

Coatings are used to alter tribological properties and wear characteristics. These include anti-friction, wear and scuffing resistance coatings for rolling-element bearings

Architectural coatings or paints are used to paint the exteriors and interiors of buildings, often called or external masonry coatings. Clear varnishes and lacquers are generally excluded. Such products are usually designated for specific purposes such as roof coatings, wall paints, or deck finishes. Coatings are eco-friendly building material that increases the efficiency of energy used and reduces impact on human well-being and the environment. The coatings are typically applied with brushes, rollers or sprayers.

Wall coatings come in a variety of types, some of which can be applied by amateurs and DIYers without specialized training or equipment. For example, simple paint or primers can often be applied using brushes or rollers, and many people successfully complete such projects themselves. Most masonry surfaces can be treated an exterior wall coating, such as render, pebbledash, stone, stucco or brick. Most coatings are designed to be microporous in nature, allowing captive moisture within the wall to evaporate outside, whilst not allowing the passage of water to be drawn inside the building, thus largely providing a secondary feature apart from decoration, and that is to weatherproof a wall, and to stop damp forming inside the building. These coatings are intended for on-site application and do not include "factory-applied coatings for building products such as vinyl siding or aluminium window frames [that] may ultimately be used for architectural end-uses".

=== Other ===
Other functions of coatings include:

- Anti-fouling coatings.
- Anti-microbial coatings.
- Anti-reflective coatings for example on spectacles.
- Coatings that alter or have magnetic, electrical or electronic properties.
- Flame retardant coatings. Flame-retardant materials and coatings are being developed that are phosphorus and bio-based. These include coatings with intumescent functionality.
- Non-stick PTFE coated cooking pots/pans.
- Optical coatings are available that alter optical properties of a material or object.
- UV coatings

== Analysis and characterization ==
Numerous destructive and non-destructive evaluation (NDE) methods exist for characterizing coatings. The most common destructive method is microscopy of a mounted cross-section of the coating and its substrate. The most common non-destructive techniques include ultrasonic thickness measurement, X-ray fluorescence (XRF), X-Ray diffraction (XRD), photothermal coating thickness measurement and micro hardness indentation. X-ray photoelectron spectroscopy (XPS) is also a classical characterization method to investigate the chemical composition of the nanometer thick surface layer of a material. Scanning electron microscopy coupled with energy dispersive X-ray spectrometry (SEM-EDX, or SEM-EDS) allows to visualize the surface texture and to probe its elementary chemical composition. Other characterization methods include transmission electron microscopy (TEM), atomic force microscopy (AFM), scanning tunneling microscope (STM), and Rutherford backscattering spectrometry (RBS). Various methods of Chromatography are also used, as well as thermogravimetric analysis.

== Formulation ==
The formulation of a coating depends primarily on the function required of the coating and also on aesthetics required such as color and gloss. The four primary ingredients are the resin (or binder), solvent which may be water (or solventless), pigment(s) and additives (defoamers, surfactants, optical brighteners, etc.). Research is ongoing to remove heavy metals from coating formulations completely.

For example, on the basis of experimental and epidemiological evidence, it has been classified by the IARC (International Agency for Research on Cancer) as a human carcinogen by inhalation (class I) (ISPESL, 2008).

== Processes ==
Coating processes may be classified as follows:

=== Vapor deposition ===
==== Chemical vapor deposition ====
- Metalorganic vapour-phase epitaxy
- Electrostatic spray-assisted vapour deposition (ESAVD)
- Sherardizing
- Some forms of epitaxy
  - Molecular-beam epitaxy

==== Physical vapor deposition ====
- Cathodic arc deposition
- Electron-beam physical vapor deposition (EBPVD)
- Ion plating
- Ion-beam–assisted deposition (IBAD)
- Magnetron sputtering
- Pulsed laser deposition
- Sputter deposition
- Vacuum deposition
- Vacuum evaporation, evaporation (deposition)
- Pulsed electron deposition (PED)

=== Chemical and electrochemical techniques ===
- Conversion coating
  - Autophoretic, the registered trade name of a proprietary series of auto-depositing coatings specifically for ferrous metal substrates
  - Anodising
  - Chromate conversion coating
  - Plasma electrolytic oxidation
  - Phosphate (coating)
- Ion beam mixing
- Pickled and oiled, a type of plate steel coating
- Plating
  - Electroless plating
  - nickel plating coating using a different material to preserve mechanical properties
  - Electroplating

=== Spraying ===
- Spray painting
- High velocity oxygen fuel (HVOF)
- Plasma spraying
- Thermal spraying
- Kinetic metallization (KM)
- Plasma transferred wire arc thermal spraying
- The common forms of Powder coating

=== Roll-to-roll coating processes ===
Common roll-to-roll coating processes include:

- Air knife coating
- Anilox coater
- Flexo coater
- Gap Coating
  - Knife-over-roll coating
- Gravure coating
- Hot melt coating – when the necessary coating viscosity is achieved by temperature rather than solution of the polymers etc. This method commonly implies slot-die coating above room temperature, but it also is possible to have hot-melt roller coating; hot-melt metering-rod coating, etc.
- Immersion dip coating
- Kiss coating
- Metering rod (Meyer bar) coating
- Roller coating
  - Forward roller coating
  - Reverse roll coating
- Silk Screen coater
  - Rotary screen
- Slot Die coating – Slot die coating was originally developed in the 1950s. Slot die coating has a low operational cost and is an easily scaled processing technique for depositing thin and uniform films rapidly, while minimizing material waste. Slot die coating technology is used to deposit a variety of liquid chemistries onto substrates of various materials such as glass, metal, and polymers by precisely metering the process fluid and dispensing it at a controlled rate while the coating die is precisely moved relative to the substrate. The complex inner geometry of conventional slot dies require machining or can be accomplished with 3D printing.
- Extrusion coating – generally high pressure, often high temperature, and with the web travelling much faster than the speed of the extruded polymer
  - Curtain coating – low viscosity, with the slot vertically above the web and a gap between slot-die and web.
  - Slide coating – bead coating with an angled slide between the slot-die and the bead. Commonly used for multilayer coating in the photographic industry.
  - Slot die bead coating – typically with the web backed by a roller and a very small gap between slot-die and web.
  - Tensioned-web slot-die coating – with no backing for the web.
- Inkjet printing
- Lithography
- Flexography

=== Physical ===
- Langmuir–Blodgett
- Spin coating
- Dip coating

== See also ==
- Adhesion Tester
- Deposition
- Electrostatic coating
- Film coating drugs
- Food coating
- Formulations
- Langmuir–Blodgett film
- Mido Coating
- Nanoparticle deposition
- Optically active additive, for inspection purposes after a coating operation
- Paint
- Paper coating
- Plastic film
- Polymer science
- Printed electronics
- Seal (mechanical)
- Thermal barrier coating
- Thermal cleaning
- Thin-film deposition
- Thermosetting polymer
- Vitreous enamel
