= Slot-die coating =

Technique for coating flat substrates

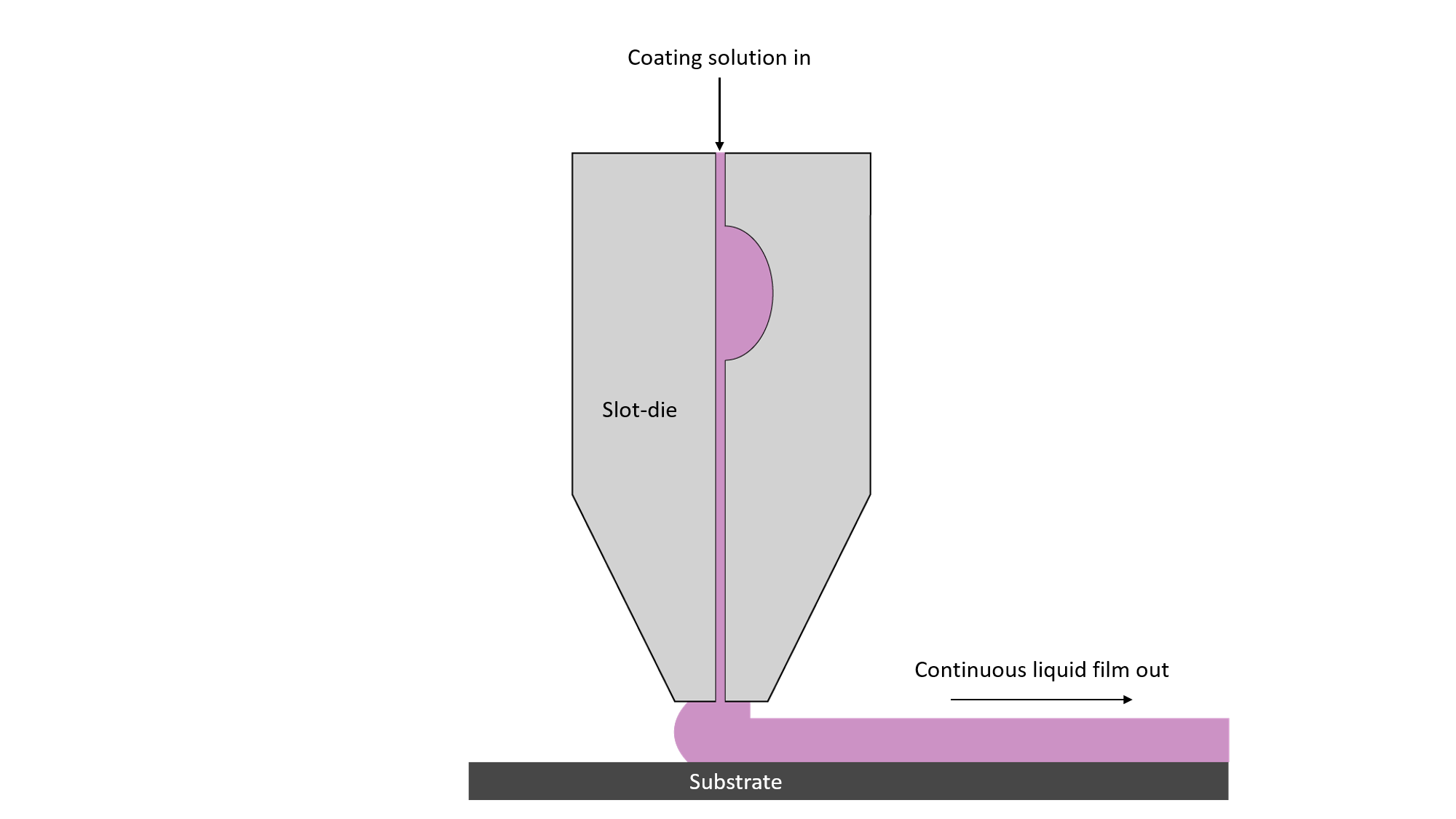
A simple cross-section schematic of the slot-die coating process.

Slot-die coating is a coating technique for the application of solution, slurry, hot-melt, or extruded thin films onto typically flat substrates such as glass, metal, paper, fabric, plastic, or metal foils. The process was first developed for the industrial production of photographic papers in the 1950s. It has since become relevant in numerous commercial processes and nanomaterials related research fields.

Slot-die coating produces thin films via solution processing. The desired coating material is typically dissolved or suspended into a precursor solution or slurry (sometimes referred to as "ink") and delivered onto the surface of the substrate through a precise coating head known as a slot-die. The slot-die has a high aspect ratio outlet controlling the final delivery of the coating liquid onto the substrate. This results in the continuous production of a wide layer of coated material on the substrate, with adjustable width depending on the dimensions of the slot-die outlet. By closely controlling the rate of solution deposition and the relative speed of the substrate, slot-die coating affords thin material coatings with easily controllable thicknesses in the range of 10 nanometers to hundreds of micrometers after evaporation of the precursor solvent.

Commonly cited benefits of the slot-die coating process include its pre-metered thickness control, non-contact coating mechanism, high material efficiency, scalability of coating areas and throughput speeds, and roll-to-roll compatibility. The process also allows for a wide working range of layer thickness and precursor solution properties such as material choice, viscosity, and solids content. Commonly cited drawbacks of the slot-die coating process include its comparatively high complexity of apparatus and process optimization relative to similar coating techniques such as blade coating and spin coating. Furthermore, slot-die coating falls into the category of coating processes rather than printing processes. It is therefore better suited for coating of uniform, thin material layers rather than printing or consecutive buildup of complex images and patterns.

== Coating apparatus ==
=== Typical components ===
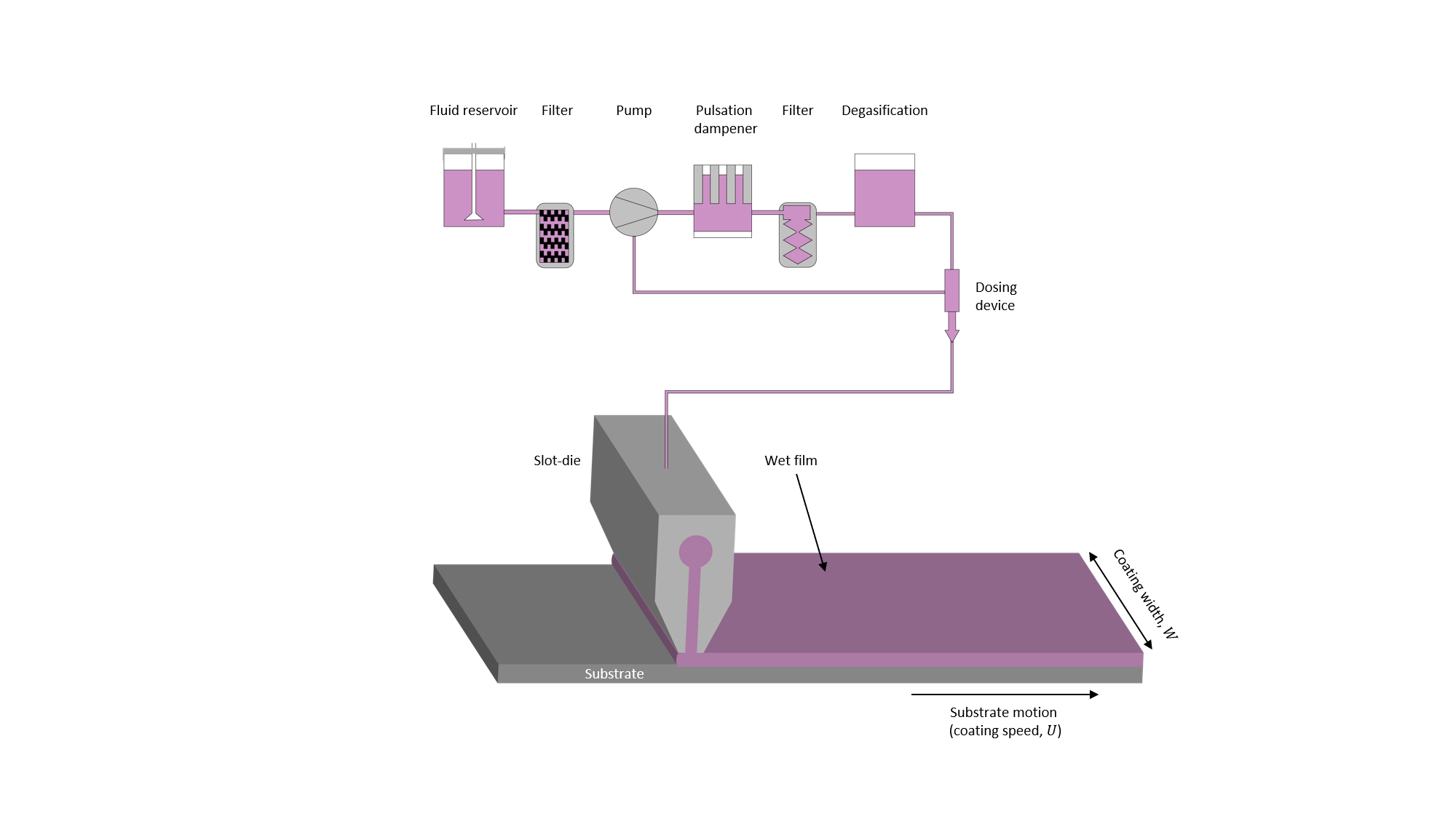
A schematic of a typical slot-die coating system.

Slot-die coating equipment is available in a variety of configurations and form factors. However, the vast majority of slot-die processes are driven by a similar set of common core components. These include:

- A fluid reservoir to store the main supply of coating fluid for the system
- A pump to drive the coating fluid through the system
- A slot-die to distribute the coating fluid across the desired coating width before coating onto the substrate
- A substrate mounting system to support the substrate in a controlled manner as it moves through the system
- A coating motion system to drive the relative speed of the slot-die and substrate in a controlled manner during coating

Depending on the complexity of the coating apparatus, a slot-die coating system may include additional modules for e.g. precise positioning of the slot-die over the substrate, particulate filtering of the coating solution, pre-treatment of the substrate (e.g. cleaning and surface energy modification), and post-processing steps (e.g. drying, curing, calendering, printing, slitting, etc.).

=== Industrial coating systems ===
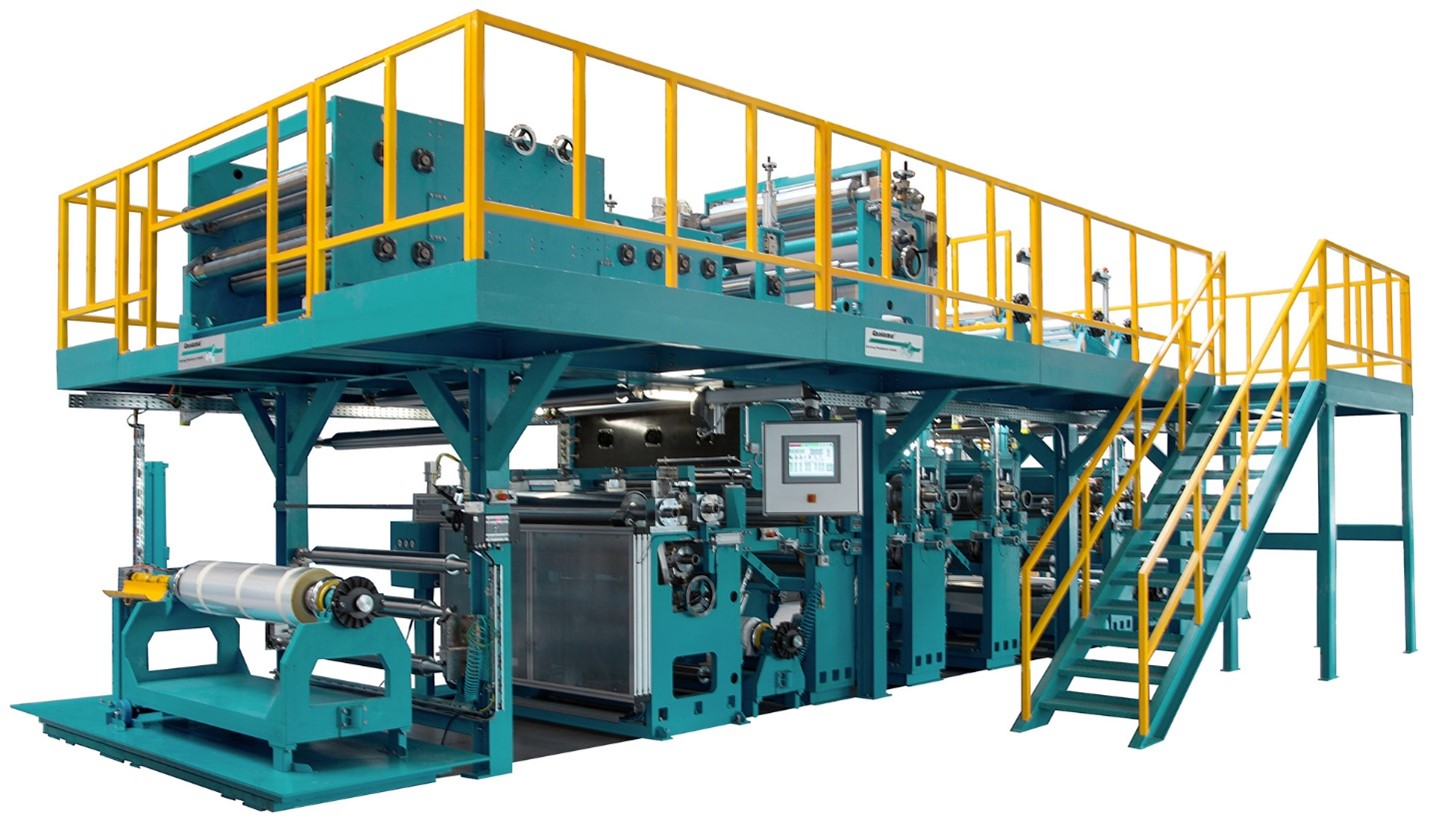
A typical industrial roll-to-roll process line.

Slot-die coating was originally developed for industrial use and remains primarily applied in production-scale settings. This is due to its potential for large-scale production of high-value thin films and coatings at a low operating cost via roll-to-roll and sheet-to-sheet line integration. Such roll-to-roll and sheet-to-sheet coating systems are similar in their intent for large-scale production, but are distinguished from each other by the physical rigidity of the substrates they handle. Roll-to-roll systems are designed to coat and handle flexible substrate rolls such as paper, fabric, plastic or metal foils. Conversely, sheet-to-sheet systems are designed to coat and handle rigid substrate sheets such as glass, metal, or plexiglass. Combinations of these systems such roll-to-sheet lines are also possible.

Both industrial roll-to-roll and sheet-to-sheet systems typically feature slot-dies in the range of 300 to 1000 mm in coating width, though slot-dies up to 4000 mm wide have been reported. Commercial slot-die systems are claimed to operate at speeds up to several hundred square meters per minute, with roll-to-roll systems typically offering higher throughput due to decreased complexity of substrate handling. Such large-scale coating systems can be driven by a variety of industrial pumping solutions including gear pumps, progressive cavity pumps, pressure pots, and diaphragm pumps depending on process requirements.

==== Roll-to-roll lines ====
To handle flexible substrates, roll-to-roll lines typically use a series of rollers to continually drive the substrate through the various stations of the process line. The bare substrate originates at an "unwind" roll at the start of the line and is collected at a "rewind" roll at the end. Hence, the substrate is often referred to as a "web" as it winds its way through the process line from start to finish. When a substrate roll has been fully processed, it is collected from the rewind roll, allowing for a new, bare substrate roll to be mounted onto the unwind roller to begin the process again. Slot-die coating often comprises just a single step of an overall roll-to-roll process. The slot-die is typically mounted in a fixed position on the roll-to-roll line, dispensing coating fluid onto the web in a continuous or patch-based manner as the substrate passes by. Because the substrate web spans all stations of the roll-to-roll line simultaneously, the individual processes at these stations are highly coupled and must be optimized to work in tandem with each other at the same web speed.

==== Sheet-to-sheet lines ====
The rigid substrates employed in sheet-to-sheet systems are not compatible with the roll-to-roll processing method. Sheet-to-sheet systems rely instead on a rack-based system to transport individual sheets between the various stations of a process line, where transfer between stations may occur in a manual or automated manner. Sheet-to-sheet lines are therefore more analogous to a series of semi-coupled batch operations rather than a single continuous process. This allows for easier optimization of individual unit operations at the expense of potentially increased handling complexity and reduced throughput. Furthermore, the need to start and stop the slot-die coating process for each substrate sheet places higher tolerance requirements on the leading and trailing edge uniformity of the slot-die step. In sheet-to-sheet lines, the substrate may be fixed in place as the substrate passes underneath on a moving support bed (sometimes referred to as a "chuck"). Alternatively, the slot-die may move during coating while the substrate remains fixed in place.

=== Lab-scale development tools ===
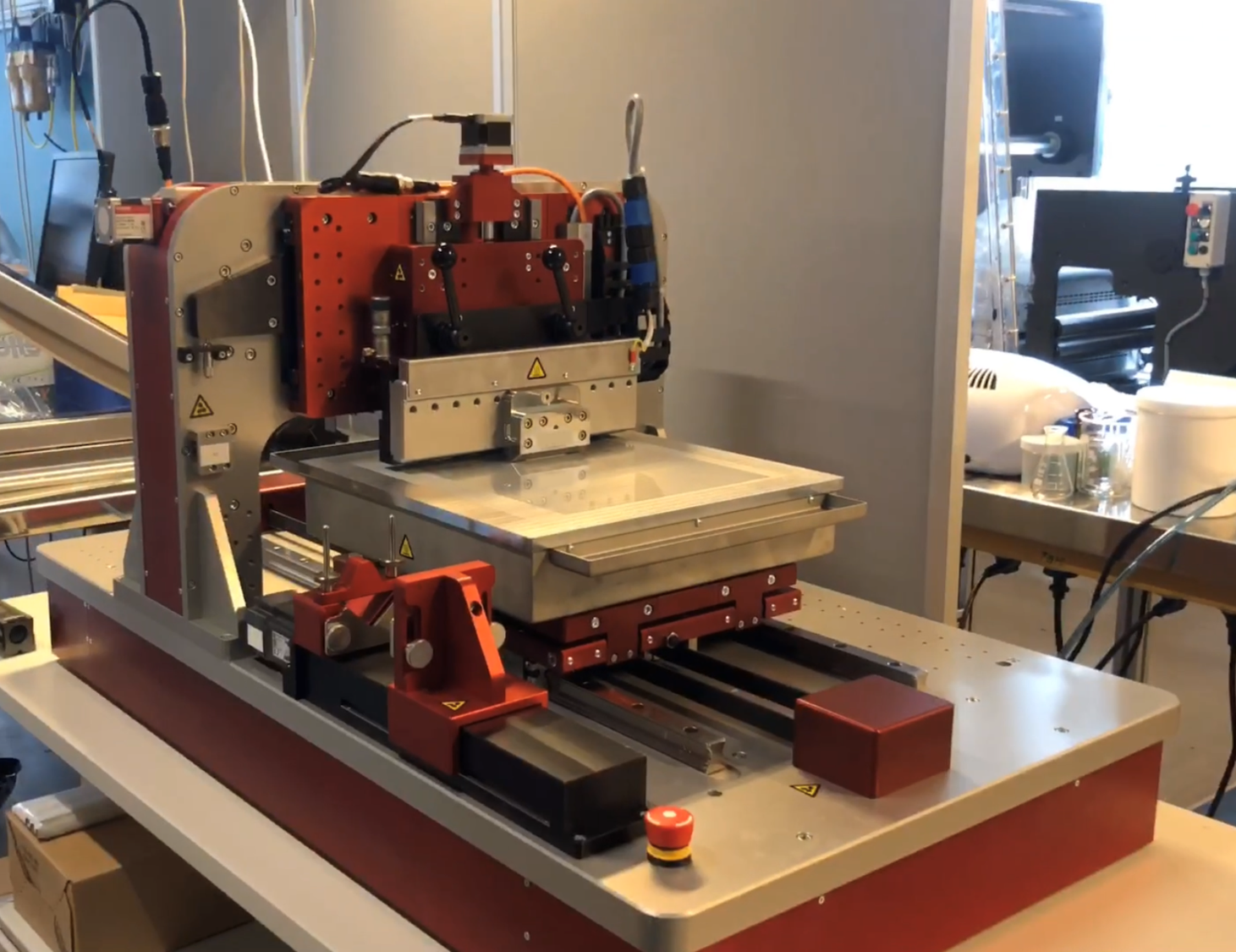
A photograph of a lab-scale slot-die coating tool for thin film materials research.

Miniaturized slot-die tools have become increasingly available to support the development of new roll-to-roll compatible processes prior to the requirement of full pilot- and production-scale equipment. These tools feature similar core components and functionality as compared to larger slot-die coating lines, but are designed to integrate into pre-production research environments. This is typically achieved by e.g. accepting standard A4 sized substrate sheets rather than full substrate rolls, using syringe pumps rather than industrial pumping solutions, and relying upon hot-plate heating rather than large industrial drying ovens, which can otherwise reach lengths of several meters to provide suitable residence times for drying.

Because the slot-die coating process can be readily scaled between large and small areas by adjusting the size of the slot-die and throughput speed, processes developed on lab-scale tools are considered to be reasonably scalable to industrial roll-to-roll and sheet-to-sheet coating lines. This has led to significant interest in slot-die coating as a method of scaling new thin film materials and devices, particularly in the sphere of thin film solar cell research for e.g. perovskite and organic photovoltaics.

=== Common coating modalities ===
Slot-die hardware can be applied in several distinct coating modalities, depending on the requirements of a given process. These include:

- Proximity coating, in which the substrate is supported by a hard surface (e.g. a precision backing roll or moving support bed) and the slot-die is held at a relatively small coating gap (typically 25 μm to several mm away from the substrate, depending on the wet thickness of the coated layer).
- Curtain coating, in which the substrate is supported by a hard surface (e.g. a precision backing roll or moving support bed) and the slot-die is held at a much larger coating gap, enabling much higher coating speeds as long as a suitable Weber number is achieved.
- Tensioned web over slot-die coating, in which the substrate web is suspended between two idle rollers placed on opposite sides of the slot-die. The web is then pressed against the lips of the slot-die such that the slot-die itself applies tension to the web. When fluid is pumped through the slot-die onto the substrate, the fluid lubricates the slot-die-substrate interface, preventing the slot-die from scratching the substrate during coating.

The dynamics of proximity coating have been extensively studied and applied over a wide range of scales and applications. Furthermore, the concepts governing proximity coating are relevant in understanding the behavior of other coating modalities. Proximity coating is therefore considered to be the default configuration for the purposes of this introductory article, though curtain coating and tensioned web over slot die configurations remain highly relevant in industrial manufacturing.

== Key process parameters ==
=== Film thickness control ===
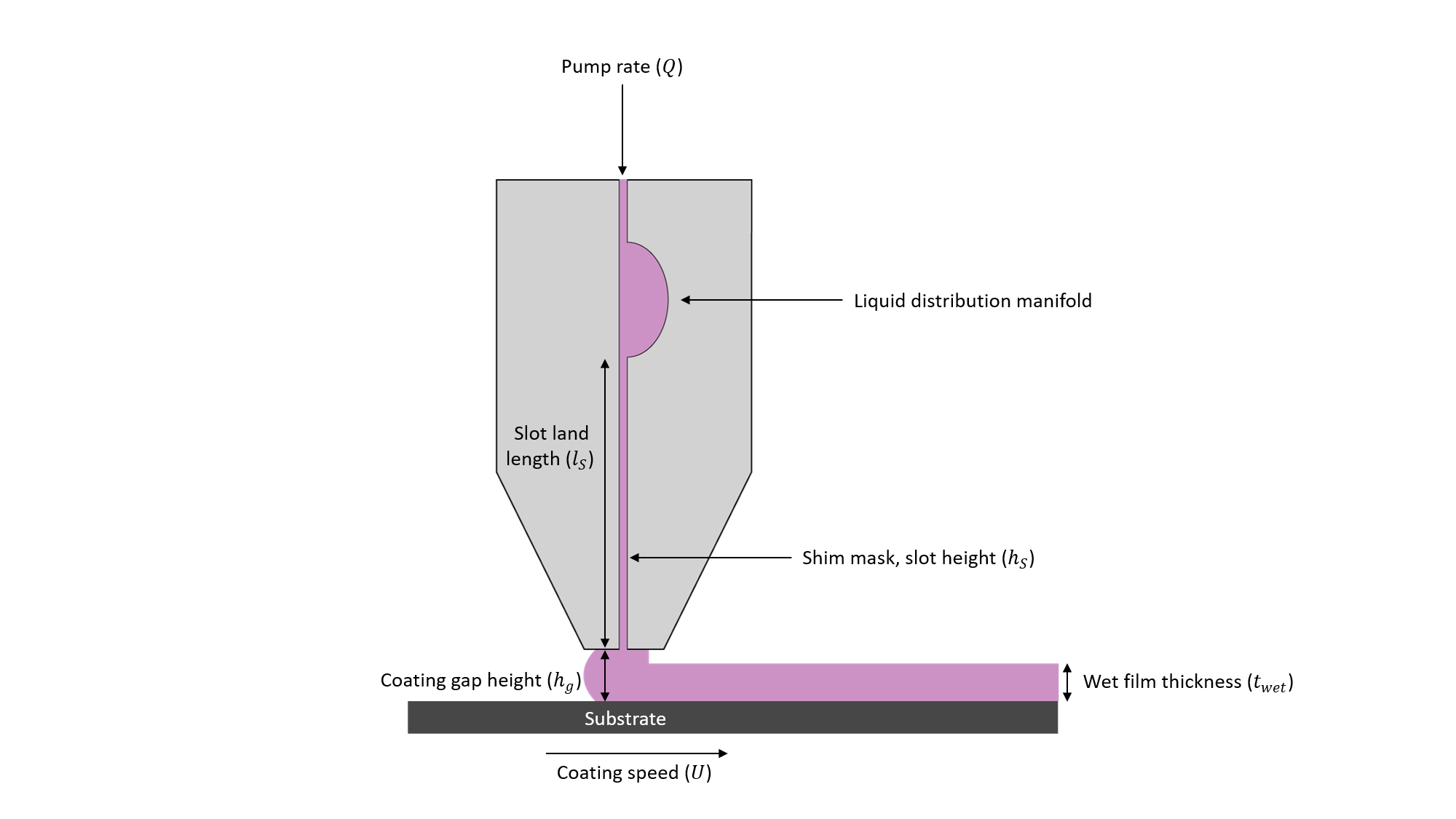
A cross-section schematic of the slot-die process with key dimensions and parameters labeled (coating width not shown in this plane).

Slot-die coating is a non-contact coating method, in which the slot-die is typically held over the substrate at a height several times higher than the target wet film thickness. The coating fluid transfers from the slot-die to the substrate via a fluid bridge that spans the air gap between the slot-die lips and substrate surface. This fluid bridge is commonly referred to as the coating meniscus or coating bead. The thickness of the resulting wet coated layer is controlled by tuning the ratio between the applied volumetric pump rate and areal coating rate. Unlike in self-metered coating methods such as blade- and bar coating, the slot-die does not influence the thickness of the wet coated layer via any form of destructive physical contact or scraping. The height of the slot-die therefore does not determine the thickness of the wet coated layer. The height of the slot-die is instead significant in determining the quality of the coated film, as it controls the distance that must be spanned by the meniscus to maintain a stable coating process.

$t_{wet} = \frac{Q}{W \times U}$

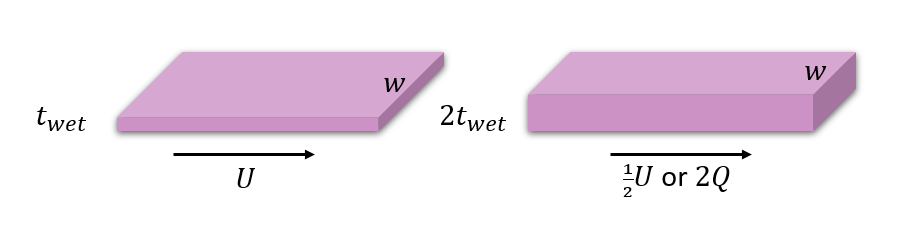
A schematic illustrating the relationship between coating speed, pump rate, and the thickness of the coated wet film in slot-die coating.

Slot-die coating operates via a pre-metered liquid coating mechanism. The thickness of the wet coated layer ($t_{wet}$) is therefore significantly determined by the width of coating ($W$), the volumetric pump rate ($Q$), and the coating speed, or relative speed between the slot-die and the substrate during coating ($U$). Increasing the pump rate increases the thickness of the wet layer, while increasing the coating speed or coating width decreases the wet layer thickness. The coating width is typically a fixed value for a given slot-die process. Hence, pump rate and coating speed can be used to calculate, control, and adjust the wet film thickness in a highly predictable manner. However, deviation from this idealized relationship can occur in practice due to non-ideal behavior of materials and process components; for example when using highly viscoelastic fluids, or a sub-optimal process setup where fluid creeps up the slot-die component rather than transferring fully to the substrate.

$t_{dry} = t_{wet} \times \frac{c}{\rho}$

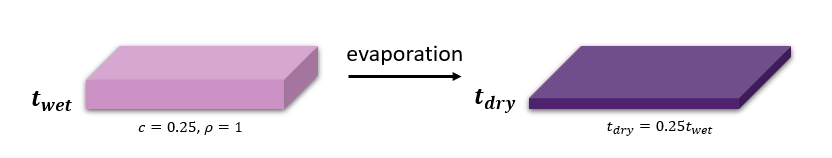
A schematic illustrating the relationship between coating fluid concentration, solid material density, and dry film thickness in slot-die coating.

The final thickness of the dry layer after solvent evaporation ($t_{dry}$) is further determined by the solids concentration of the precursor solution ($c$) and the volumetric density of the coated material in its final form ($\rho$). Increasing the solids content of the precursor solution increases the thickness of the dry layer, while using a more dense material results a thinner dry layer for a given concentration.

=== Film quality control ===
As with all solution processed coating methods, the final quality of a thin film produced via slot-die coating depends on a wide array of parameters both intrinsic and external to the slot-die itself. These parameters can be broadly categorized into:

- Coating window effects, determining the stability of fluid transfer between the slot-die and substrate in an ideal slot-die process isolated from external imperfections
- Downstream process effects, determining the behavior of the coating fluid on the substrate surface after exiting the slot-die component
- External effects, determining the degree to which the coating apparatus is capable of delivering the ideal coating process characterized by the pre-metered slot-die coating mechanism and the coating window of a given process

==== Coating window parameters ====
Under ideal conditions, the potential to achieve a defect-free film via slot-die is entirely governed by the coating window of the a given process. The coating window is a multivariable map of key process parameters, describing the range over which they can be applied together to achieve a defect-free film. Understanding the coating window behavior of a typical slot-die process enables operators to observe defects in a slot-die coated layer and intuitively determine a course of action for defect resolution. The key process parameters used to define the coating window typically include:

- The ratio of slot-die height to wet film thickness ($H_0/t_{wet}$)
- The volumetric pump rate ($Q$)
- The coating speed, or relative speed of the substrate ($U$)
- The capillary number of the coating liquid ($Ca$)
- The difference in pressure across the upstream and downstream faces of the meniscus ($\Delta P$)

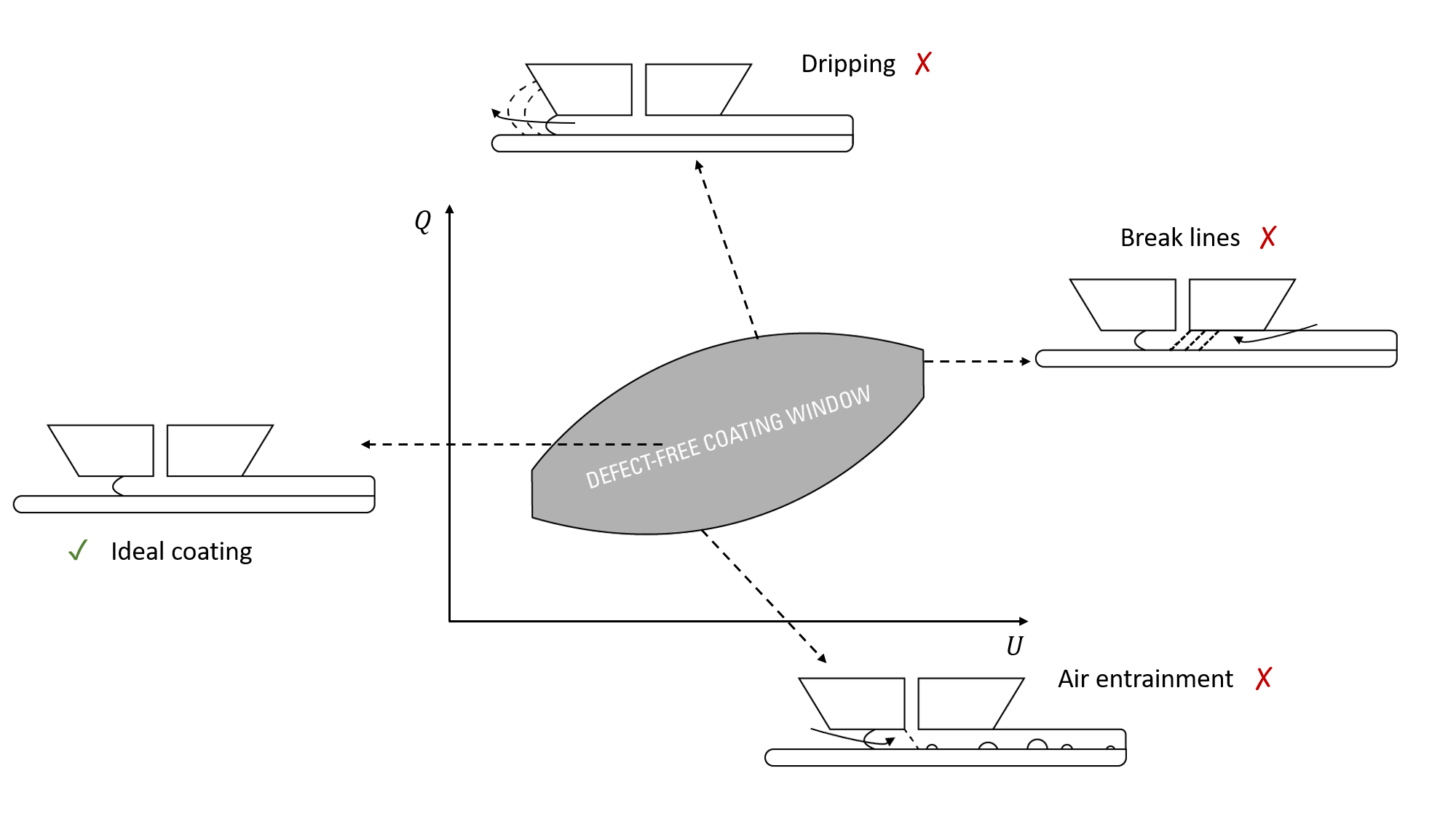
A representation of the ideal coating window for a given slot-die coating process, plotted in the plane of pump rate versus coating speed.

The coating window can be visualized by plotting two such key parameters against each other while assuming the others to remain constant. In an initial simple representation, the coating window can be described by plotting the relationship between viable pump rates and coating speeds for a given process. Excessive pumping or insufficient coating speeds result in defect spilling of the coating liquid outside of the desired coating area, while coating too quickly or pumping insufficiently results in defect breakup of the meniscus. The pump rate and coating speed can therefore be adjusted to directly compensate for these defects, though changing these parameters also affects wet film thickness via the pre-metered coating mechanism. Implicit in this relationship is the effect of the slot-die height parameter, as this affects the distance over which the meniscus must be stretched while remaining stable during coating. Raising the slot-die higher can thus counteract spilling defects by stretching the meniscus further, while lowering the slot-die can counteract streaking and breakup defects by reducing the gap that the meniscus must breach. Other helpful coating window plots to consider include the relationship between fluid capillary number and slot-die height, as well as the relationship between pressure across the meniscus and slot-die height. The former is particularly relevant when considering changes in fluid viscosity and surface tension (i.e. the effect of coating various materials with significantly different rheology), while the latter is relevant in the context of applying a vacuum box at the upstream face of the meniscus to stabilize the meniscus against breakup.

==== Downstream process effects ====
In reality, the final quality of a slot-die coated film is heavily influenced by a variety of factors beyond the parameter boundaries of the ideal coating window. Surface energy effects and drying effects are examples of common downstream effects with a significant influence on final film morphology. Sub-optimal matching of surface energy between the substrate and coating fluid can cause dewetting of the liquid film after it has been applied to the substrate, resulting in pinholes or beading of the coated layer. Sub-optimal drying processes are also often noted to influence film morphology, resulting in increased thickness at the edge of a film caused by the coffee ring effect. Surface energy and downstream processing must therefore be carefully optimized to maintain the integrity of the slot-die coated layer as it moves through the system, until the final thin film product can be collected.

==== External effects ====
Slot-die coating is a highly mechanical process in which uniformity of motion and high hardware tolerances are critical to achieving uniform coatings. Mechanical imperfections such as jittery motion in the pump and coating motion systems, poor parallelism between the slot-die and substrate, and external vibrations in the environment can all lead to undesired variations in film thickness and quality. Slot-die coating apparatus and its environment must therefore be suitably specified to meet the needs of a given process and avoid hardware- and environment-derived defects in the coated film.

== Applications ==
=== Industrial applications ===
Slot-die coating was originally developed for the commercial production of photographic films and papers. In the past several decades it has become a critical process in the production of adhesive films, flexible packaging, transdermal and oral pharmaceutical patches, LCD panels, multi-layer ceramic capacitors, lithium-ion batteries and more.

=== Research applications ===
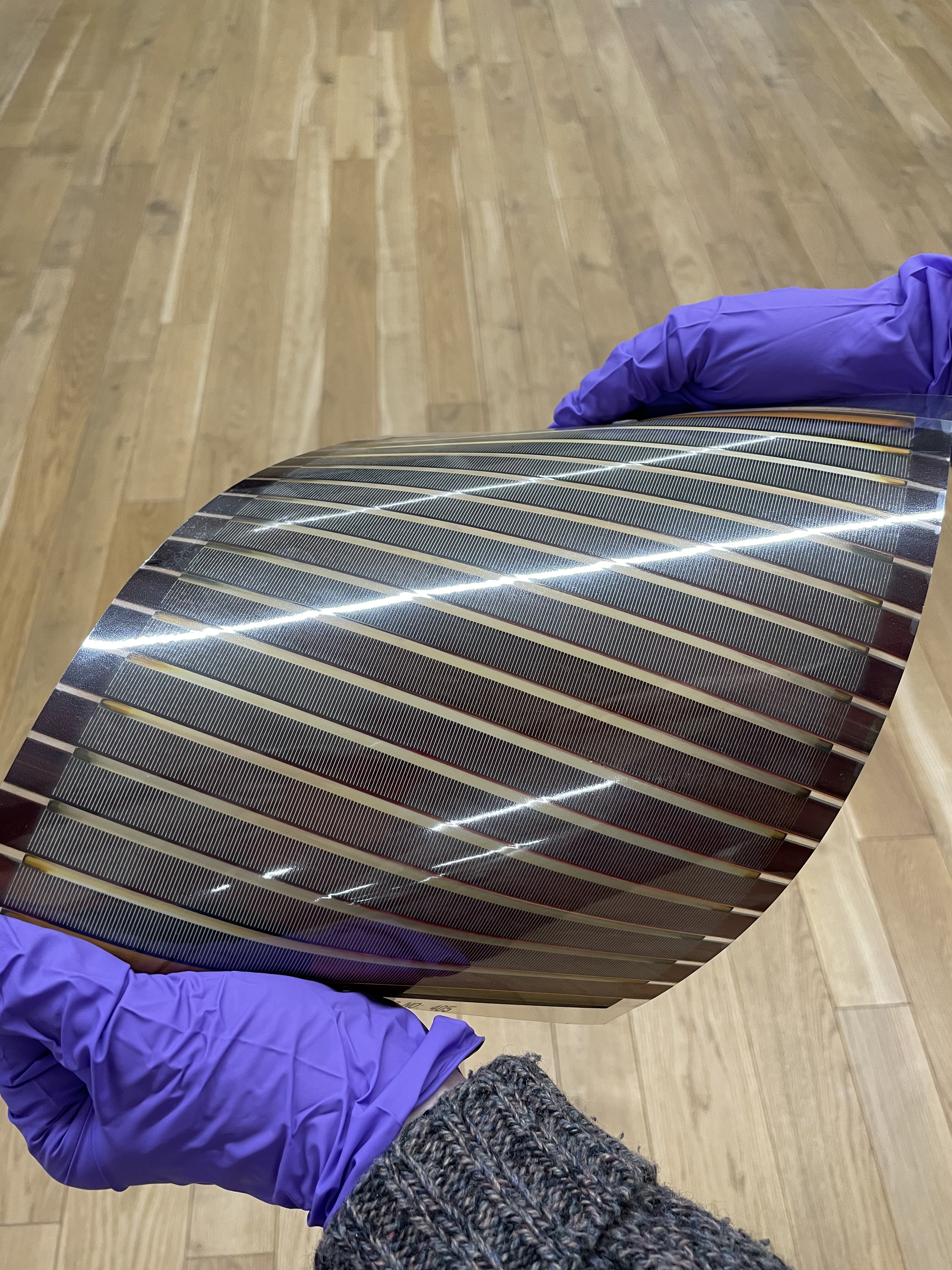
A photograph of a flexible organic solar cell produced via slot-die coating.

With growing interest in the potential of nanomaterials and functional thin film devices, slot-die coating has become increasingly applied in the sphere of materials research. This is primarily attributed to the flexibility, predictability and high repeatability of the process, as well as its scalability and origin as a proven industrial technique. Slot-die coating has been most notably employed in research related to flexible, printed, and organic electronics, but remains relevant in any field where scalable thin film production is required.

Examples of research enabled by slot-die coating include:

- Thin film solar cells, to produce electron transport layers, hole transport layers, photoactive layers, and passivating layers in perovskite, organic, quantum dot and multi-junction photovoltaic devices
- Solid state and next-gen batteries, to produce electrodes, solid electrolytes, ion selective membranes, protective coatings, and interface modification coatings
- Fuel cells and water electrolysis, to produce electrolytes and electrode catalyst coatings
- Flexible touch-sensitive surfaces, to produce transparent conductive films
- OLED devices, to produce electron transport layers, hole transport layers, and electroactive layers
- Printed diagnostics and molecular sensors, to produce active layers and ion selective membranes
- Microfluidics and lab-on-a-chip devices, to produce hydrophobic/hydrophilic surface coatings for enhanced liquid flow
- Water purification, to produce nanofiltration membranes
- Biobased and biodegradable packaging, to produce multilayer barrier foils from sustainable materials
