= Hot melt coating =

Method of applying coatings

Hot melt coating is the application of a layer to a substrate by pre-melting the desired material and then allowing or forcing the material to cool, solidifying the layer. The process is widely used in industry, including pressure-sensitive adhesives, labels, pharmaceuticals, etc.

== Introduction ==
Coating is the application of a layer to a substrate. In general, in order for a thin uniform layer to be applied, the application must be done at low or moderate viscosities. In many cases this low viscosity is achieved by dissolving or dispersing the desired coating in a liquid such as water or a solvent, but this then necessitates the subsequent removal of the liquid by, for instance, a drying process. Hot-melt coating achieves this low to moderate viscosity by melting the desired material before applying it to the substrate. The substrate and coated layer are then cooled, generally by passing over a chilled roller. There is no liquid to remove, so the process is, in principle, much faster than water- or solvent-based equivalents.

== Terminology & use ==
The process has been used so extensively for the application of adhesive layers by slot-die coating that the use of the term ‘hot melt’ often implies slot-die coating, but hot melt methods have also been used for other coating processes, such as metering rod or roller coating.

== Transfer coating ==
If the desired substrate is too temperature-sensitive to allow direct hot-melt coating, the product may be made by coating a transfer belt which is then brought into contact with the substrate after cooling: if the relative adhesion is correct then the coating will transfer to the new substrate from the transfer belt.

== See also ==
- Coating
- Hot-melt adhesive
- Pressure-sensitive adhesive
