= Reverse roll coating =

Reverse roll coating is a roll-to-roll coating method for wet coatings. It is distinguished from other roll coating methods by having two reverse-running nips. The metering roll and the applicator roll contra-rotate, with an accurate gap between them.

The surface of the applicator roll is loaded with an excess of coating prior to the metering nip, so its surface emerges from the metering nip with a precise thickness of coating equal to the gap. At the application nip, the applicator roll transfers all of this coating to the substrate, by running in the opposite direction to the movement of the substrate, wiping the coating onto the substrate.

== Machines ==
Reverse roll coating machines demand high specifications in their construction, e.g. for the machining and bearings of the rollers and for highly uniform speed control. This makes them relatively expensive compared to other coating technologies. Unlike many other coating methods, they can however handle coatings with a very wide range of viscosities, from 1 to more than 50000 mPas, and are capable of producing extremely polished finishes on the coatings they apply. They have been produced in a variety of 3-roll and 4-roll configurations.

== Products ==
Products that have been manufactured on reverse roll coating machines include magnetic tapes; coated papers; and pressure sensitive tapes. The rise of slot-die coating has tended to eclipse reverse roll coaters as in most if not all cases, the same products can be made on cheaper machinery.

== See also ==
- Anti-graffiti coating
