= Optically active additive =

Organic or inorganic material

Optically active additive (OAA) is an organic or inorganic material which, when added to a coating, makes that coating react to ultraviolet light. This effect enables quick, non-invasive inspection of very large coated areas during the application process allowing the coating inspector to identify and concentrate on defective areas, thus reducing inspection time while assuring the probability of good application and coverage. It works by highlighting holidays and pin-holes, areas of over and under application as well as giving the opportunity for crack detection and identification of early coating deterioration through life. The use of optically active additives or fluorescing additives is specified in US Military Specification MIL-SPEC-23236C. The use of OAAs and the inspection technique is described in the SSPC document Technology Up-date 11.

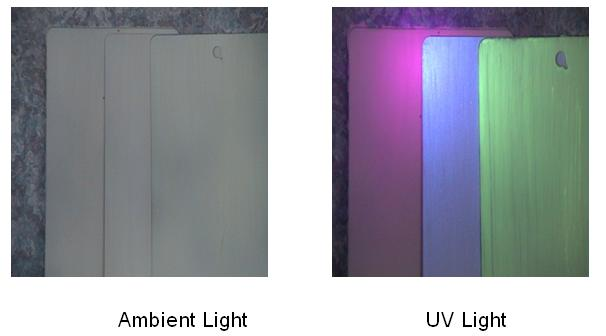
Panels with OAA under ambient and UV light

== Inorganic versus organic ==
There are two common types of optically active additives available commercially: inorganic and organic. Inorganic OAAs exhibit large particle sizes of 5–10 μm (no mobility), are light-stable, can have a choice of colours as shown in image above, are useful in a wide range of coating systems, and are more expensive. Some inorganic OAAs can exhibit some degree of afterglow aiding inspection.

Organic OAAs require low addition levels, are soluble in solvents and organic liquids (mobile), are blue under UV (emitting the same colour as lint, oil, grease etc.), can fade quickly, have limited use in a range of coating systems and are less expensive. They are also indistinguishable from old tar epoxy-type coatings still seen on some structures and vessels. Organic OAAs have no afterglow.

== Physics of optically active technology ==
If a single photon approaches an atom which is receptive to it, the photon can be absorbed by the atom in a manner very similar to a radio wave being picked up by an aerial. At the moment of absorption the photon ceases to exist and the total energy contained within the atom increases. This increase in energy is usually described symbolically by saying that one of the outermost electrons "jumps" to a "higher orbit". This new atomic configuration is unstable and the tendency is for the electron to fall back to its lower orbit or energy level, emitting a new photon as it goes. The entire process may take no more than 10^{−9} seconds. The result is much the same as with reflective colour, but because of the process of absorption and emission, the substance emits a glow. According to Planck, the energy of each photon is given by multiplying its frequency by a constant (the Planck constant, 6.626×10^{−34} J⋅Hz^{−1}). It follows that the wavelength of a photon emitted from a luminescent system is directly related to the difference between the energy of the two atomic levels involved.

In terms of wavelength, this relationship is an inverse one so that if an emitted photon is to be of short wavelength (high energy), the gap to be jumped by the electron must be a large one. The numerical relationship between these two aspects is the reciprocal of the Planck constant. Chemical engineers are able to devise molecules with these energy levels in mind, so as to adjust the wavelength of the emitted photons to produce a specific colour.

== Sources ==
- Buckhurst and Bowry. "An optically-active coating system for coating ballast tanks". Paper T-44, presented at the Paint and Coatings Expo 2005, SSPC, Pittsburgh, 2005
- Department of Defense Single Stocking Point for Specifications and Standards (DoDSSP), Standardisation Document Order Desk, 700 Robbins Avenue, Bldg 4D, Philadelphia, PA 19111–5094
- Technology Update 11 – Inspection of Fluorescent Coating Systems, SSPC, Pittsburgh October 2006
- Planck, M. "On the law of distribution of energy in the normal spectrum", Annalen der Physik, 4, 553, 1901
- Paint&Coatings.com; 28 November 2000. "Scottish company develops additive to revolutionize coating inspection process"
