= Cross section (electronics) =

Common sample preparation technique in electronics

In electronics, a cross section, or microsection, is a prepared electronics sample that allows analysis at a plane that cuts through the sample. It is a destructive technique requiring that a portion of the sample be cut or ground away to expose the internal plane for analysis. They are commonly prepared for research, manufacturing quality assurance, supplier conformity, and failure analysis. Printed wiring boards (PWBs) and electronic components and their solder joints are common cross sectioned samples. The features of interest to be analyzed in cross section can be nanometer-scale metal and dielectric layers in semiconductors up to macroscopic features such as the amount of solder that has filled into a large, 0.125in (3.18mm) diameter plated-through hole.

== Preparation ==
Cross sections can be prepared by several methods typically chosen based on the scale of the feature of interest because the technique affects the smoothness of the final polish. Smoother polishes allow an analysis of smaller features but can also take longer or be more expensive to prepare. Cross-sectioning hard materials such as alumina might require a different technique than a soft material like gold or soft plastic.

=== Mechanical grinding and polishing ===
Mechanical grinding and polishing is a common method of preparation to analyze features on the order of 1s to 10s of microns to macroscopic features. Samples may first be cut down in size, for example, around a via in a PWB or around a ceramic capacitor soldered to a PWB. Samples may be prepared by encapsulation in a rigid material such as epoxy to keep the sample intact during grinding and with a vacuum step to fill in air gaps and create a solid sample with no voids. However, cross sections of some samples can be prepared with no encapsulation.

Encapsulated samples are prepared using a rough grinding medium to remove material from the sample until just before the plane of interest is reached. Equipment can help automate the process by holding grinding and polishing media firm and then spinning it so a sample can be pressed against it. Typical grinding media are silicon carbide and diamond, which can be in the form of disposable discs impregnated with the grinding medium or a slurry applied to a reusable pad. Successively finer media are used to finish grinding to the plane of interest and to polish at the plane of interest. Each successively smaller grit is used to remove the scratches and damage caused by the previous grit.

=== Mechanical cutting or milling ===
Some equipment allows for preparation of cross sections by direct cutting or milling.

=== Other techniques ===
Focused ion beam, ion beam milling, and cleaving are common techniques in the semiconductor fabrication industry.

== Printed wiring boards ==
Manufacturers of substrates used in electronics prepare cross sections of a final product for quality assurance. In cross section, the quality of drill holes can be assessed and the plating quality and thickness in vias can be measured. Voids in the substrate materials may be seen which show the quality of the lamination process.

== Electronic components ==
Viewing the internal structures of electronic components by cross section can reveal problems with manufacturing and material quality. In integrated circuits, a cross section can reveal the die, its active layers, the die paddle, and 1st level interconnect (wire bonds or solder bumps).

== Solder joints ==
Cross sections of component solder joints are commonly prepared to assess the quality and extent of the metallurgical bond. This analysis can be used to help determine any issues during the soldering processes that could lead to solder fatigue and failure. Solder joint cross sections are also commonly prepared during failure analysis to see cracks in the solder. Crack morphology can lead to identification of the type of stress and ultimately the root cause of the solder joint failure.

== Analysis techniques for cross sections ==
Analysis of polished cross sections can be performed with a variety of techniques. Images are commonly taken with optical microscopy and scanning electron microscopy. Chemical analysis can be done with energy-dispersive X-ray spectroscopy (EDS). Hardness testing can also be performed.
