= Electrostatic coating =

Electrostatic coating is a manufacturing process that employs charged particles to more efficiently paint a workpiece. Paint, in the form of either powdered particles or atomized liquid, is initially projected towards a conductive workpiece using normal spraying methods, and is then accelerated toward the work piece by a powerful electrostatic charge.

An addition to the electrostatic coating (or e-coating) process is dipping electrically conductive parts into a tank of paint that is then electrostatically charged. The ionic bond of the paint to the metal creates the paint coating, in which its thickness is directly proportional to the length of time the parts are left in the tank and the time the charge remains active. Once the parts are removed from the paint tank, they are rinsed off to remove any residual paint that is not ionically bonded, leaving a thin film of electrostatically bonded paint on the surface of the part.

== Process characteristics ==
- Uses a high voltage electrostatic charge which is applied to both the workpiece and the sprayer mechanism
- Uses 95% of sprayed paint due to reduced over-spray and better wrap-around
- Paint materials can be either powdered or liquid
- Process can be either automatic or manual
- Workpieces must be conductive
- Workpieces are usually baked after coated
- The baked on paint adheres extremely well and is difficult to remove without aggressive means of removal.

== Process ==
The workpiece travels down a conveyor belt towards a paint booth, or paint tank, where it is sprayed with, or dipped into, electrostatically charged paint particles. Integrated into a powder paint booth is a powder recovery unit, which recovers between 95% and 100% of the paint over-spray coatings. After the workpiece is coated, it continues on the conveyor belt to an oven, where the paint is cured. The benefits to the process of electrostatic coating are the ability to recover the little over-spray and having the process automated which will cut costs. The reason for the little overspray is the paint particles that do not hit the piece will turn in the air and go back to the piece. There are also some drawbacks to the process: everything in the area of the coating must be grounded to prevent static buildup and can easily arc, damaging the hanging devices and/or the locations where the hanging devices rest on the conveyor. All hangers, conveyors, etc. must be cleaned often to ensure a good ground and prevent anyone in the area from getting a severe shock. In an airborne system, any recesses on the piece that is being coated can be missed because the electrostatic paint is more attracted to corners and sharp edges; this means that another process for coating can be a better option if the piece has recesses. In the dipping process, air entrapment can occur in blind holes and deep recesses, so the positioning of the part as it enters the paint tank is critical in removing any trapped air that will restrict paint coverage.

== Workpiece geometry ==
The geometry of the workpiece is limited only by the size of the paint booth or tank. Using electrostatic coating, it is possible to apply paint in various thicknesses being limited only by the paint's tendency to run and therefore ruin the coating if applied in too thick a manner. It is usually preferred to apply many thin coats as opposed to one thick coat.

== Setup and equipment ==
The job may be delivered to the coating booth or hangers in any fashion, most commonly using either hands or pliers. After passing through the booth, or tank, and getting coated, the workpiece then either goes into a baking oven or out into the open air to allow the paint to cure on the part. In spray coating, many different spray nozzles may be used depending on the desired paint consistency and the shape of the workpiece.

== Typical tools and geometry produced ==
There are a wide variety of spray nozzles available for use in electrostatic coating. The type of nozzle used will largely depend on the shape of workpiece to be painted and the consistency of the paint.
