= Air knife =

Tool used on products on conveyor belts

An air knife is a tool used to blow off liquid or debris from products as they travel on conveyors. Air knives are normally used in manufacturing or as the first step in a recursive recycling process to separate lighter or smaller particles from other components for use in later or subsequent steps, post manufacturing parts drying and conveyor cleaning, part of component cleaning. The knife consists of a high-intensity, uniform sheet of laminar airflow sometimes known as streamline flow.

An industrial air knife is a pressurized air plenum containing a series of holes or continuous slots through which pressurized air exits in a laminar flow pattern. The exit air velocity then creates an impact air velocity onto the surface of whatever object the air is directed. This impact air velocity can range from a gentle breeze to greater than Mach 0.6 (40,000 ft/min) to alter the surface of a product without mechanical contact.

Air knives remove liquids, control the thickness of liquids, dry the liquid coatings, remove foreign particles, cool product surfaces or create a hold down force to assist in the mechanical bonding of materials to the surface. Electrical currents from anti-static bars can also be injected into the exit air knife stream to neutralize the static electricity charge on some surfaces.

In the majority of manufacturing applications for air knives, the air knives are stationary while the product passes through the air velocity air stream. In other circumstances, the product is stationary and the air knives move (reciprocate or rotate) over the surface of the stationary product. Although there are very few applications where an air knife can actually cut a product (break mechanical bonds between two points), air knives are often the most efficient method of removing or controlling unwanted or foreign substances on any surface. In reference to the galvanizing industry, air knives are used to precisely control the amount of zinc coating by wiping away the coating while it is still in a liquid state on the steel surface. In most hot dip applications both top and bottom coated surfaces can be independently controlled by computer via feedback loop as accurately as plus or minus 5 grams/meter squared. Most air knife systems for this application use heated nitrogen gas as the wiping agent, not atmospheric air. Nitrogen is used to reduce oxidation of the base metal.

== History ==
In the 1950s and 60s, the term "air doctor" was first used to refer to the non-contact method of debris blow-off using compressed air. The printing and textile industries were some of the largest users of air doctors at that time, named by analogy with "doctor rolls" and "doctor blades". They often needed wide paths of air from a compressed air system to control the thickness of liquids on a surface, or to blow debris off the surface of materials prior to the next process. Other terms used were air bar, air squeegee, air curtain, air jet, air blast, air blow off, air nozzle, air comb, air blade and air doctor blade. Today the most commonly used term is simply "air knife".

Although air knives powered by compressed plant air are used in a wide variety of industrial applications, industrial blower-powered air knives have proven to reduce the energy usage versus compressed air knives by 50–75% for most applications. Blower-powered air knife systems came of age with the advent of the 1987 Montreal Protocol, which started the clock on the worldwide phase-out of atmospheric ozone depleting CFC’s (chlorofluorocarbons) then used as cleaning agents in many industries.

Most of these solvent-based cleaning agents simply evaporated which required no blow-off or other drying methods. Although the printed circuit board industry was still in its infancy, it was among the first to initiate the conversion to aqueous and semi-aqueous-based parts cleaning systems.

With nearly every existing and all future circuit board factories using the new environmentally friendly cleaning technology, they also needed a new method of drying the p.c. boards following their water-based cleaning to remove solder fluxes and other contaminants. The trend away from other types of solvent-based parts cleaning to water-based cleaning for other industries began soon thereafter. Additionally, the conversion to water-based inks, paints, coatings, adhesives and other solutions used in various manufacturing sectors has resulted in the need for air knife dryers where none had previously existed. As a result of the Montreal Protocol and worldwide industry compliance with environmental stewardship mandates, the former niche business of air knives became an industry.

== Description of operation ==
Air knives on a production line commonly range from 0.25 to 200 inches (6.4 to 5,080.0 mm) in length with a discharge air slot or holes ranging from 0.001 to 0.25 in (0.025 to 6.350 mm). A stationary air knife configuration can require from one to a dozen air knives depending on the application criteria. Air is blasted through the air knife slots via an air generator, either an industrial blower or air compressor, to deliver the predetermined exit air volume and velocity needed.

There are many application, environmental, efficiency and duty cycle aspects to consider when choosing between compressors and blowers. Compressed air, which is least efficient when used for air knives discharging into free air, allows for use of primary plant air. The piping sizes supplying the air knives can be as little as 1/4 in (6.4 mm) diameter, so they are ideal for confined spaces. Blower-powered air knives must be larger in size along with larger diameter supply piping, but the efficiency improvement over compressed air is easily justified with the electrical power cost savings.

Air knife designs today have evolved to where some manufacturers produce a very efficient “teardrop” shape with a .95 coefficient of discharge. These blower-powered air knife designs typically have a profile of approximately 3.5 in (89 mm) wide x 5.5 in (140 mm) tall x any length, but the teardrop profile can range from 1.5 to 10 in (38 to 254 mm) tall depending on the criteria of the product for which the impact air velocity must be engineered. With construction ranging from 1/8 in (3.2 mm) thick aluminum extrusion to 11 gauge fabricated stainless steel, air knives can weigh 1 lb/ft to 25 lbs/ft. Depending on the width and speed of the product, the air knife can provide effective blow-off performance from 0.5 to 12 in (13 to 305 mm) or more away from the surface of the product. Round air nozzles of 1 to 4 in (25 to 102 mm) diameter can be effective against surfaces which are up to several feet (1 to 2 meters) from the product surface when engineered for such applications.

== Types and applications ==
The most common use of air knives is to contain or remove free-standing materials (liquids or solids) from the surface of material. The applications include drying bottles and cans after filling and rinsing, printed circuit boards following the conveyorized wash to remove solder paste and flux, metals castings after automatic machining and many more. They can also deliver heated or cooled air to a surface, or create an invisible air barrier to separate heated or cooled environments from one another in industrial applications such as continuous metal heat treating ovens, cold process or storage areas in food processing or dust containment for the entrance to clean rooms.

There is a variety of uses for air knives in many different industries, applications and environments. The invisible-high velocity air streams can be discharged by air knife designs of numerous shapes and sizes. These range from “garage built” devices with a low level of precision to the most exotic metals of construction used in air knives for class 100 clean rooms.

In instances where noise reduction and moisture containment around a conveyorized air knife installation becomes important, some manufacturing facilities have installed air knives within an enclosure. These enclosures keep water contained, reduce the amount of air knife noise and even eliminate any liquid that could create safety concerns.

== Basic design features ==
=== Compressed air-powered air knives ===
There has always been a wide assortment of blow-off appliances. Air knives and nozzles for compressed air blow-off range from home made round pipes with holes to engineered high pressure air knives. In order to achieve the highest efficiency using compressed air, many manufacturers of compressed air knives utilize the Coandă effect to improve compressed air knife design over other types of knives and nozzles. Although the efficiency of compressed air for low-pressure blow-off air is much lower than blowers, the Coanda-inspired air knives entrain ambient air into the high-velocity stream to enhance the blow off effect.

=== Blower-powered air knives ===
The teardrop-shaped air knife has a bulbous plenum which tapers down to a precise air discharge slot as the standard of the blower driven air knife industry. Whereas a round pipe with holes drilled has an average coefficient of discharge of 0.6 (60% efficient), the teardrop-shaped air knife is commonly 0.95 (95% efficient), which provides much higher-impact air velocity to the surface at which the air is directed with the lowest blower motor power demand. These teardrop designs are available in extruded aluminum shapes as well as fabricated carbon and stainless steels.
