= Ergonomics for manual material handling =

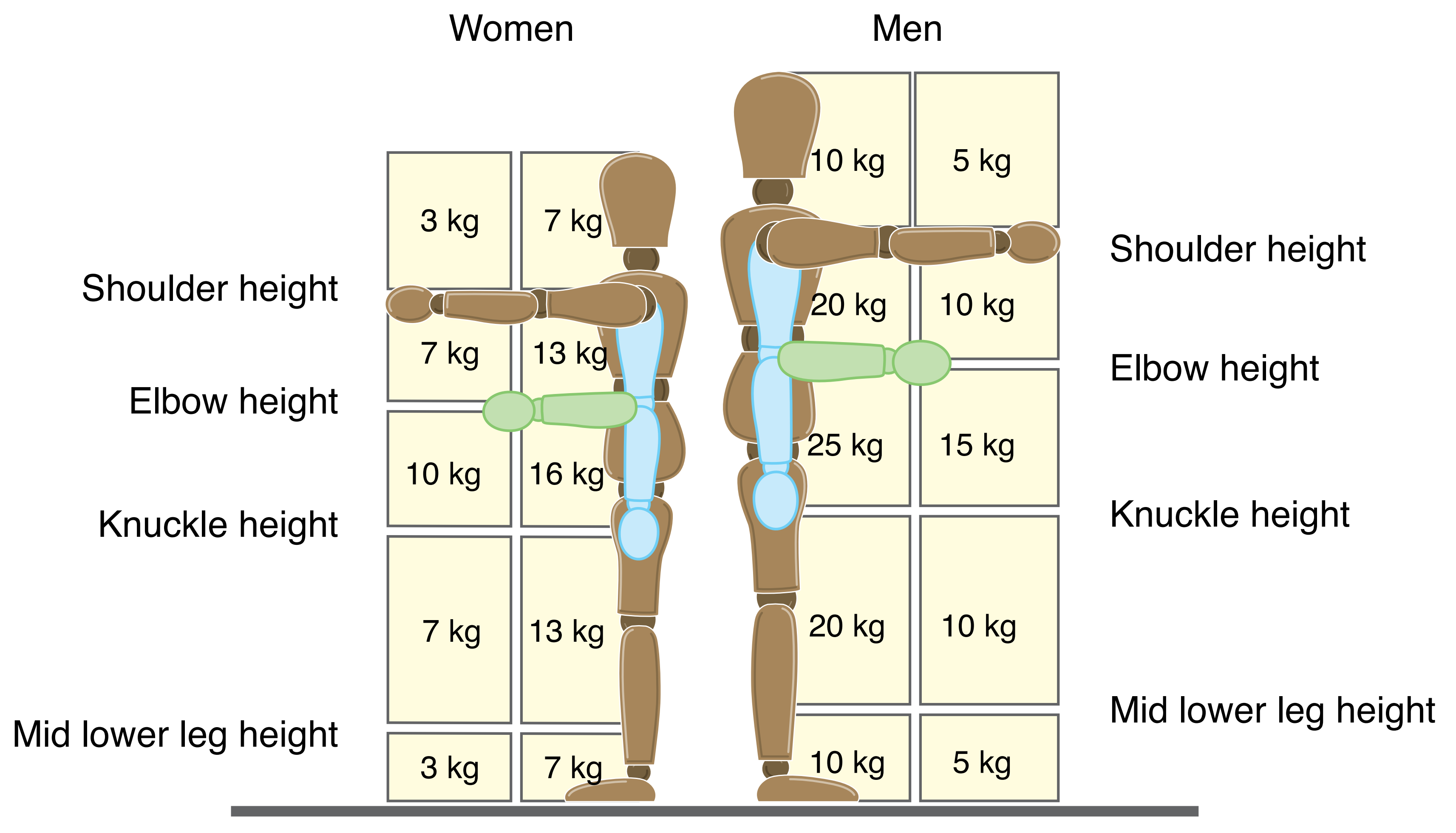
Pictogram of generally acceptable loads in different locations during manual handling when standing

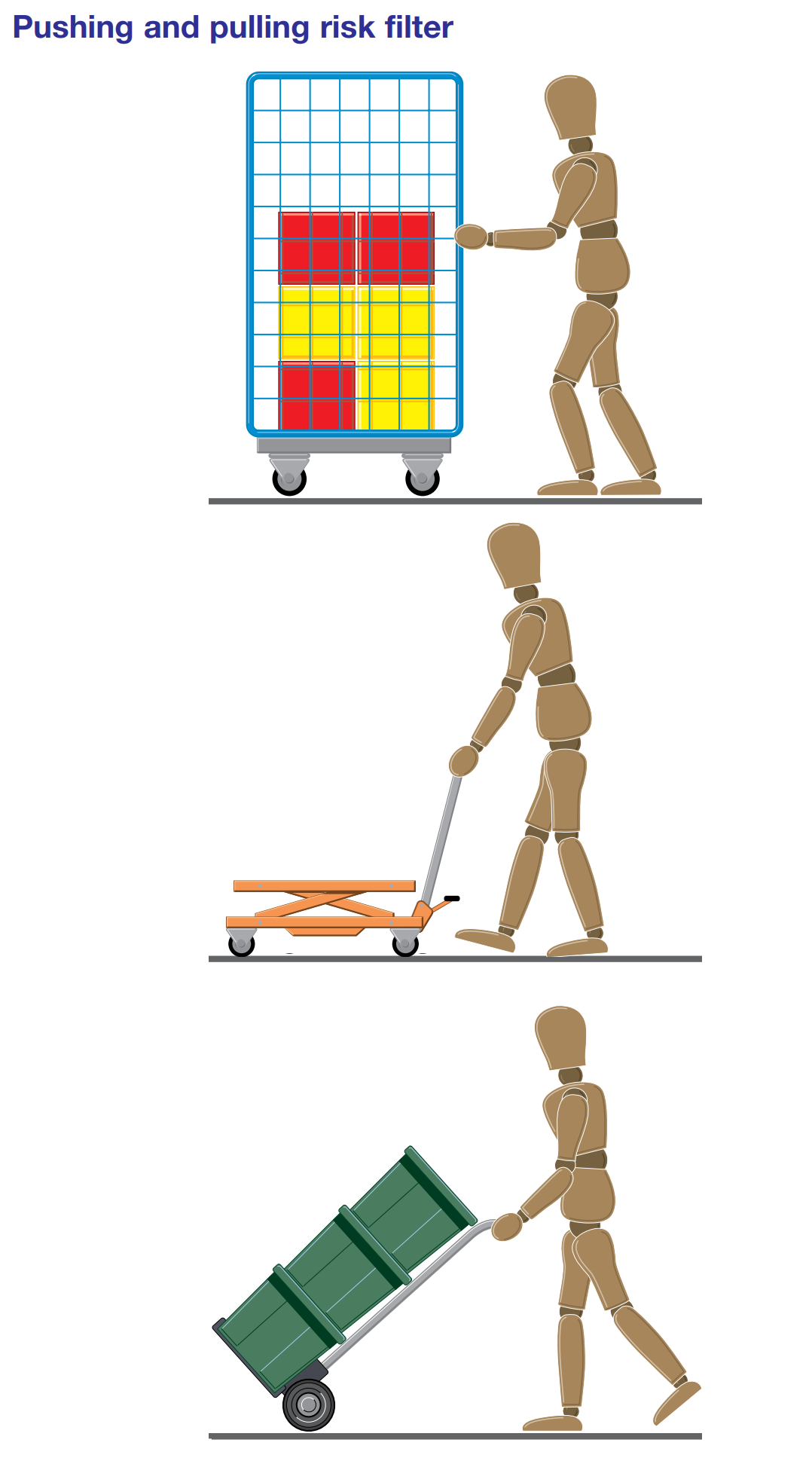
Pictogram of generally acceptable pushing and pulling postures

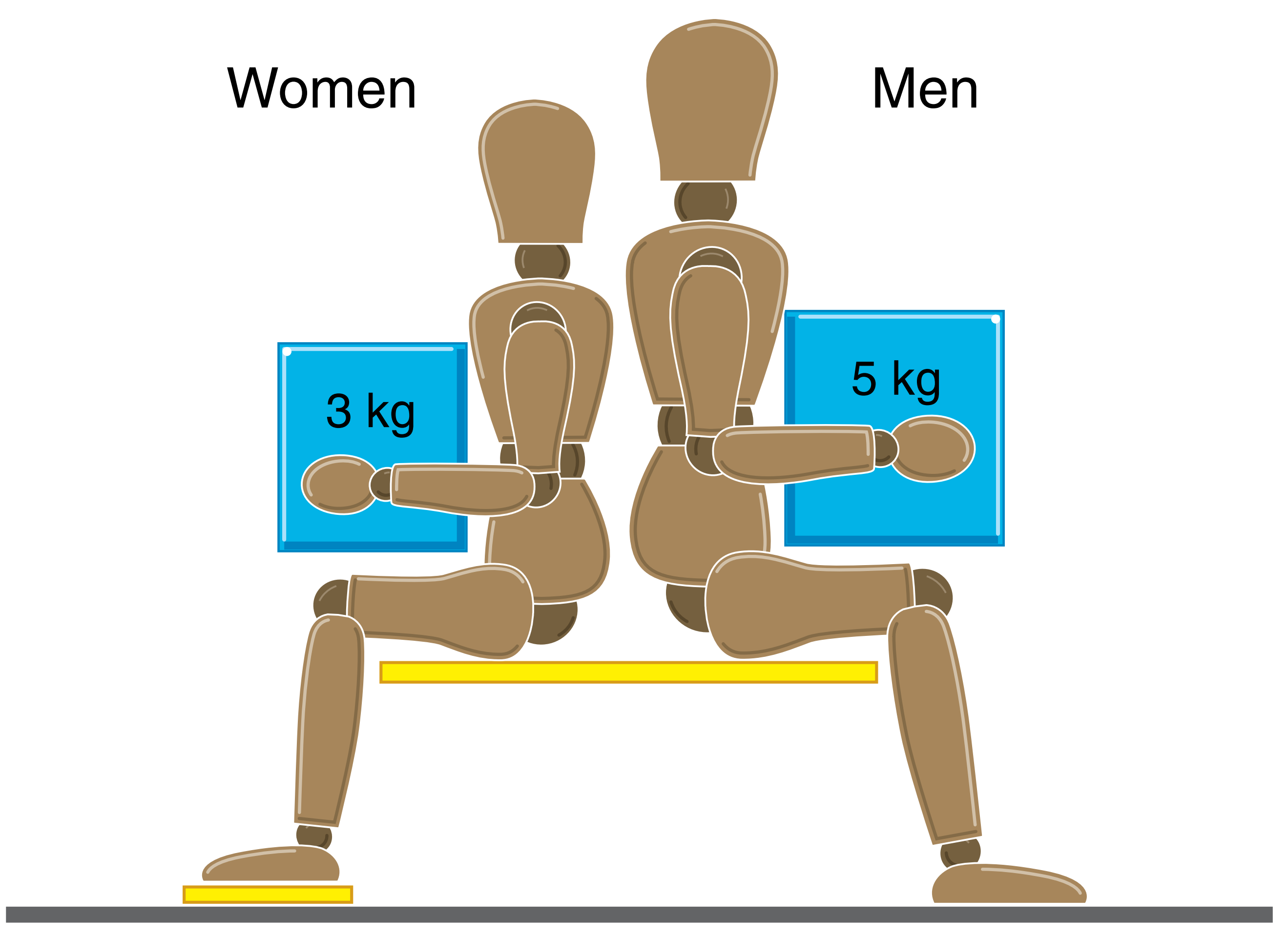
Pictogram of generally acceptable loads during manual handling when seated

Manual material handling work contributes to a large percentage of the over half a million cases of musculoskeletal disorders reported annually in the United States. Musculoskeletal disorders often involve strains and sprains to the lower back, shoulders, and upper limbs. They can result in protracted pain, disability, medical treatment, and financial stress for those afflicted with them, and employers often find themselves paying the bill, either directly or through workers' compensation insurance, at the same time they must cope with the loss of the full capacity of their workers.

Scientific evidence shows that effective ergonomic interventions can lower the physical demands of manual material handling work tasks, thereby lowering the incidence and severity of the musculoskeletal injuries they can cause. Their potential for reducing injury related costs alone make ergonomic interventions a useful tool for improving a company's productivity, product quality, and overall business competitiveness. But very often productivity gets an additional and solid shot in the arm when managers and workers take a fresh look at how best to use energy, equipment, and exertion to get the job done in the most efficient, effective, and effortless way possible. Planning that applies these principles can result in big wins for all concerned.

== Improving manual material handling in a workplace ==
According to the U.S. Department of Labor, handling is defined as: Seizing, holding, grasping, turning, or otherwise working with the hand or hands. Fingers are involved only to the extent that they are an extension of the hand, such as to turn a switch or to shift automobile gears.

Manual handling of containers may expose workers to physical conditions (e.g., force, awkward postures, and repetitive motions) that can lead to injuries, wasted energy, and wasted time. To avoid these problems, your organization can directly benefit from improving the fit between the demands of work tasks and the capabilities of your workers. Remember that workers' abilities to perform work tasks may vary because of differences in age, physical condition, strength, gender, stature, and other factors. In short, changing your workplace by improving the fit can benefit your workplace by:

- Reducing or preventing injuries
- Reducing workers' efforts by decreasing forces in lifting, handling, pushing, and pulling materials
- Reducing risk factors for musculoskeletal disorders (e.g., awkward postures from reaching into containers)
- Increasing productivity, product and service quality, and worker morale
- Lowering costs by reducing or eliminating production bottlenecks, error rates or rejects, use of medical services because of musculoskeletal disorders, workers' compensation claims, excessive worker turnover, absenteeism, and retraining

Manual material handling tasks may expose workers to physical risk factors. If these tasks are performed repeatedly or over long periods of time, they can lead to fatigue and injury. The main risk factors, or conditions, associated with the development of injuries in manual material handling tasks include:

- Awkward postures (e.g., bending, twisting)
- Repetitive motions (e.g., frequent reaching, lifting, carrying)
- Forceful exertions (e.g., carrying or lifting heavy loads)
- Pressure points (e.g., grasping [or contact from] loads, leaning against parts or surfaces that are hard or have sharp edges)
- Static postures (e.g., maintaining fixed positions for a long time)

Repeated or continual exposure to one or more of these factors initially may lead to fatigue and discomfort. Over time, injury to the back, shoulders, hands, wrists, or other parts of the body may occur. Injuries may include damage to muscles, tendons, ligaments, nerves, and blood vessels. Injuries of this type are known as musculoskeletal disorders, or MSDs.

In addition, poor environmental conditions, such as extreme heat, cold, noise, and poor lighting, may increase workers' chances of developing other types of problems.

=== Types of ergonomic improvements ===
In general, ergonomic improvements are changes made to improve the fit between the demands of work tasks and the capabilities of your workers. There are usually many options for improving a particular manual handling task. It is up to you to make informed choices about which improvements will work best for particular tasks.

There are two types of ergonomic improvements:

- Engineering improvements
- Administrative improvements

==== Engineering improvements ====
These include rearranging, modifying, redesigning, providing or replacing tools, equipment, workstations, packaging, parts, processes, products, or materials (see "Improvement Options").

==== Administrative improvements ====
Observe how different workers perform the same tasks to get ideas for improving work practices or organizing the work. Then consider the following improvements:

- Alternate heavy tasks with light tasks.
- Provide variety in jobs to eliminate or reduce repetition (i.e., overuse of the same muscle groups).
- Adjust work schedules, work pace, or work practices.
- Provide recovery time (e.g., short rest breaks).
- Modify work practices so that workers perform work within their power zone (i.e., above the knees, below the shoulders, and close to the body).
- Rotate workers through jobs that use different muscles, body parts, or postures.

Administrative improvements, such as job rotation, can help reduce workers' exposures to risk factors by limiting the amount of time workers spend on "problem jobs." However, these measures may still expose workers to risk factors that can lead to injuries. For these reasons, the most effective way to eliminate "problem jobs" is to change them. This can be done by putting into place the appropriate engineering improvements and modifying work practices accordingly.

=== Training ===
Training alone is not an ergonomic improvement. Instead, it should be used together with any workplace changes made. Workers need training and hands-on practice with new tools, equipment, or work practices to make sure they have the skills necessary to work safely. Training is most effective when it is interactive and fully involves workers. Below are some suggestions for training based on adult learning principles:

- Provide hands-on practice when new tools, equipment, or procedures are introduced to the workforce.
- Use several types of visual aids (e.g., pictures, charts, videos) of actual tasks in your workplace.
- Hold small-group discussions and problem-solving sessions.
- Give workers ample opportunity for questions.

== Improvement options ==
- Use team lifting as a temporary measure until a more permanent improvement can be found. If possible, try to find a co-worker of similar height to help with the lift.
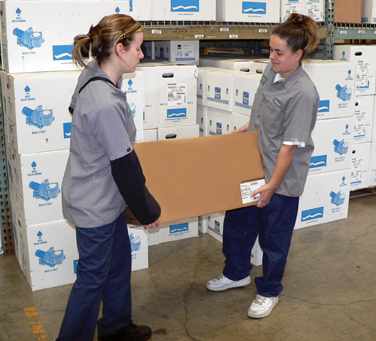
Team lifting

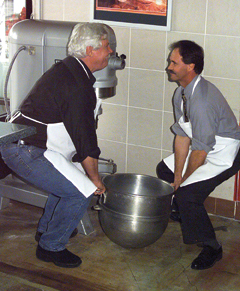
Team lifting
- Use a scissors lift, load lifter, or pneumatic lifter to raise or lower the load so that it is level with the work surface. Then slide the load instead of lifting.
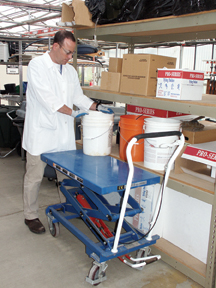
Scissors lift

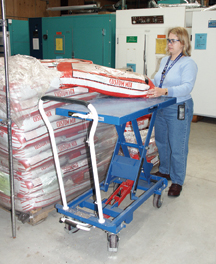
Scissors lift

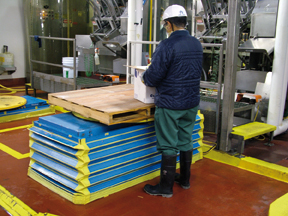
Pneumatic lifter (accordion skirting)

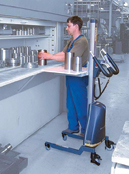
Lift table
- Use a turntable. Rotate the turntable to bring the container closer. Always work from the side closest to the load.
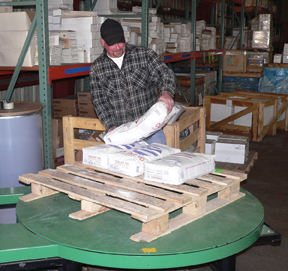
A fixed-height turntable for pallets with short low stacks.
- Use a tool.
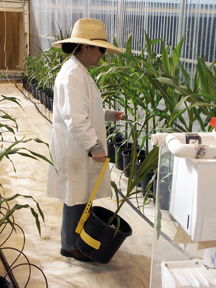
Pot lifter

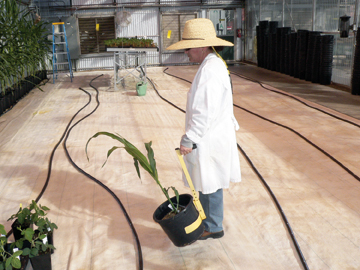
Pot lifter
- Raise the worker so that the container is grasped 30– 40 from the surface the worker is standing on.
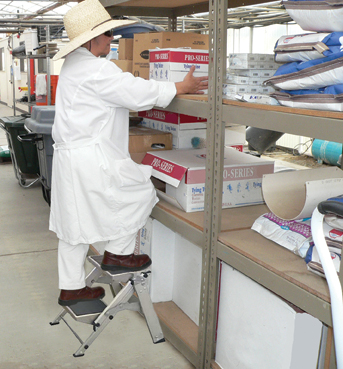
Use a step stool.

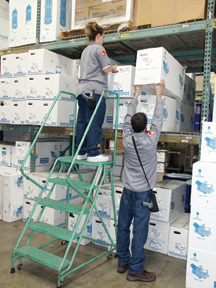
Use portable steps.

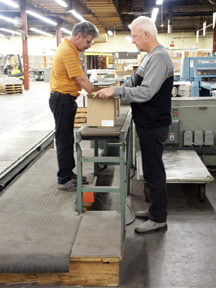
Use platforms.

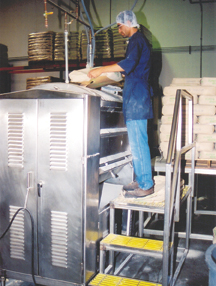
Use catwalks.

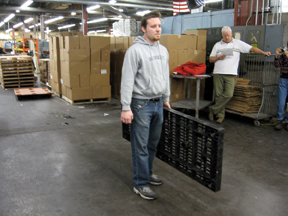
Use a portable work platform and adjust it to the height of the worker.

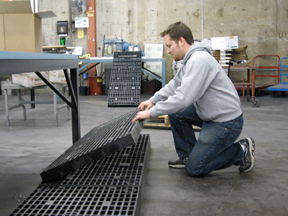
Use a portable work platform and adjust it to the height of the worker.

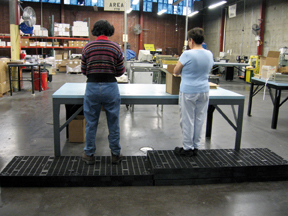
Use a portable work platform and adjust it to the height of the worker.
- Work within your power zone. Raise or lower the work surface.
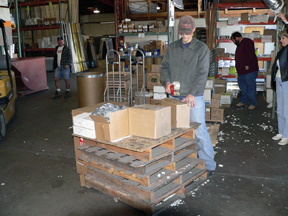
Stack pallets to create a higher work surface.

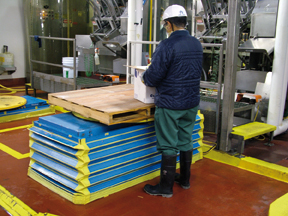
Use electric or pneumatic scissors lift (accordion skirting).

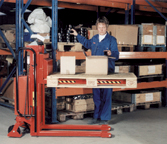
Use powered stackers.

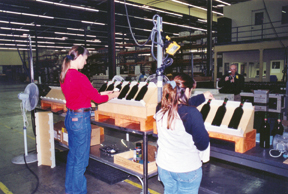
Provide variable-height work surfaces.

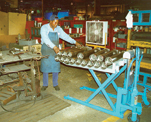
Use mobile scissors lifts.

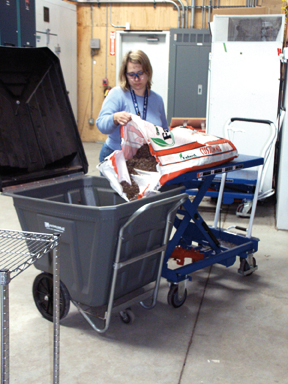
Use mobile scissors lifts.

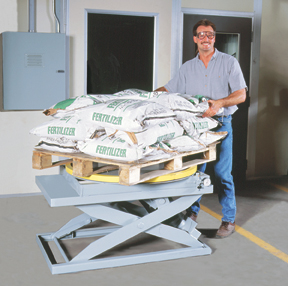
Use stationary scissors lifts.
- Store heavier or bulkier containers so that they can be handled within your power zone where you have the greatest strength and most comfort.
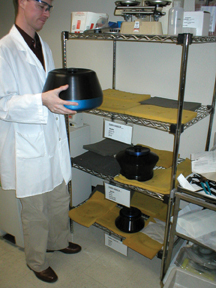
Store within power zone

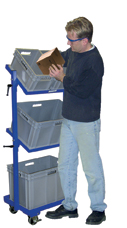
Store within power zone
- Work within your power zone. Tilt the container to improve handling of materials.
- Use angled shelving to improve access to containers.
- Hold the container close to the body when lifting and lowering.
- For easier access, remove or lower the sides of the receptacle.
- Add extra handles for better grip and control.
- Support the container on or against a fixed object, rack, or stand while pouring the contents.
- Use a removable plate or a work surface to support the container while pouring the contents into the receptacle.
- Use a screen over the opening to support the sack. Pour the contents through the screen.
- Use a cutout work surface so that you can get closer to the container.

=== NIOSH lifting equation ===
The National Institute of Occupational Safety and Health (NIOSH) lifting equation (1994) provides guidelines for evaluating two-handed manual lifting tasks. It defines a Recommended Weight Limit (RWL) as the weight of the load that nearly all healthy workers can lift over a substantial period of time (e.g., eight hours) without an increased risk of developing lower back pain. The maximum weight to be lifted with two hands, under ideal conditions, is 51 pounds. The RWL is based on six variables that reduce the maximum weight to be lifted to less than 51 pounds.

=== Easier ways to manually carry containers ===
The US National Institute of Occupational Safety and Health (NIOSH) published Ergonomic Guidelines for Manual Materials Handling in which it recommends ways to manually carry containers, as follows:

- Redesign the container so it has handles, grips, or handholds.
- Hold the container close to the body.
- Don't carry more than you can handle. To reduce the weight of the load, use a smaller container.
- Wear proper size gloves that fit. Gloves with rubber dots on the surface can increase grip stability on slippery surfaces.
- Increase the size of the bucket or pail handle with padding or a clamp-on handle.
- Get co-worker assistance when necessary. Discuss your plan so you don't have surprise movements.
- Pad the shoulder. Support the container on one shoulder and alternate between shoulders.
- Use a tool.

=== Alternatives to manual handling of individual containers ===
- Instead of lifting and pouring from the drum, insert a siphon or a pump
- Increase the size of the container or the weight of the load so that it is too large to handle manually
- Use a hook for light-weight containers to reduce your reach
- Use a drum dolly
- Use a cart or platform truck
- Use a portable scissors lift
- Use a hand truck
- Use a conveyor, slide, or chute
- Use a hand pallet truck
- Use a portable hoist or crane
- Use a stacker
- Use a powered hand truck
- Use an airball table
- Use a forklift
- Use a crane
- Use a pallet truck
- Use a lifter
- Use a carousel
- Use a tilter

== See also ==
- Occupational Safety and Health Administration
- National Institute for Occupational Safety and Health
- Manual handling of loads
- Material handling
- Material handling equipment
- College-Industry Council on Material Handling Education
- Caster

== Sources ==
- "Ergonomic guidelines for manual material handling" (PDF). Division of Occupational Safety and Health, California Department of Industrial Relations. 2007. doi:10.26616/nioshpub2007131.
