= Shoulder dolly =

Device to help with manual heavy lifting

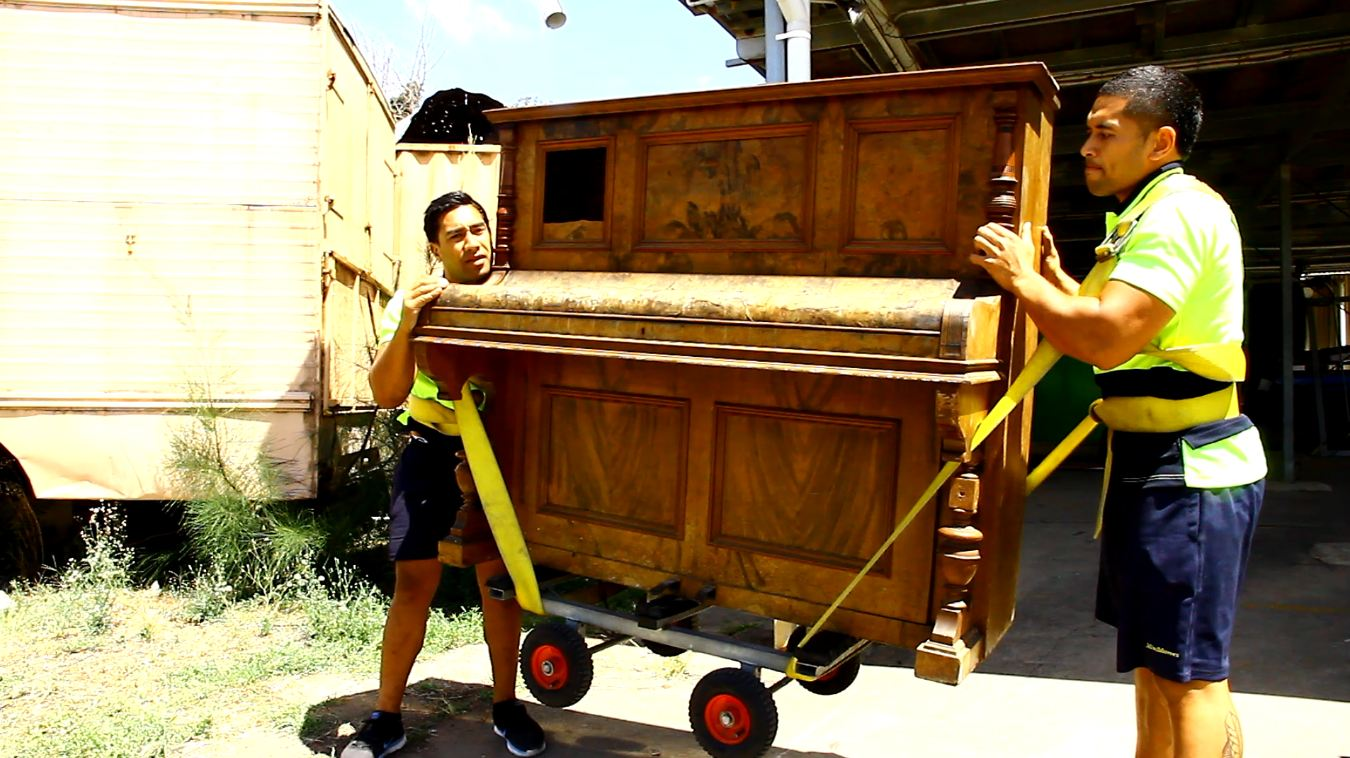
Moving personnel moving a piano using a trolley and carrying harnesses attached to hip belts.

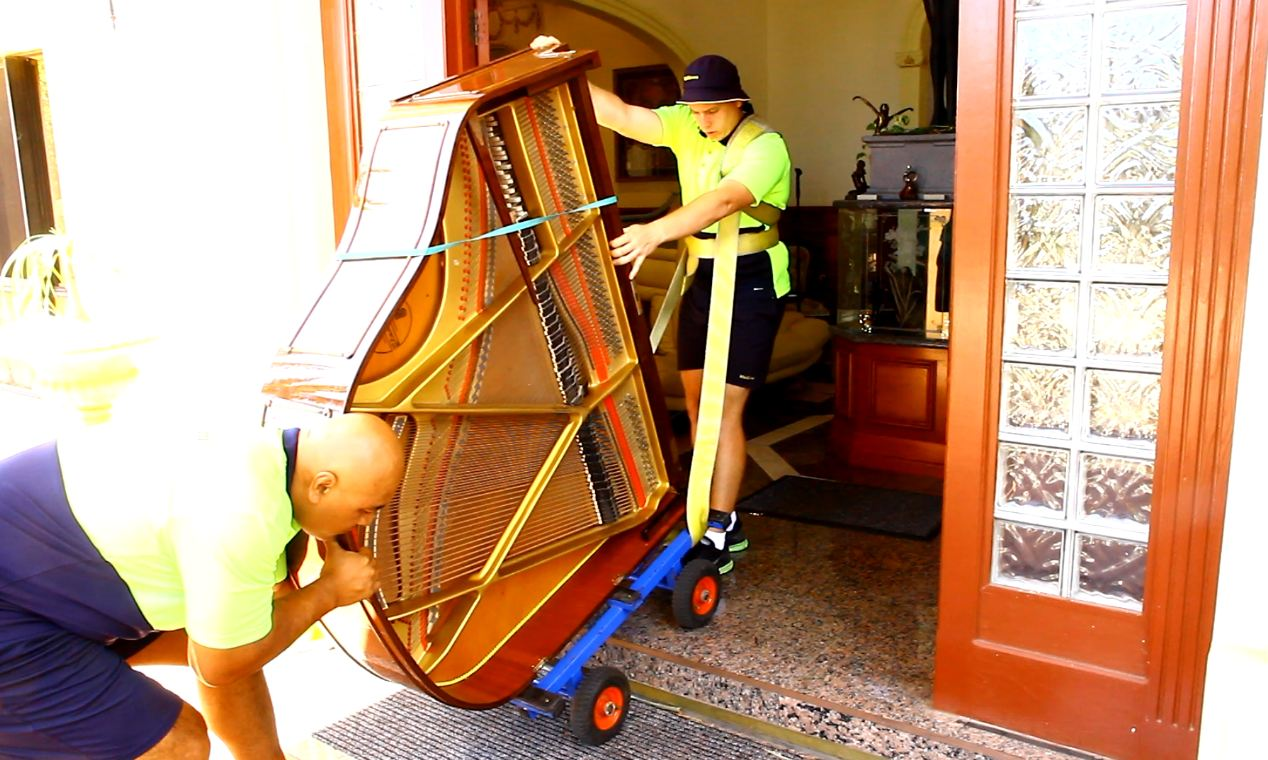
A trolley and carrying moving straps used to move a grand piano over a stair.

A shoulder dolly, also known as moving straps, lifting straps, furniture moving straps, and similar names, is a lifting strap and harness used in transport and logistics which allows moving personnel to distribute the load more evenly on the shoulders and hips so that heavy lifts can be performed with less risk of back injury. They are often used in pairs by two people carrying an object between them, and are sometimes used by moving companies. In 2019, a shoulder dolly made by a British manufacturer was named a finalist in Tomorrow’s Health & Safety Awards 2019, which is part of a digital magazine for the British health and safety industry.

A forearm lifting strap or forearm "forklift" strap is a somewhat similar device but places the weight on the forearm instead of the shoulder and hips.

== Mechanism ==
Shoulder dollies can promote proper lifting techniques by encouraging the use of legs for lifting, thereby reducing the risk of injury and back strain. They also help utilize the body's stronger muscle groups and give better leverage. According to one source, the leg muscles are less prone to getting tweaked and injured compared to the back due to the additional weight during a lift.

== Compared to wheeled moving ==
Compared to a trolley, a lifting strap can make it easier to move objects past uneven surfaces such as steps and stairs. Shoulder dollies are sometimes also used together with a wheeled trolley to pass varied terrain where it is possible to take advantage of benefits from both transportation methods when suited.

== Safety ==
Shoulder dollies can be a safety hazard if used incorrectly. They should not be used by persons with physical limitations or injuries. Safety boots may be recommended.

Shoulder dollies are often made of straps with padding at the points of contact with the body, and should preferably be sewn together in the back so that the straps do not easily slip to the side and off the shoulders during lifting. The sling is often attached to the object being carried via a lifting hook.

== See also ==
- Manual handling of loads
- Hand truck
