= Pallet jack =

Industrial machine

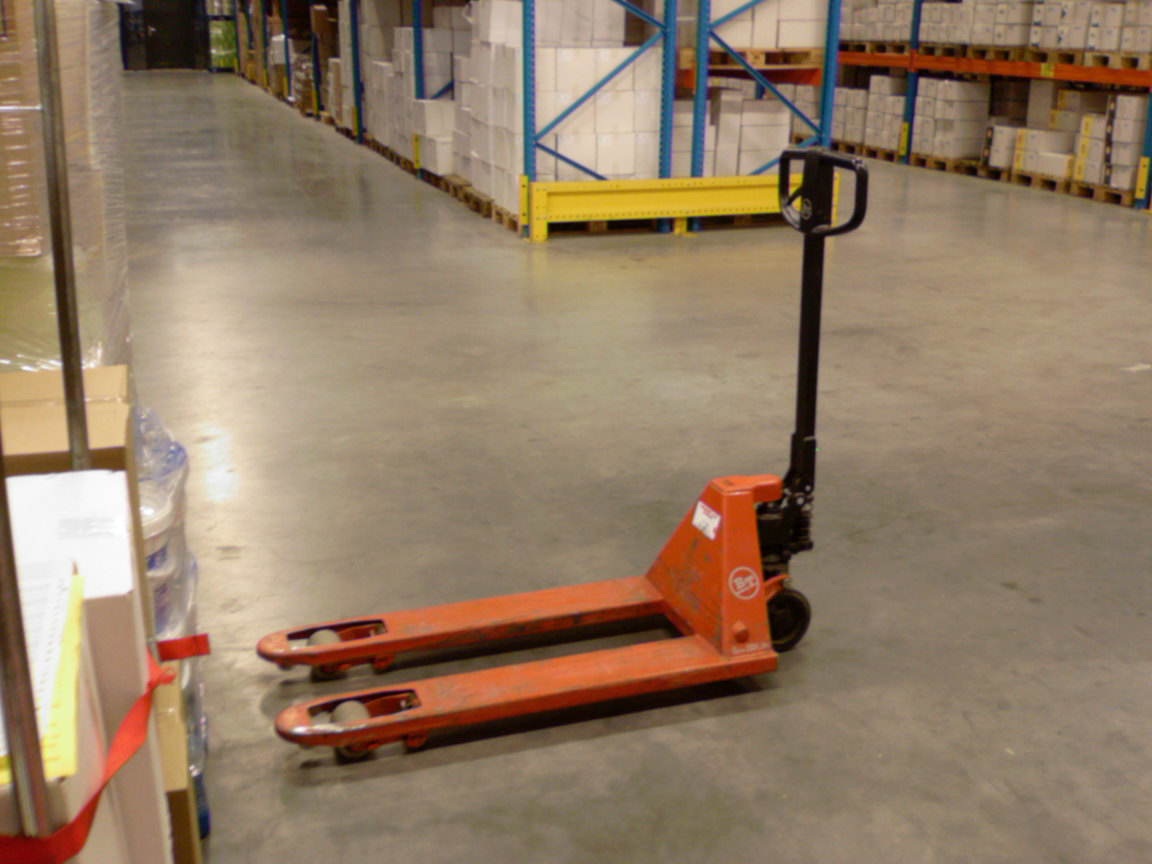
Typical manual pallet jack (lowered)

A pallet jack, also known as a pallet truck or pallet pump, is a tool used to lift and move pallets. Pallet jacks are the most basic form of a forklift and are intended to move palletized loads within warehouses, distribution centers, retail stores, and construction sites.

== Operational principle ==
The jack is steered by a tiller-like lever called a 'tow bar' that also acts on the pump piston for raising the forks. A small lever on the tow bar's steering handle releases the hydraulic fluid, causing the forks to lower. The steering wheels are located directly below the tow bar and support the jacking mechanism.

The front wheels inside the end of the forks are mounted on push rods attached to linkages that go to levers attached to the jack cylinder. As the hydraulic jack at the 'tiller' end is raised, the links force the wheels down, raising the forks vertically above the front wheels, raising the load upward until it clears the floor. The pallet is only lifted enough to clear the floor for subsequent travel. Oftentimes, pallet jacks are used to move and organize pallets inside a trailer, especially when there is no forklift truck access or availability.

Operating mechanism
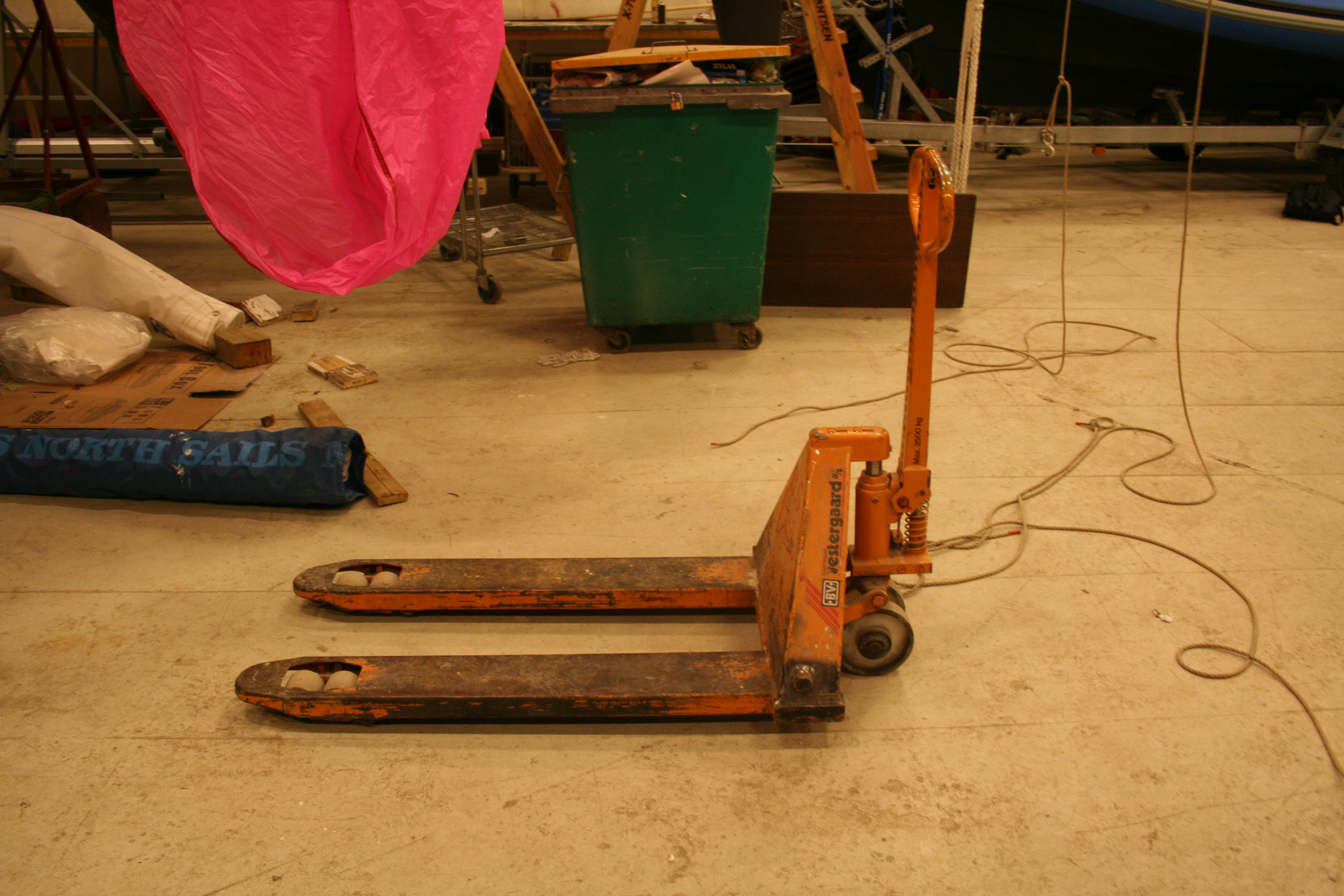
Pallet jack in lowered position, allowing it to be inserted under a load on a pallet

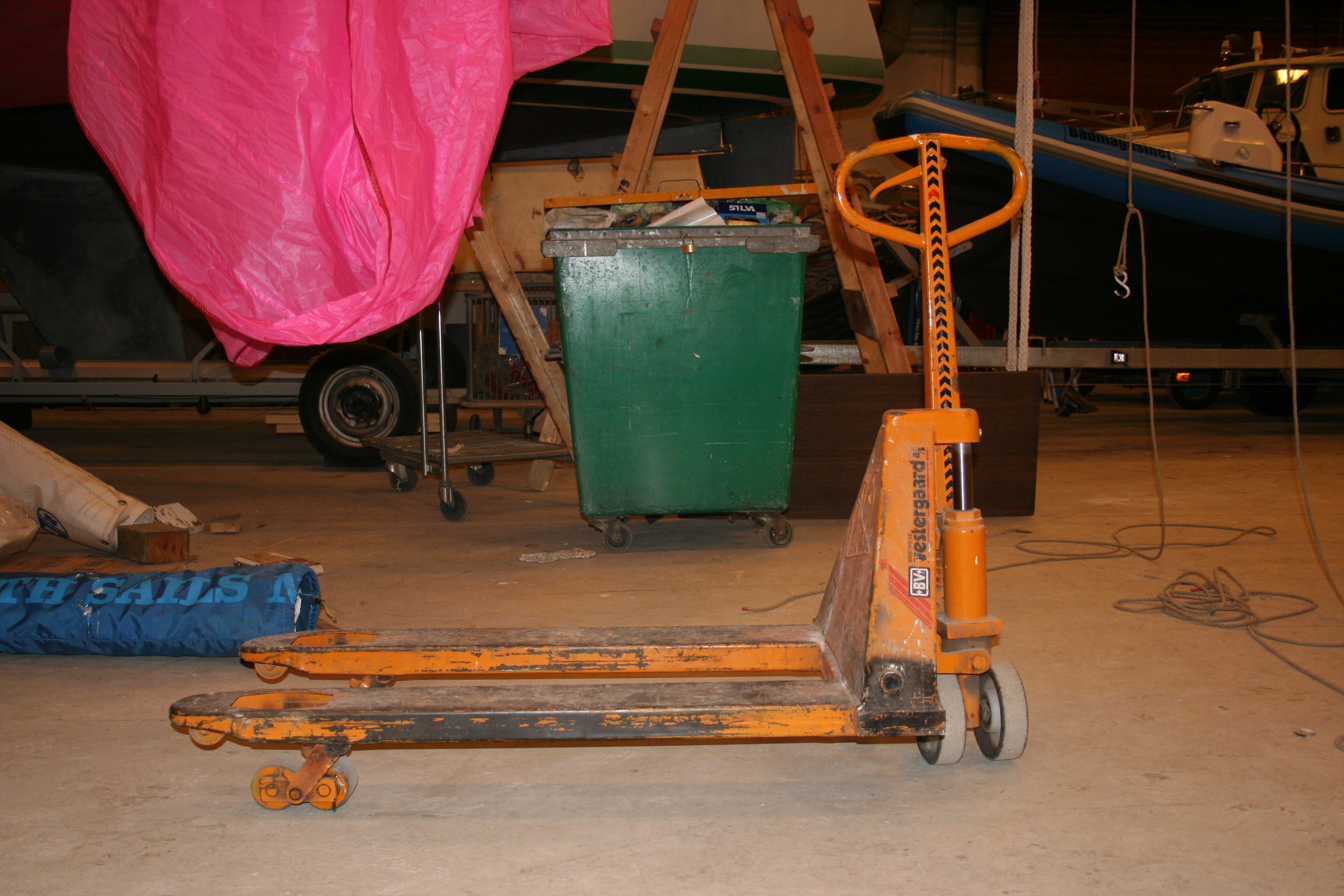
Jack showing how wheels drop, lifting forks and load. The steering tiller and raised hydraulic cylinder are clearly visible on the right

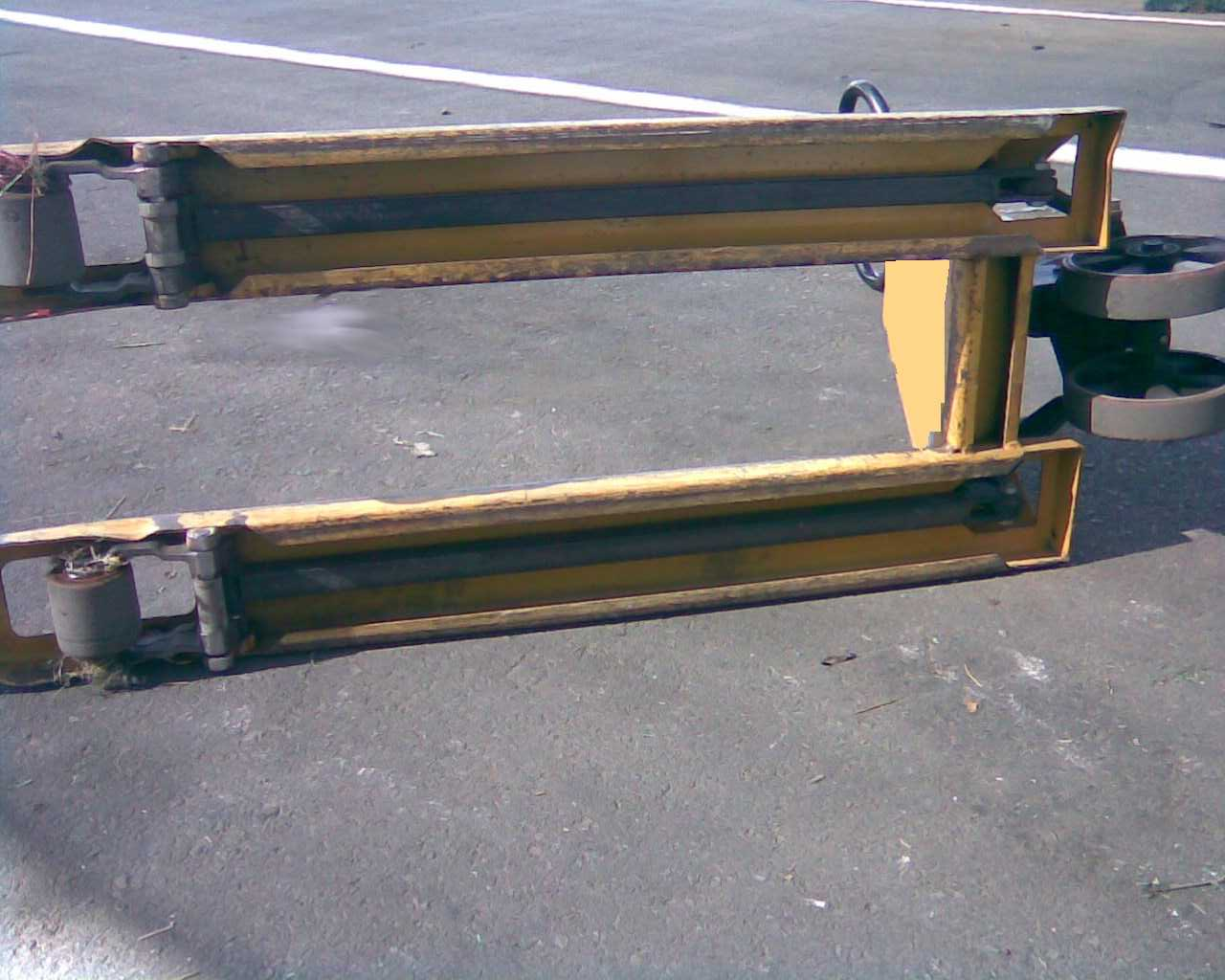
Underside of a jack showing linkages under forks

== History ==
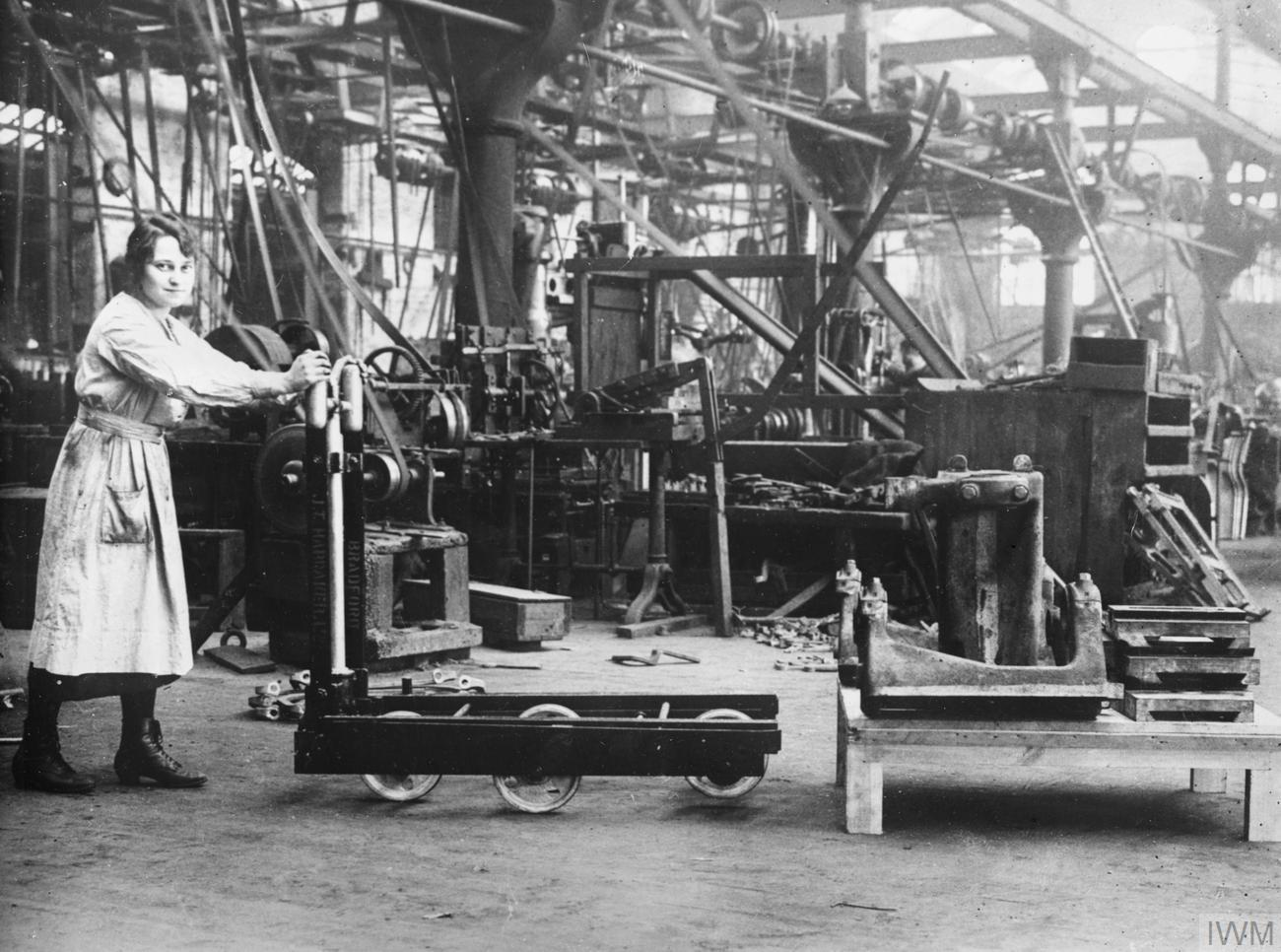
A worker at Bowling Iron Works, England, using an early pallet jack to lift a load weighing 10 long hundredweight (1,100 lb; 510 kg), 1918

Manual pallet jacks have existed since at least 1918, following the introduction of pallets. Early iterations used mechanical linkages and other rudimentary systems to lift the forks, whereas more modern pallet jacks use a hand-pumped hydraulic jack or electricity.

== Types ==
=== Manual pallet jack ===
A manual pallet jack is a hand-powered jack most commonly seen in retail and personal warehousing operations. They are used predominantly for lifting, lowering and steering pallets from one place to another.

=== Powered pallet jack ===
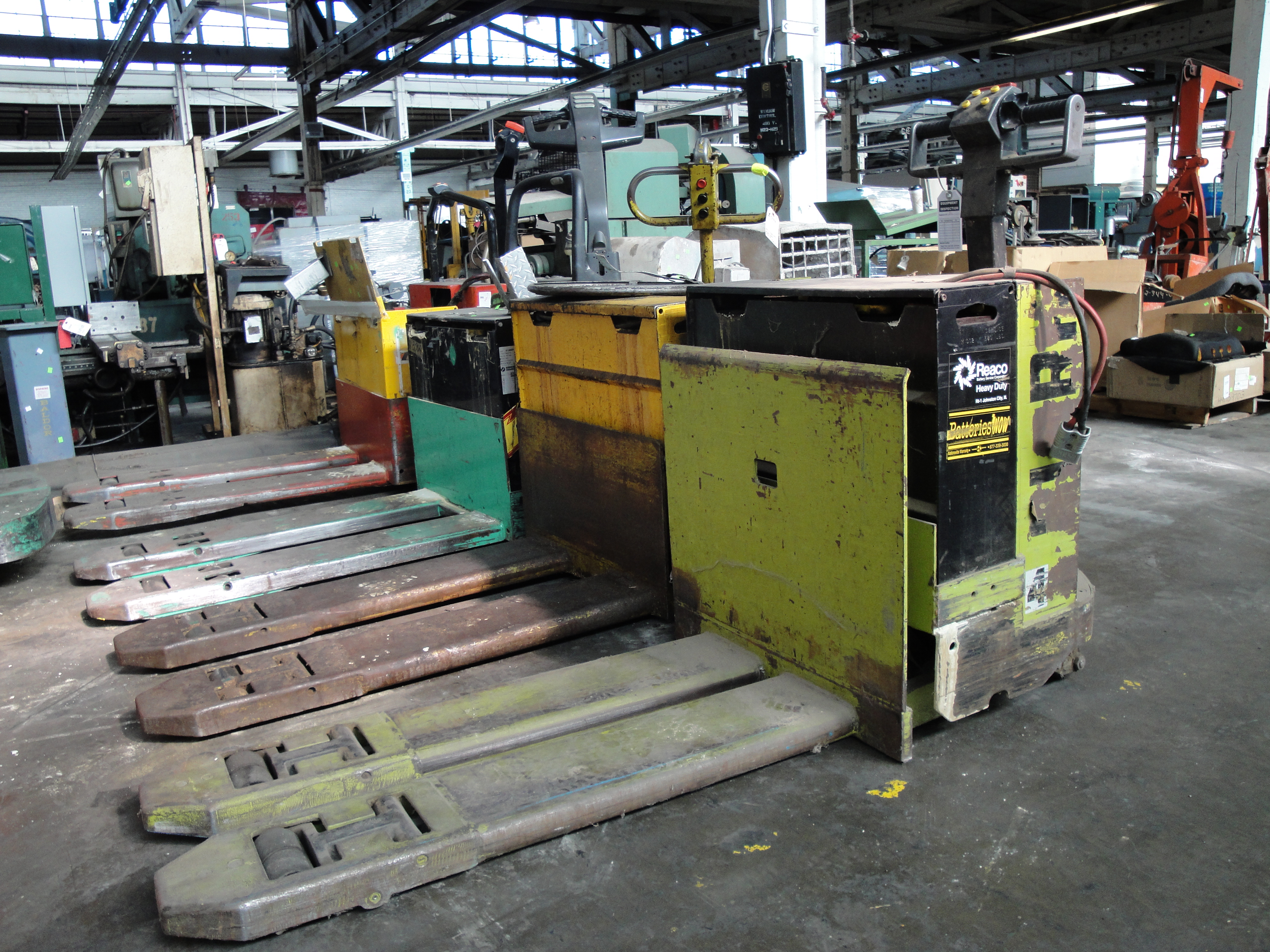
An electric pallet jack. The recharging lead can be seen.

Powered pallet jacks, also known as electric pallet trucks, walkies, single or double pallet jacks, or power jack, are motorized to allow lifting and moving of heavier and stacked pallets. Some contain a platform for the user to stand while moving pallets. The powered pallet jack is generally moved by a throttle on the handle to move forward or in reverse and steered by swinging the handle in the intended direction. Some contain a type of dead man's switch rather than a brake to stop the machine should the user need to stop quickly or leave the machine while it is in use. Others use a system known as "plugging" wherein the driver turns the throttle from forward to reverse (or vice versa) to slow and stop the machine, as the dead man's switch is used in emergencies only.

=== Rough terrain pallet jack ===
Rough terrain pallet jacks are designed specifically for use on uneven ground. They are made using heavy-duty frames and robust pneumatic tyres so that they can be manoeuvred over rough surfaces with ease. Many manufacturers opt for watertight wheel bearings, a hydraulic elevator or a built-in pump to ensure their rough terrain pallet jacks are easy and comfortable to use, even in the harshest conditions.

== Operational limitations ==
- Reversible pallets cannot be used.
- Double-faced non-reversible pallets cannot have deck-boards where the front wheels extend to the floor.
- Enables only two-way entry into a four-way notched-stringer pallet, because the forks cannot be inserted into the notches.
- Power jacks have difficulty in confined spaces (coolers) and narrow openings.

== Operational risks ==
Pallet jacks are classed as material-handling equipment (MHE). Under most health and safety law, training is required in their use (particularly for powered pallet jacks) and, as the loads carried are heavy, there is a substantial risk of accidents resulting in injuries.

== Typical dimensions ==
Industry seems to have 'standardized' pallet jacks in several ways.

- Width of each of two forks: 180 mm (7 in)
- Fork width, i.e. The dimension between the outer edges of the forks: Available as 510 and 690 mm (20 1/4 and 27 in)
- Fork length: Available as 910, 1,070 and 1,220 mm (36, 42 and 48 in)
- Lowered height: 74 mm (2.9 in)
- Raised height: At least 190 mm (7.5 in), but some will raise higher

In Eurasia the overall dimensions are similar, as modern container palletization has forced standardization in the dimensional domain globally.

== See also ==
- EUR-pallet
- Manual handling of loads
- Unit load
