= College-Industry Council on Material Handling Education =

Council of the Material Handling Industry

- Abbreviation: CICMHE
- Formation: 1952; 74 years ago
- Type: Non-profit Academic/industry council
- Legal status: Affiliate organization
- Location: Charlotte, North Carolina
- Region served: United States
- Parent organization: Material Handling Institute (MHI)
- Website: www.mhi.org/cicmhe/about

The College-Industry Council on Material Handling Education (CICMHE) is an US academic/industry council of the Material Handling Industry. It is an affiliate organization of the Material Handling Institute (MHI), a trade association that promotes increased awareness of material handling and logistics within the USA through a variety of educational and research activities. CICMHE was founded in 1952 and has served to connect practitioners with academics that teach and do research in material handling.

== History ==
Founded in 1952, the main body of the Council is composed of college and university educators with additional members from manufactures, distributors and users.

=== Notable members ===
Since 1952, there have been over 160 academic members. Notable alumni include distinguished faculty and university administrators:

- James Apple
- Ruddell Reed Jr.
- John White – former chancellor of the University of Arkansas
- Jim Tompkins - Founder & Chairman, Tompkins Ventures; Founder, Past Chairman, Past CEO, Tompkins International
- Richard (Dick) Ward
- Leon McGinnis – Professor Emeritus, Stewart School of Industrial and Systems Engineering, Georgia TEch
- Mickey Wilhelm – Dean Emeritus of J.B. Speed School of Engineering at the University of Louisville
- Robert Graves
- Ron Askin – former director of School of Computing, Informatics, and Decision Systems Engineering at Arizona State University
- Mikell Groover
- Brett Peters – current Dean of Engineering at University of Wisconsin-Milwaukee
- Russ Meller – member of the National Academy of Engineering for contributions to large-scale distribution center design and operation, current vice president, research and development, Fortna
- Andres Carrano – current dean of the Fairfield University School of Engineering

== Structure ==
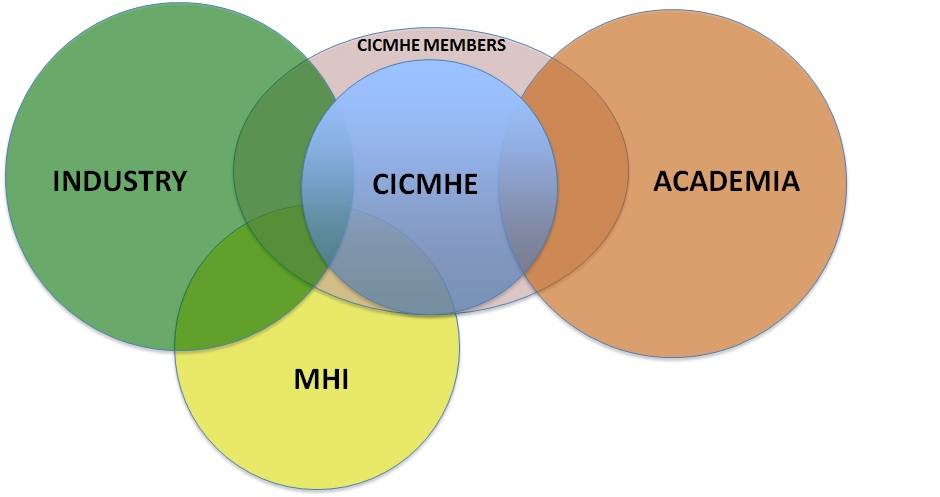
CICMHE membership structure.

The main body of the council is composed of fifteen college and university educators that are elected to a four-year term and is governed by a four-member executive committee. Additional members are drawn from material handling equipment manufacturers, distributors, users and consultants, representatives of the business press, and professional staff members of organizations concerned with material handling education. CICMHE is organized into two working committees:

- The Events Committee plans and executes structured events to facilitate learning and research, promote knowledge transfer, provide exposure to and awareness of the field, address current industry needs and trends, and strengthen the bridge between industry and academia.
- The Projects Committee initiate and conduct projects to transform and modernize existing educational offerings, create and maintain new educational offerings, assess usage and effectiveness of offerings, identify, incubate, and foster research in material handling and related domains; and leverage connections between CICMHE and councils, product sections, and affiliated trade associations.

== Activities ==
CICMHE sponsors the following major activities for students, teachers, and researchers:

=== Material Handling and Logistics Classroom Day ===
CICMHE has partnered with the Material Handling Equipment Distributors Association (MHEDA) to offer a special program for students and professors in engineering, technology, manufacturing, operations, supply chain and logistics at the MODEX and ProMat trade shows sponsored alternate years by MHI. Research has shown that "Classroom Day, as a targeted experiential learning event, increased student appreciation, knowledge, and interest in the field of material handling and logistics."

=== Material Handling Teachers Institute (MHTI) ===
CICMHE sponsors a Material Handling Teachers Institute every two years for current and future faculty members who engage in material handling education in four year colleges and universities. MHTI 2024 is being held on the campus of North Carolina State University, Raleigh, July 22-24, 2024. The Material Handling Teachers Institute has been held in the summer at the following locations:

- Auburn University (Auburn, 2026)
- North Carolina State University (Raleigh, 2024)
- University of Buffalo (New York, 2022)
- Texas State University (Texas, 2019)
- Oregon State University (Oregon, 2017)
- University of Wisconsin Madison (Wisconsin, 2015)
- Rochester Institute of Technology (New York, 2013)
- Auburn University (Alabama, 2011)
- University of Arkansas (Arkansas, 2009)
- Universite Laval (Quebec, Canada, 2005)
- University of Louisville (Kentucky, 2003)
- Lehigh University (Pennsylvania, 1999)
- Michigan Tech University (Michigan, 1997)
- Montana State University (Montana, 1995)
- Rensselaer Polytechnic Institute (New York, 1993)
- New Jersey Institute of Technology (New Jersey, 1991)
- Auburn University (Alabama, 1983)

=== International Material Handling Research Colloquium (IMHRC) ===
Since 1990, CICMHE has sponsored an International Material Handling Research Colloquium that provides a forum for academic researchers to both present their work and to interact with leading companies within the industry. The research presented at each Colloquium is documented as a volume in the series Progress in Material Handling Research. IMHRC 2023 will be held in Dresden, Germany, June 21-23, 2023. Like the Material Handling Teachers Institute, the IMHRC Colloquium has been conducted every two-year cycle, with the Colloquium being offered in the summer, alternating between locations in Europe and North America:

- Trondheim, Norway (2025)
- Dresden, Germany (2023)
- Savannah, Georgia (2018)
- Karlsruhe, Germany (2016)
- Cincinnati, Ohio (2014)
- Gardanne, France (2012)
- Milwaukee, Wisconsin (2010)
- Dortmund, Germany (2008)
- Salt Lake City, Utah (2006)
- Graz, Austria (2004)
- Portland, Maine (2002)
- York, Pennsylvania (2000)
- Chandler, Arizona (1998)
- S'Hertogenbosh, Netherlands (1996)
- Grand Rapids, Michigan (1994)
- Milwaukee, Wisconsin (1992)
- Hebron, Kentucky (1990)

=== Student Design Competition ===
From 1994 through 2018, CICMHE co-sponsored, along with the Order Fulfillment Solutions (OFS) council of MHI, a team design competition for students interested in the design and analysis of material handling systems. Cash prizes of $2000, $1500, and $1000 were awarded to the first, second, and third place teams, plus $500 for each placing department.

== See also ==
- Material handling
- Material handling equipment
