= Material handling =

Sub-discipline of mechanical engineering

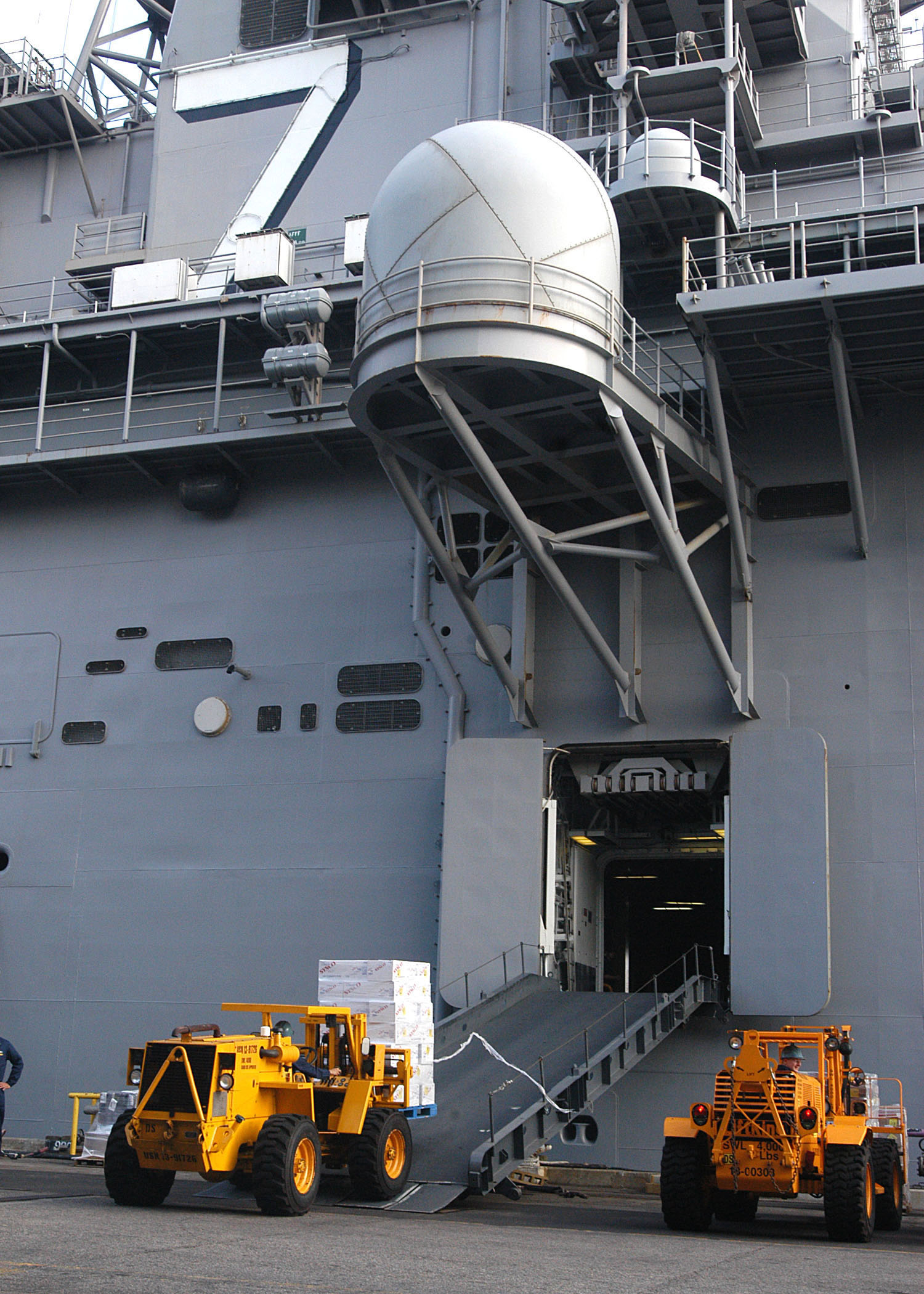
Lift trucks provisioning a navy ship

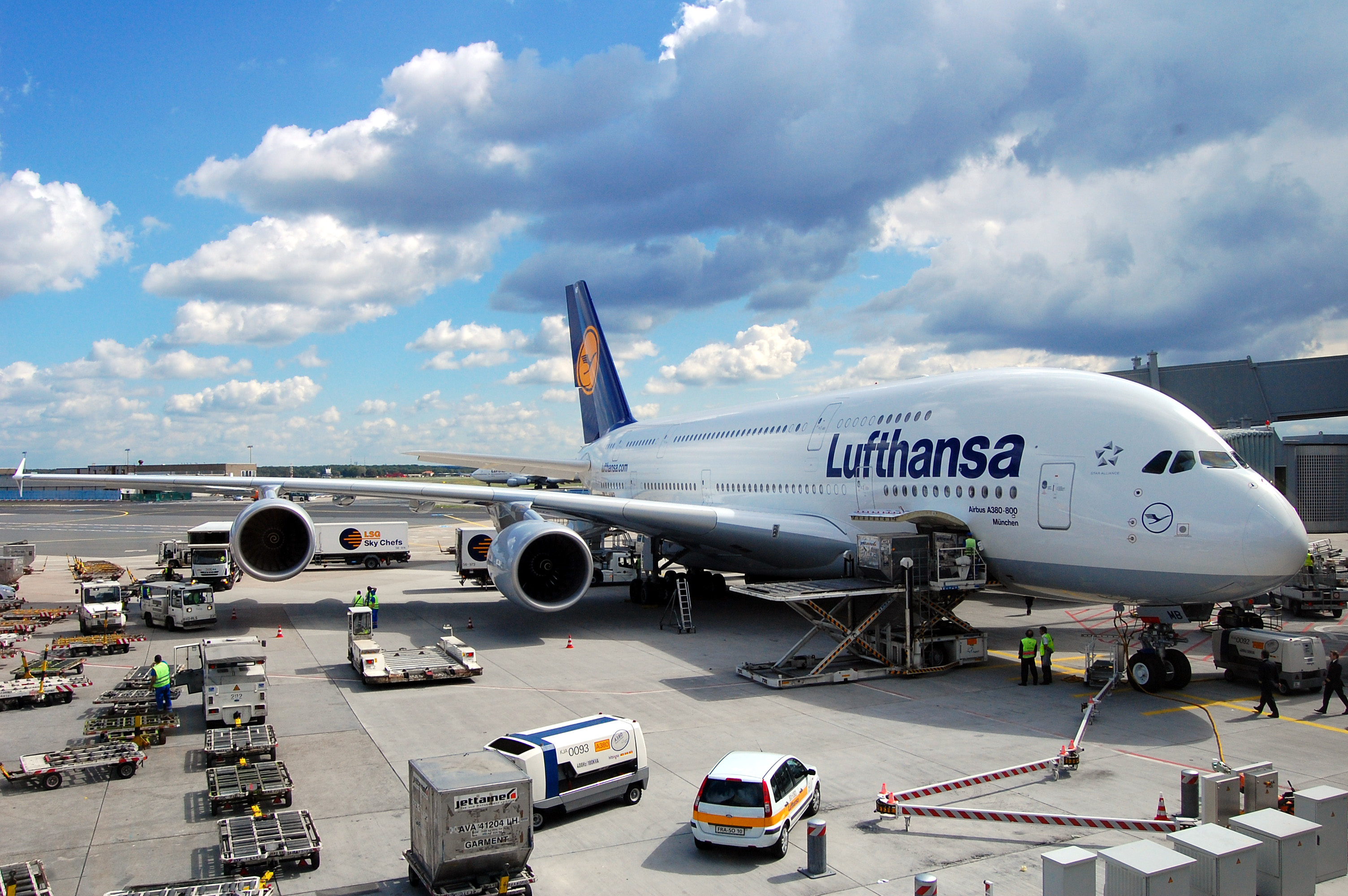
Loading and removing cargo from a Lufthansa Airbus A380 at Frankfurt Airport.

Material handling involves short-distance movement within the confines of a building or between a building and a transportation vehicle. It uses a wide range of manual, semi-automated, and automated equipment and includes consideration of the protection, storage, and control of materials throughout their manufacturing, warehousing, distribution, consumption, and disposal. Material handling can be used to create time and place utility through the handling, storage, and control of waste, as distinct from manufacturing, which creates form utility by changing the shape, form, and makeup of material.

== Role ==
Material handling plays an important role in manufacturing and logistics. Almost every item of physical commerce has been transported on a conveyor or lift truck or another type of material handling equipment in manufacturing plants, warehouses, and retail stores. While material handling is usually required as part of every production worker's job, over 650,000 people in the U.S. work as dedicated "material moving machine operators" and have a median annual wage of $31,530 (May 2012). These operators use material handling equipment to transport various goods in a variety of industrial settings including moving construction materials around building sites or moving goods onto ships.

== Design of material handling systems ==
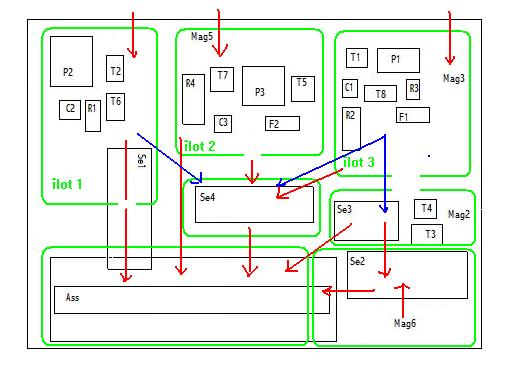
Material flow diagram between activities in a layout

Material handling is integral to the design of most production systems since the efficient flow of material between the activities of a production system is heavily dependent on the arrangement (or layout) of the activities. If two activities are adjacent to each other, then material might easily be handed from one activity to another. If activities are in sequence, a conveyor can move the material at low cost. If activities are separated, more expensive industrial trucks or overhead conveyors are required for transport. The high cost of using an industrial truck for material transport is due to both the labor costs of the operator and the negative impact on the performance of a production system (e.g., increased work in process) when multiple units of material are combined into a single transfer batch in order to reduce the number of trips required for transport.

=== The unit load concept ===
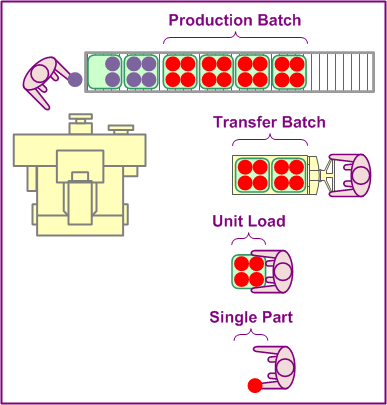
Production batch can be split into a smaller transfer batch containing several unit loads, each of which can contain multiple parts

A unit load is either a single unit of an item, or multiple units so arranged or restricted that they can be handled as a single unit and maintain their integrity. Although granular, liquid, and gaseous materials can be transported in bulk, they can also be contained into unit loads using bags, drums, and cylinders. Advantages of unit loads are that more items can be handled at the same time (thereby reducing the number of trips required, and potentially reducing handling costs, loading and unloading times, and product damage) and that it enables the use of standardized material handling equipment. Disadvantages of unit loads include the negative impact of batching on production system performance, and the cost of returning empty containers/pallets to their point of origin.

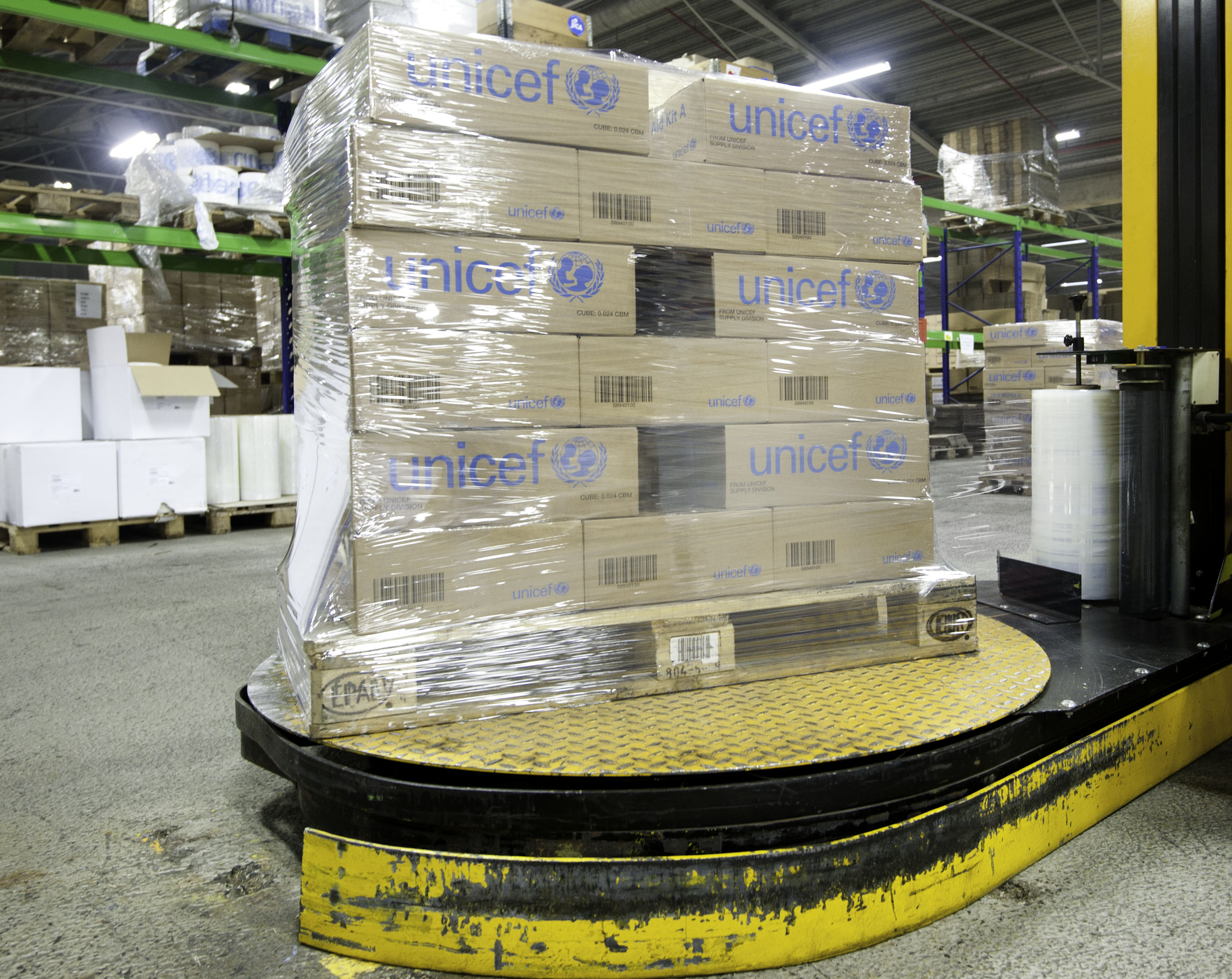
Stretch-wrapping machine used to form a unit load

=== In-process handling ===
Unit loads can be used both for in-process handling and for distribution (receiving, storing, and shipping). Unit load design involves determining the type, size, weight, and configuration of the load; the equipment and method used to handle the load; and the methods of forming (or building) and breaking down the load. For in-process handling, unit loads should not be larger than the production batch size of parts in process. Large production batches (used to increase the utilization of bottleneck activities) can be split into smaller transfer batches for handling purposes, where each transfer batch contains one or more unit loads, and small unit loads can be combined into a larger transfer batch to allow more efficient transport.

=== Distribution ===
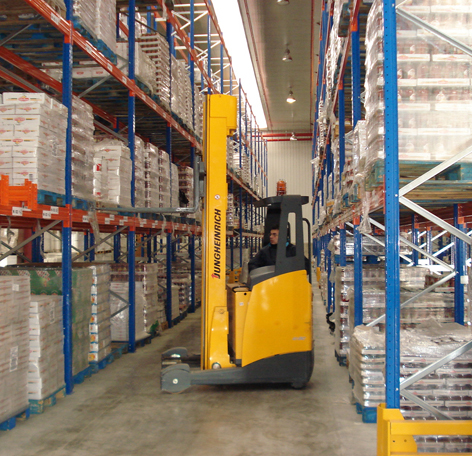
Narrow-aisle lift truck used in distribution

Selecting a unit load size for distribution can be difficult because containers/pallets are usually available only in standard sizes and configurations; truck trailers, rail boxcars, and airplane cargo bays are limited in width, length, and height; and the number of feasible container/pallet sizes for a load may be limited due to the existing warehouse layout and storage rack configurations and customer package/carton size and retail store shelf restrictions. Also, the practical size of a unit load may be limited by the equipment and aisle space available and the need for safe material handling.

== Health and safety ==
Manual material handling work contributes to a large percentage of the over half a million cases of musculoskeletal disorders reported annually in the United States. Musculoskeletal disorders often involve strains and sprains to the lower back, shoulders, and upper limbs. They can result in protracted pain, disability, medical treatment, and financial stress for those afflicted with them, and employers often find themselves paying the bill, either directly or through workers’ compensation insurance, at the same time they must cope with the loss of the full capacity of their workers.

Scientific evidence shows that effective ergonomic interventions can lower the physical demands of MMH work tasks, thereby lowering the incidence and severity of the musculoskeletal injuries they can cause. Their potential for reducing injury related costs alone make ergonomic interventions a useful tool for improving a company’s productivity, product quality, and overall business competitiveness. But very often productivity gets an additional and solid shot in the arm when managers and workers take a fresh look at how best to use energy, equipment, and exertion to get the job done in the most efficient, effective, and effortless way possible. Planning that applies these principles can result in big wins for all concerned.

== Types ==
=== Manual handling ===
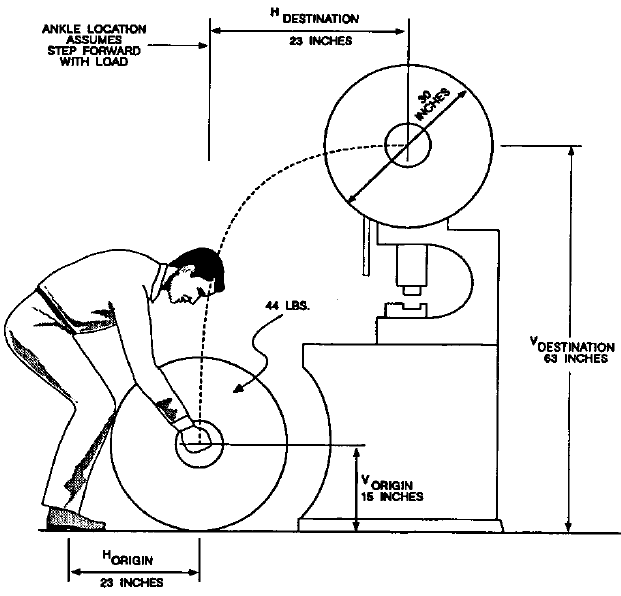
NIOSH Lifting Equation applied to loading punch press stock task

Manual handling refers to the use of a worker’s hands to move individual containers by lifting, lowering, filling, emptying, or carrying them. It can expose workers to physical dangers that can lead to injuries: a large percentage of the over half a million cases of musculoskeletal disorders reported in the U.S. each year arise from manual handling, and often involve strains and sprains to a person's lower back, shoulders and upper limbs.

Ergonomic improvements can be used to modify manual handling tasks to reduce injury. These improvements can include reconfiguring the task and using positioning equipment like lift/tilt/turn tables, hoists, balancers, and manipulators to reduce reaching and bending. The NIOSH (National Institute for Occupational Safety and Health) 1991 Revised Lifting Equation can be used to evaluate manual lifting tasks. Under ideal circumstances, the maximum recommended weight for manual lifting to avoid back injuries is 51 lb (23.13 kg). Using the exact conditions of the lift (height, distance lifted, weight, position of weight relative to body, asymmetrical lifts, and objects that are difficult to grasp), six multipliers are used to reduce the maximum recommended weight for less than ideal lifting tasks.

=== Automated handling ===
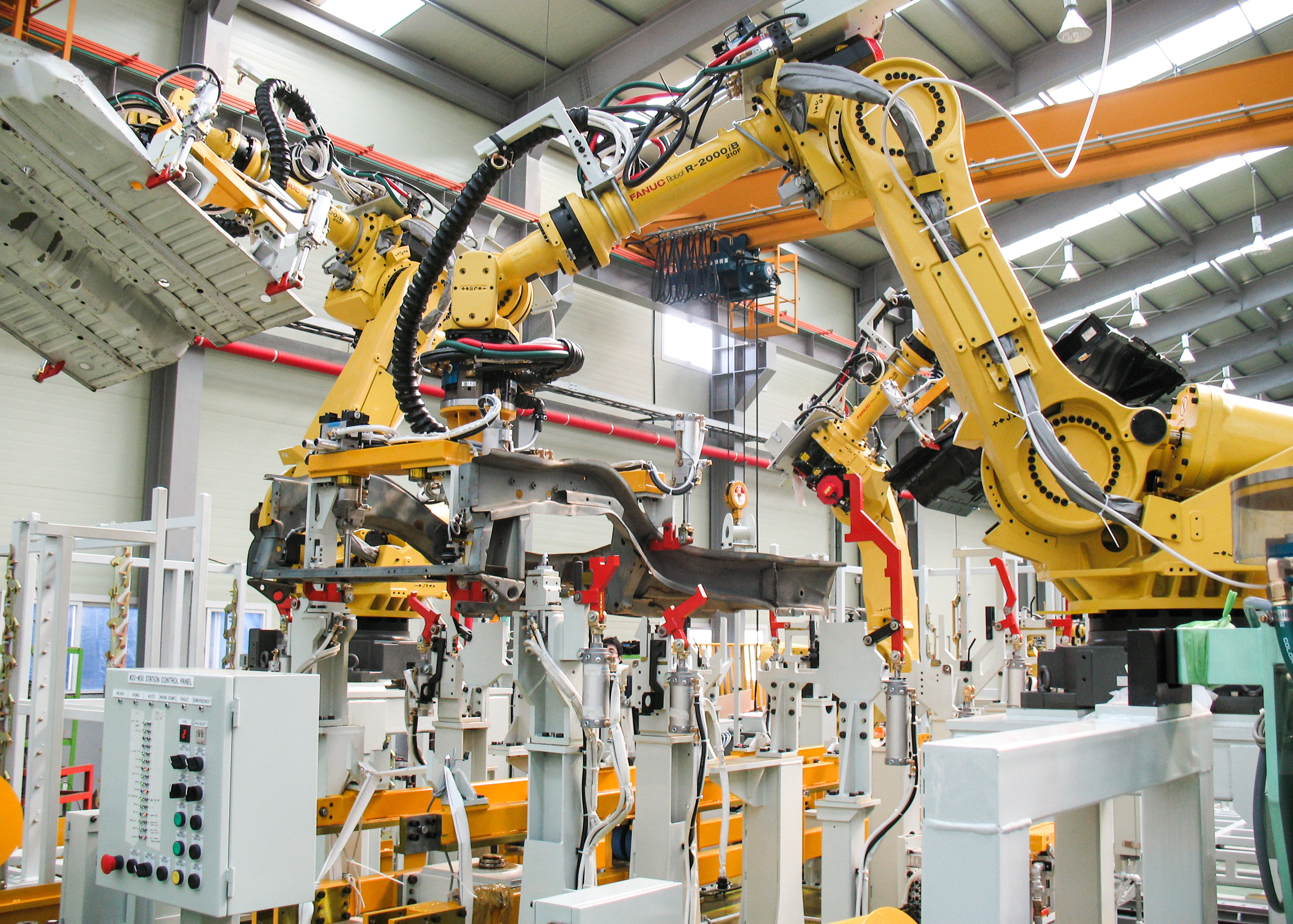
Industrial robot

Whenever technically and economically feasible, equipment can be used to reduce and sometimes replace the need to manually handle material. Most existing material handling equipment is only semi-automated because a human operator is needed for tasks like loading/unloading and driving that are difficult and/or too costly to fully automate. However, ongoing advances in sensing, machine intelligence, and robotics have made it possible to fully automate an increasing number of handling tasks. A rough guide to determine how much can be spent for automated equipment that would replace one material handler is to consider that, with benefits, the median moving machine operator costs a company $45,432 per year. Assuming a real interest rate of 1.7% and a service life of 5 years with no adoption/adaptation cost, no learning cost, no training cost, and no operating cost for equipment with no salvage value, a company should be willing to pay up to

$\$45\,432\left (\frac{1-1.017^{-5}}{0.017} \right )=\$45\,432(4.75)=\$219\,019$

to purchase automated equipment to replace one worker. In many cases, automated equipment is not as flexible as a human operator, both with respect to not being able to do a particular task as well as a human and not being able to be as easily redeployed to do other tasks as needs change.

== See also ==
- Automated storage and retrieval system
- Automation
- Bulk material handling
- College-Industry Council on Material Handling Education
- Conveyor system
- Human factors and ergonomics
- Industrial robot
- Material handling equipment
- Warehouse
- Unit load
