= Corus Trojan locomotive =

Heavy shunting diesel locomotive

Trojan
Type and origin
- Power type: Diesel
- Builder: Corus Northern Engineering Services (CNES)
- Model: Trojan 100BB710
- Build date: 2009-10
- Total produced: 4
- Rebuilder: Hunslet Engine Company
Specifications
- Configuration
  - UIC: B'B'
- Gauge: 1,435 mm (4 ft 8 1/2 in)
- Loco weight: 100 t
- Prime mover: CAT C27
- Transmission: Voith L 3r4 zeU2 turbo reversing Cardan shaft drive
Performance figures
- Maximum speed: 24 km/h (15 mph)
- Power output: 708kW @1800rpm (engine)
Career
- Numbers: 920 to 923
- Figures refer to 4 axle locomotives built for Port Talbot steelworks - source: except where noted.

The Corus Trojan is a type of heavy shunting industrial diesel locomotive designed and manufactured by Corus Northern Engineering Services in Scunthorpe, UK in 2007–2009, and re-manufactured by the Hunslet Engine Company from 2011 due to design flaws.

== History and design ==
In February 2007 Corus announced that it was to build four 100 tonne, 1,000 hp (750 kW) 4 axle locomotives; the locomotives were to be constructed by Corus Northern Engineering Services at their workshop at the Scunthorpe Steelworks in Lincolnshire, UK; the locomotive design was carried out by Railcraft Associates (Doncaster). The Port Talbot locomotives were to be used to move torpedo wagons – the design specification included the ability to haul 1400 tonne trains at 8 km/h (2.2 m/s) on a 14 ‰ gradient.

The 'Trojan' range included B, C, B'B' and C'C' wheel arrangement designs, with an axleload of up to 25 tonnes, and capable of being built to track gauges between 610mm and 1676mm. Locomotives could be supplied with a variety of diesel engines, up to 3,000 hp (2,200 kW), with diesel electric or diesel hydraulic transmissions, with either radial arm or commonwealth type bogie suspension designs, and with single or double cab variants. The family was designed for industrial operators, and trip work.

The Port Talbot locomotive's chassis were constructed at Corus's Llanwern site, with assembly at Scunthorpe taking place during 2008. The first locomotive, number 920, went into service in late 2009. Units 921 and 922 were delivered in 2011.

The locomotives were found to have a number of design issues, and the fourth unit was modified by the Hunslet Engine Company. Modifications included the replacement of a ceiling-mounted driving panel to a more conventional position, replacement of the engine control electronics, and other modifications to solve a number of teething and design issues. Dynamic testing of the rebuilt locomotive took place at the Chasewater Railway, and the locomotive began in-service testing at Port Talbot steelworks in April 2012. The other 3 locomotives were also to be modified by Hunslet in 2012.
