= Automated guided vehicle =

Type of portable robot

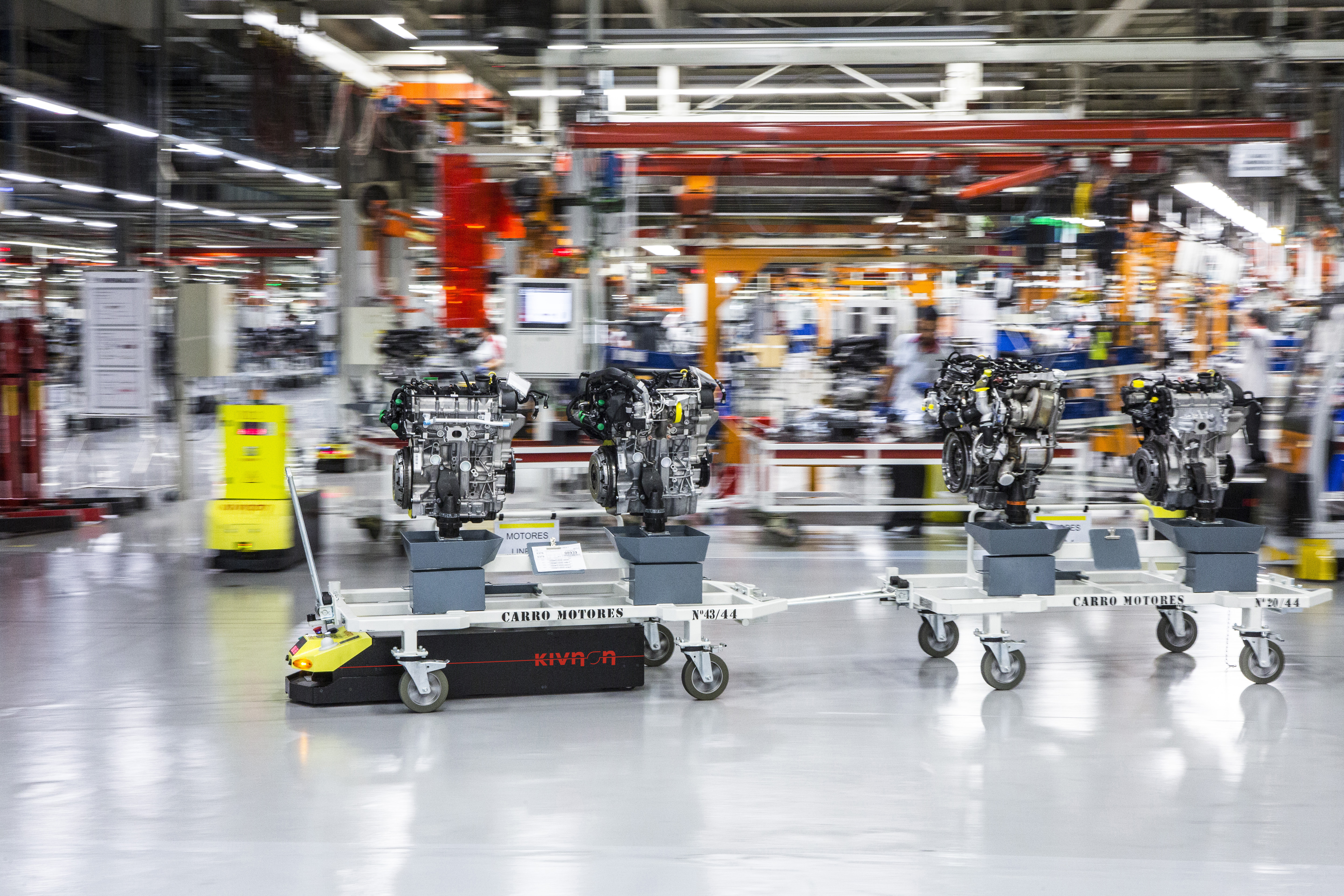

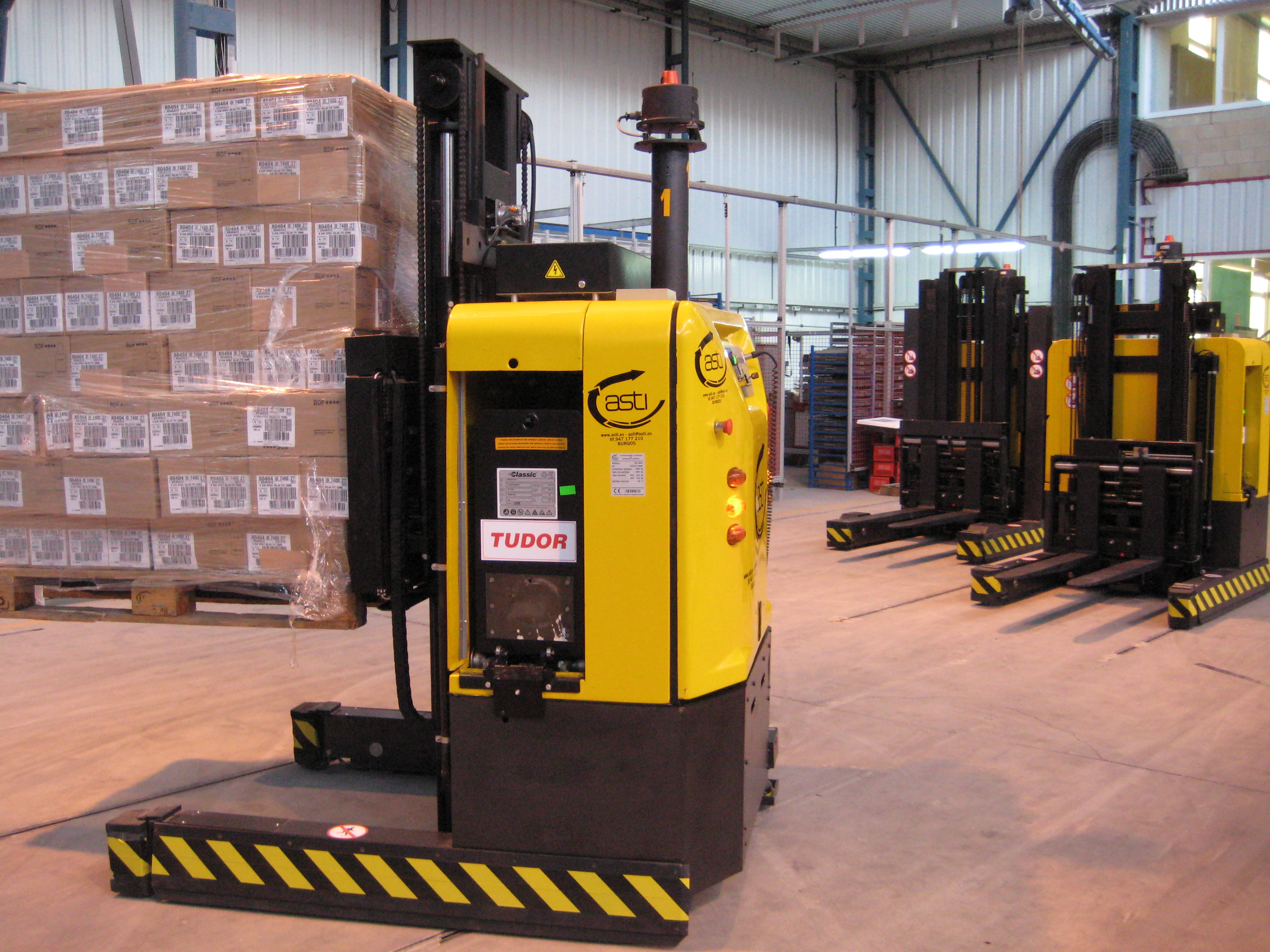

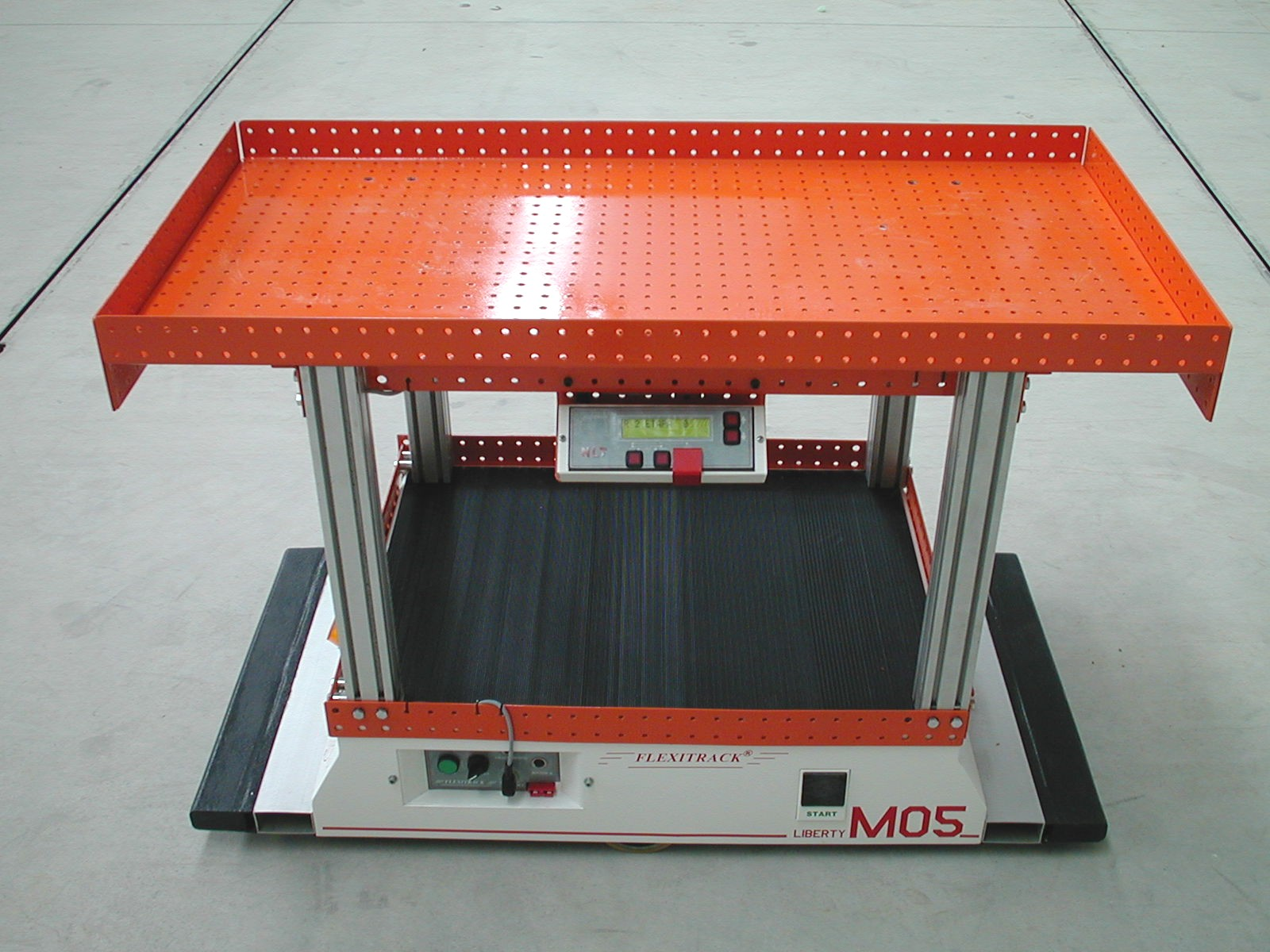

An automated guided vehicle (AGV) is a portable robot that, unlike an autonomous mobile robot (AMR), follows along marked long lines or wires on the floor, or uses radio waves, vision cameras, magnets, or lasers for navigation. They are most often used in industrial applications to transport heavy materials around a large industrial building, such as a factory or warehouse. The application of AGVs broadened during the late 20th century.

== Introduction ==
Automated guided vehicles can tow objects behind them in trailers to which they can autonomously attach. The trailers can be used to move raw materials or finished products. The AGV can also store objects on a bed. The objects can be placed on a set of motorized rollers (conveyor) and then pushed off by reversing them. AGVs are employed in nearly every industry, including pulp, paper, metals, newspaper, and general manufacturing. Transporting materials such as food, linen or medicine in hospitals is also done.

An AGV can also be called a laser guided vehicle (LGV). In Germany the technology is also called Fahrerloses Transportsystem (FTS) and in Sweden förarlösa truckar. Lower cost versions of AGVs are often called Automated Guided Carts (AGCs) and are usually guided by magnetic tape. The term autonomous mobile robot is sometimes used to differentiate the mobile robots that do not rely in their navigation on extra infrastructure in the environment (like magnetic strips or visual markers) from those that do; the latter are then called AGVs.

AGVs are available in a variety of models and can be used to move products on an assembly line, transport goods throughout a plant or warehouse, and deliver loads.

The first AGV was brought to market in the 1950s, by Barrett Electronics of Northbrook, Illinois, and at the time it was simply a tow truck that followed a wire in the floor instead of a rail. Out of this technology came a new type of AGV, which follows invisible UV markers on the floor instead of being towed by a chain. The first such system was deployed at the Willis Tower (formerly Sears Tower) in Chicago, Illinois to deliver mail throughout its offices.

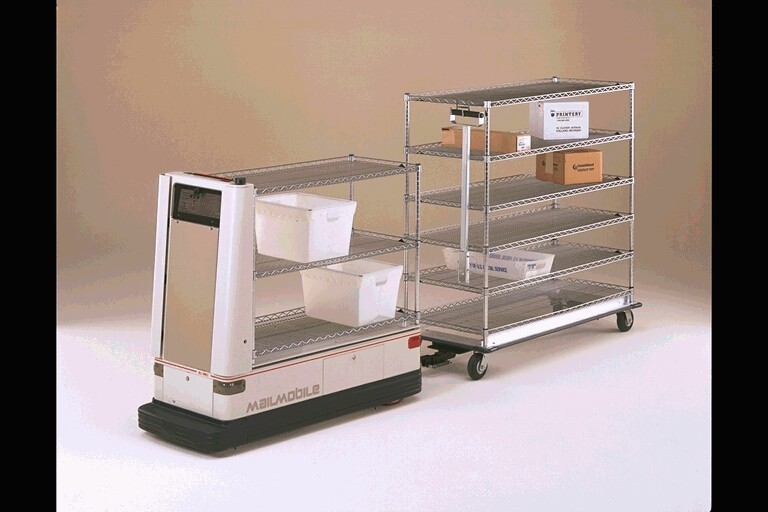
Packmobile with trailer AGV

Over the years the technology has become more sophisticated and today automated vehicles are mainly Laser navigated e.g. LGV (Laser Guided Vehicle). In an automated process, LGVs are programmed to communicate with other robots to ensure product is moved smoothly through the warehouse, whether it is being stored for future use or sent directly to shipping areas. Today, the AGV plays an important role in the design of new factories and warehouses, safely moving goods to their rightful destination.

== Navigation ==
=== Wired ===
A slot is cut into the floor, and a wire is placed below the surface along the path the AGV is to follow. This wire generates a magnetic field, which is detected by a sensor on the bottom of the AGV, close to the ground. The sensor detects the relative position of the magnetic field generated by the current in the wire. This information is used to regulate the AGV's steering system, ensuring it follows the wire path accurately.

=== Optical guidepath ===
A stripe of ultraviolet reactive material is applied to the floor. This can be paint or UV reactive tape. The AGVs are equipped with ultraviolet light emitters and detectors. The control system for the vehicle identifies the stripe on the floor, and makes the necessary adjustments to the vehicle heading to remain on the guidepath. This navigation method requires less augmentation of the environment than guide wire localization.

=== Laser target navigation ===
Navigation for AGVs can be achieved using retro-reflective laser guidance. In this system, reflective markers are placed on walls, poles, or fixed machines within the AGV's operational area. The AGV is equipped with a laser scanner that emits laser beams to detect these reflectors. The position of the AGV is determined by measuring the angle and distance to the reflectors within its line of sight. This information is compared to a stored map of the reflector layout in the AGV's memory, allowing the navigation system to triangulate its current position. The AGV then adjusts its steering based on its position relative to the programmed path defined by the reflector layout.

This method also doesn't necessarily restrict the AGVs to fixed paths; they are capable of localization and navigation in any area where two to three reflective markers are visible.

- Modulated Lasers: Emits a continuous beam of light, providing uninterrupted reflections and high accuracy. A two-dimensional laser scanner is mounted atop each AGV, typically centered along the width axis of the vehicle and towards the front control panel. The scanner emits a modulated laser light, rotating and covering a 360° angle ten or more times per second up to several hundred feet in distance.
- Pulsed Lasers: This method involves emitting rapid pulses of laser light. This technique is crucial for creating detailed 3D maps of the environment.

=== Inertial (Gyroscopic) navigation ===
Another form of an AGV guidance is inertial navigation. With inertial guidance, a computer control system directs and assigns tasks to the vehicles. Transponders are embedded in the floor of the work place. The AGV uses these transponders to verify that the vehicle is on course. A gyroscope is able to detect the slightest change in the direction of the vehicle and corrects it in order to keep the AGV on its path. The margin of error for the inertial method is ±1 inch.

Inertial can operate in nearly any environment including tight aisles or extreme temperatures. Inertial navigation can include use of magnets embedded in the floor of the facility that the vehicle can read and follow.

=== Natural feature (Natural Targeting) navigation ===
Navigation without retrofitting of the workspace is called Natural Features or Natural Targeting Navigation. One method uses one or more range-finding sensors, such as a laser range-finder, as well as gyroscopes or inertial measurement units with Monte-Carlo/Markov localization techniques to understand where it is as it dynamically plans the shortest permitted path to its goal. The advantage of such systems is that they are highly flexible for on-demand delivery to any location. They can handle failure without bringing down the entire manufacturing operation, since AGVs can plan paths around the failed device. They also are quick to install, with less down-time for the factory.

=== Vision guidance ===
Vision-guided AGVs can be installed with no modifications to the environment or infrastructure. They operate by using cameras to record features along the route, allowing the AGV to replay the route by using the recorded features to navigate. Vision-guided AGVs use Evidence Grid technology, an application of probabilistic volumetric sensing, and was invented and initially developed by Dr. Hans Moravec at Carnegie Mellon University. The Evidence Grid technology uses probabilities of occupancy for each point in space to compensate for the uncertainty in the performance of sensors and in the environment. The primary navigation sensors are specially designed stereo cameras. The vision-guided AGV uses 360-degree images to build a 3D map, which allows the vision-guided AGVs to follow a trained route without human assistance or the addition of special features, landmarks or positioning systems.

=== Geoguidance ===
A geoguided AGV recognizes its environment to establish its location. Without any infrastructure, the forklift equipped with geoguidance technology detects and identifies columns, racks and walls within the warehouse. Using these fixed references, it can position itself, in real time and determine its route. There are no limitations on distances to cover number of pick-up or drop-off locations. Routes are infinitely modifiable.

== Steering control ==
To help an AGV navigate it can use three different steer control systems. The differential speed control is the most common. In this method there are two independent drive wheels. Each drive is driven at different speeds in order to turn or the same speed to allow the AGV to go forwards or backwards. The AGV turns in a similar fashion to a tank. This method of steering is the simplest as it does not require additional steering motors and mechanism. More often than not, this is seen on an AGV that is used to transport and turn in tight spaces or when the AGV is working near machines. This setup for the wheels is not used in towing applications because the AGV would cause the trailer to jackknife when it turned.

The second type of steering used is steered wheel control AGV. This type of steering can be similar to a car's steering. But this is not very manoeuvrable. It is more common to use a three-wheeled vehicle similar to a conventional three wheeled forklift. The drive wheel is the turning wheel. It is more precise in following the programmed path than the differential speed controlled method. This type of AGV has smoother turning. Steered wheel control AGV can be used in all applications; unlike the differential controlled. Steered wheel control is used for towing and can also at times have an operator control it.

The third type is a combination of differential and steered. Two independent steer/drive motors are placed on diagonal corners of the AGV and swivelling castors are placed on the other corners. It can turn like a car (rotating in an arc) in any direction. It can crab in any direction and it can drive in differential mode in any direction.

== Path decision ==
AGVs have to make decisions on path selection. This is done through different methods: frequency select mode (wired navigation only), and path select mode (wireless navigation only) or via a magnetic tape on the floor not only to guide the AGV but also to issue steering commands and speed commands.

=== Frequency select mode ===
Frequency select mode bases its decision on the frequencies being emitted from the floor. When an AGV approaches a point on the wire which splits the AGV detects the two frequencies and through a table stored in its memory decides on the best path. The different frequencies are required only at the decision point for the AGV. The frequencies can change back to one set signal after this point. This method is not easily expandable and requires extra cutting, which makes the process more expensive.

=== Path select mode ===
An AGV using the path select mode chooses a path based on preprogrammed paths. It uses the measurements taken from the sensors and compares them to values given to them by programmers. When an AGV approaches a decision point it only has to decide whether to follow path 1, 2, 3, etc. This decision is rather simple since it already knows its path from its programming. This method can increase the cost of an AGV because it is required to have a team of programmers to program the AGV with the correct paths and change the paths when necessary. This method is easy to change and set up.

=== Magnetic tape mode ===
The magnetic tape is laid on the surface of the floor or buried in a 10mm channel; not only does it provide the path for the AGV to follow but also strips of the tape in different combinations of polarity, sequence, and distance laid alongside the track tell the AGV to change lane, speed up, slow down, and stop.

== Traffic control ==
Flexible manufacturing systems containing more than one AGV may require it to have traffic control so the AGVs will not run into one another. Traffic control can be carried out locally or by software running on a fixed computer elsewhere in the facility. Local methods include zone control, forward sensing control, and combination control. Each method has its advantages and disadvantages.

=== Zone control ===
Zone control is the favorite of most environments because it is simple to install and easy to expand. Zone control uses a wireless transmitter to transmit a signal in a fixed area. Each AGV contains a sensing device to receive this signal and transmit back to the transmitter. If the area is clear the signal is set at "clear" allowing any AGV to enter and pass through the area. When an AGV is in the area the "stop" signal is sent and all AGV attempting to enter the area stop and wait for their turn. Once the AGV in the zone has moved out beyond the zone the "clear" signal is sent to one of the waiting AGVs. Another way to set up zone control traffic management is to equip each individual robot with its own small transmitter/receiver. The individual AGV then sends its own "do not enter" message to all the AGVs getting too close to its zone in the area. A problem with this method is if one zone goes down all the AGVs are at risk to collide with any other AGV. Zone control is a cost efficient way to control the AGV in an area.

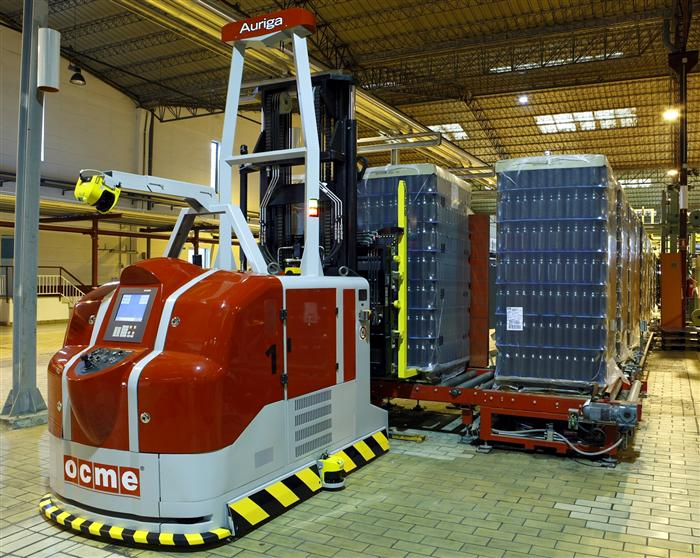
Forklift AGV with safety laser sensors (fully automated)

=== Forward sensing control ===
Forward sensing control uses collision avoidance sensors to avoid collisions with other AGV in the area. These sensors include: sonic, which work like radar; optical, which uses an infrared sensor; and bumper, physical contact sensor. Most AGVs are equipped with a bumper sensor of some sort as a fail-safe. Sonic sensors send a "chirp" or high frequency signal out and then wait for a reply from the outline of the reply the AGV can determine if an object is ahead of it and take the necessary actions to avoid collision. The optical uses an infrared transmitter/receiver and sends an infrared signal which then gets reflected back; working on a similar concept as the sonic sensor. The problems with these are they can only protect the AGV from so many sides. They are relatively hard to install and work with as well.

=== Combination control ===
Combination control sensing is using collision avoidance sensors as well as the zone control sensors. The combination of the two helps to prevent collisions in any situation. For normal operation the zone control is used with the collision avoidance as a fail safe. For example, if the zone control system is down, the collision avoidance system would prevent the AGV from colliding.

== System management ==
Industries with AGVs need to have some sort of control over the AGVs. There are three main ways to control the AGV: locator panel, CRT color graphics display, and central logging and report.

A locator panel is a simple panel used to see which area the AGV is in. If the AGV is in one area for too long, it could mean it is stuck or broken down. CRT color graphics display shows real time where each vehicle is. It also gives a status of the AGV, its battery voltage, unique identifier, and can show blocked spots. Central logging used to keep track of the history of all the AGVs in the system. Central logging stores all the data and history from these vehicles which can be printed out for technical support or logged to check for up time.

AGV is a system often used in FMS to keep up, transport, and connect smaller subsystems into one large production unit. AGVs employ a lot of technology to ensure they do not hit one another and make sure they get to their destination. Loading and transportation of materials from one area to another is the main task of the AGV. AGV require a lot of money to get started with, but they do their jobs with high efficiency. In places such as Japan automation has increased and is now considered to be twice as efficient as factories in America. For a huge initial cost the total cost over time decreases.

== Vehicle types ==
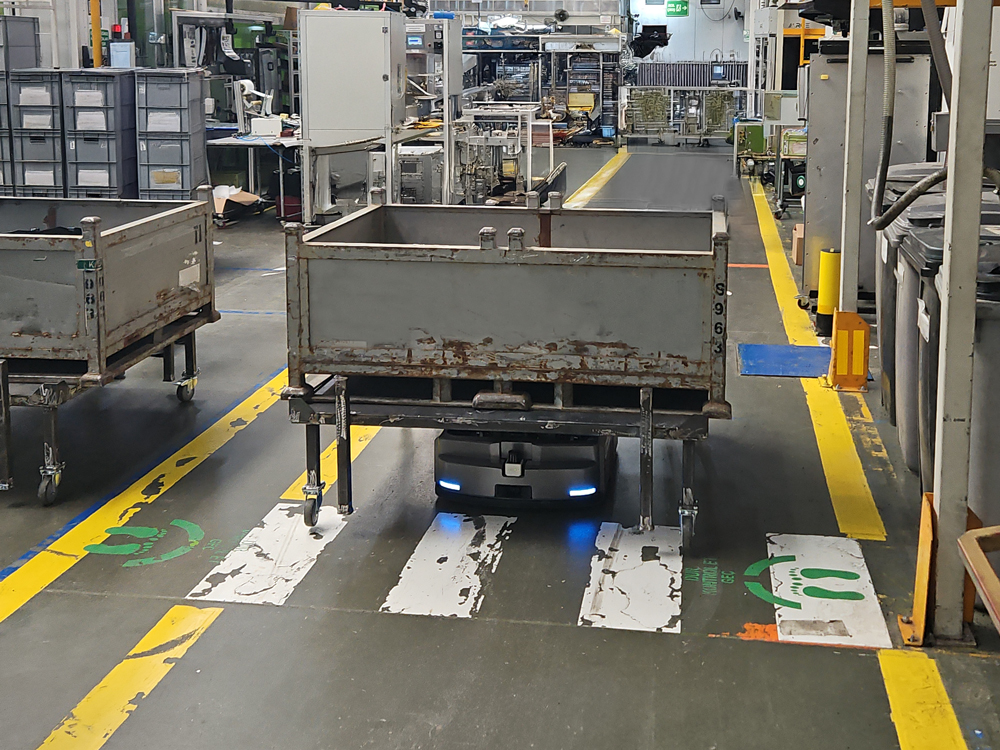
AGV carrying loads between processes

- Towing Vehicles (also called "tugger" vehicles) were the first type introduced and are still a very popular type today. Towing vehicles can pull a multitude of trailer types and have capacities ranging from 2,000 pounds to 160,000 pounds.
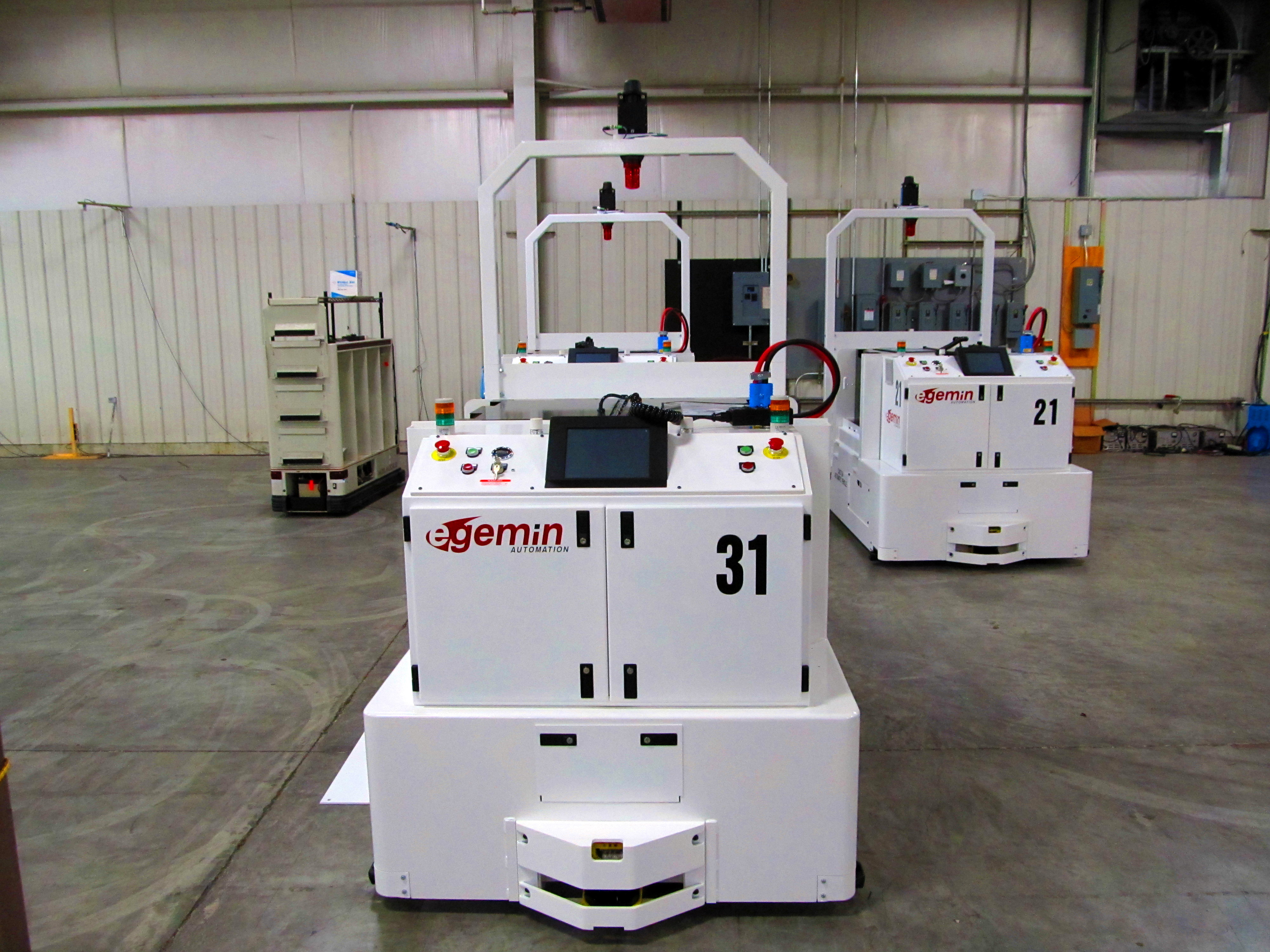
  Tugger AGVs can move trailers or trains of trailers more safely than a manually operated tugger.

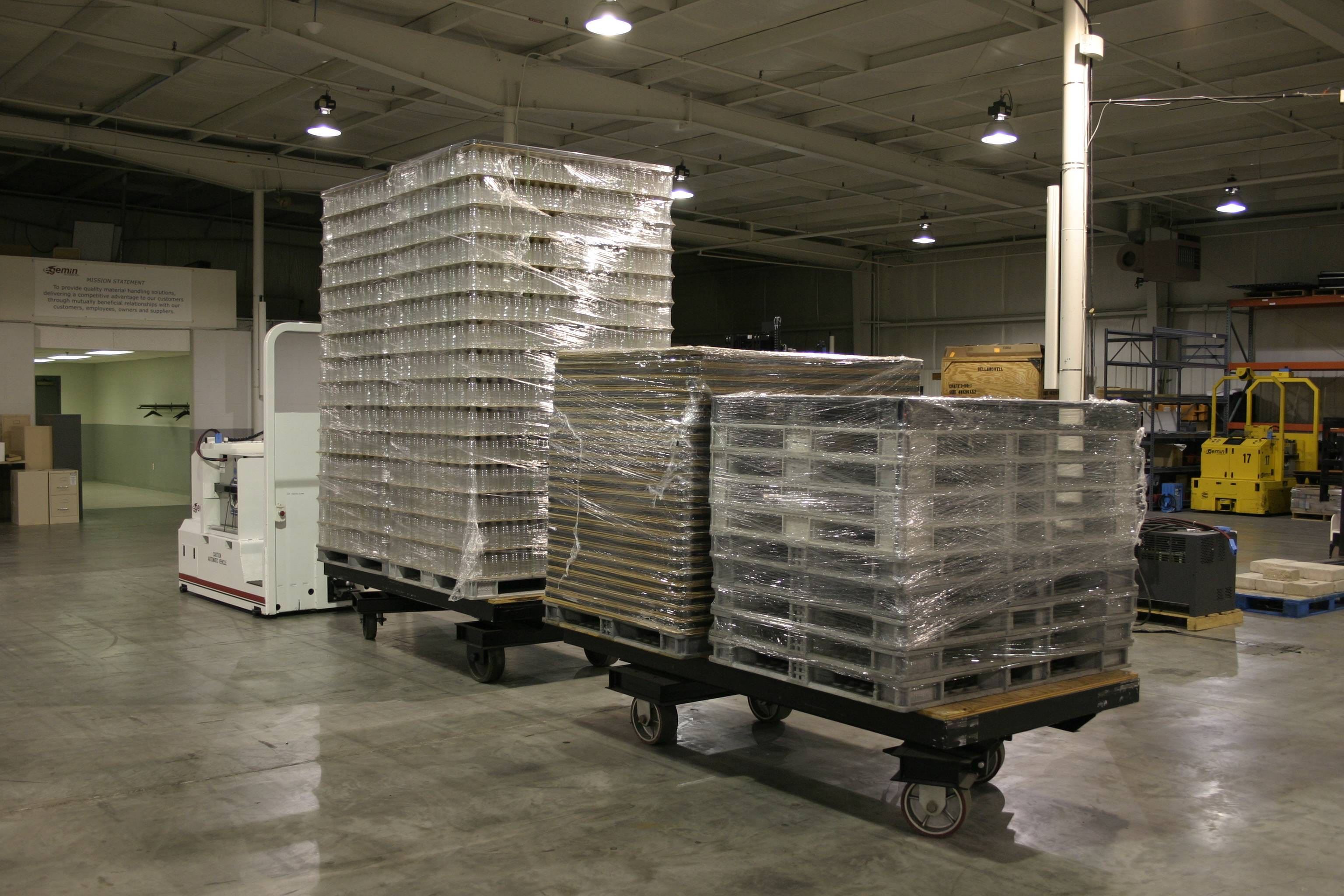
Tugger AGV towing multiple trailers in a warehouse environment

- AGVS Unit Load Vehicles are equipped with decks, which permit unit load transportation and often automatic load transfer. The decks can either be lift and lower type, powered or non-powered roller, chain or belt decks or custom decks with multiple compartments.
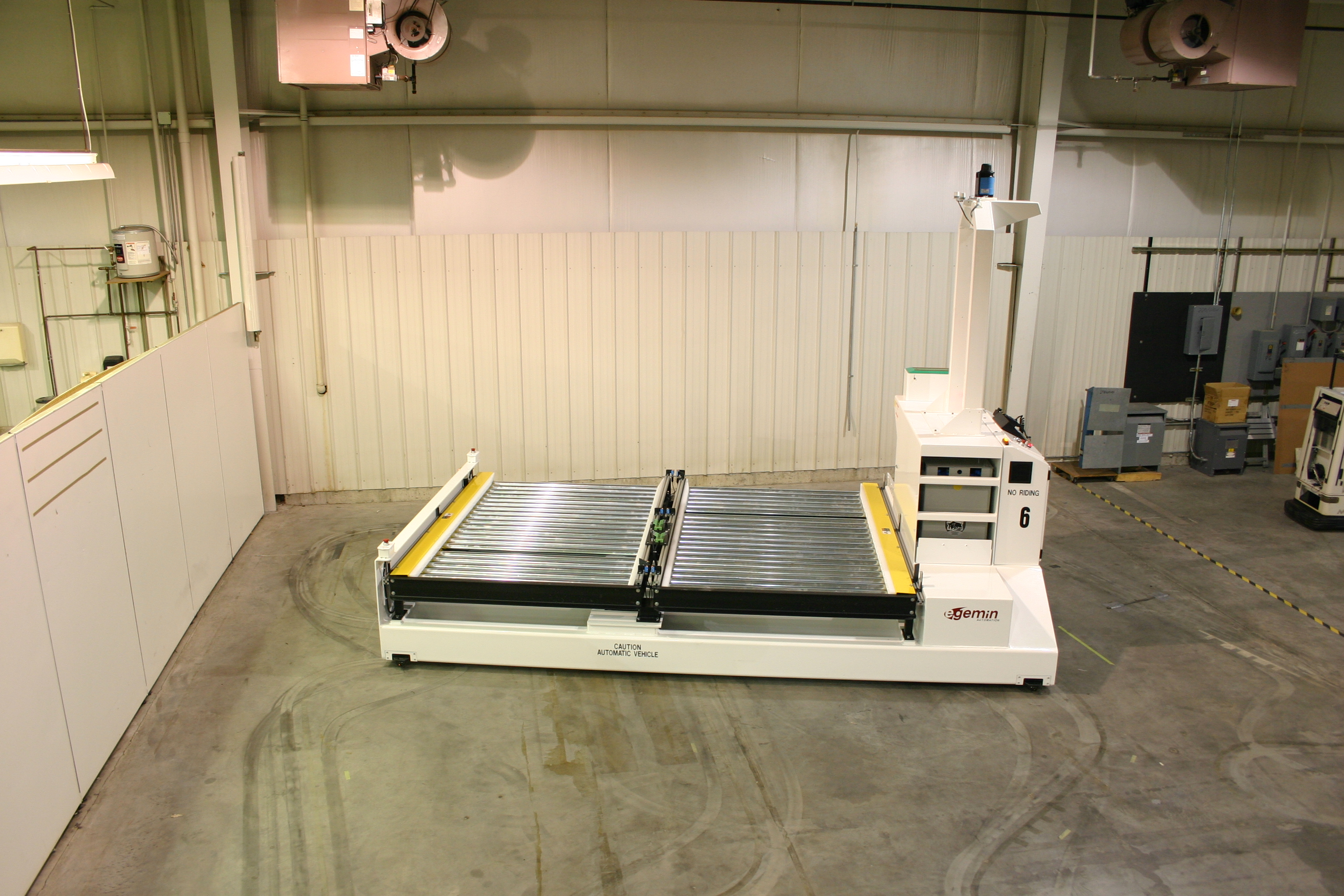
  Unitload AGV (dual)
- AGVS Pallet Trucks are designed to transport palletized loads to and from floor level; eliminating the need for fixed load stands.
- AGVS Fork Truck has the ability to service loads both at floor level and on stands. In some cases these vehicles can also stack loads in rack. They can sometimes lift up to 30' to store or retrieve on high-bay racking.
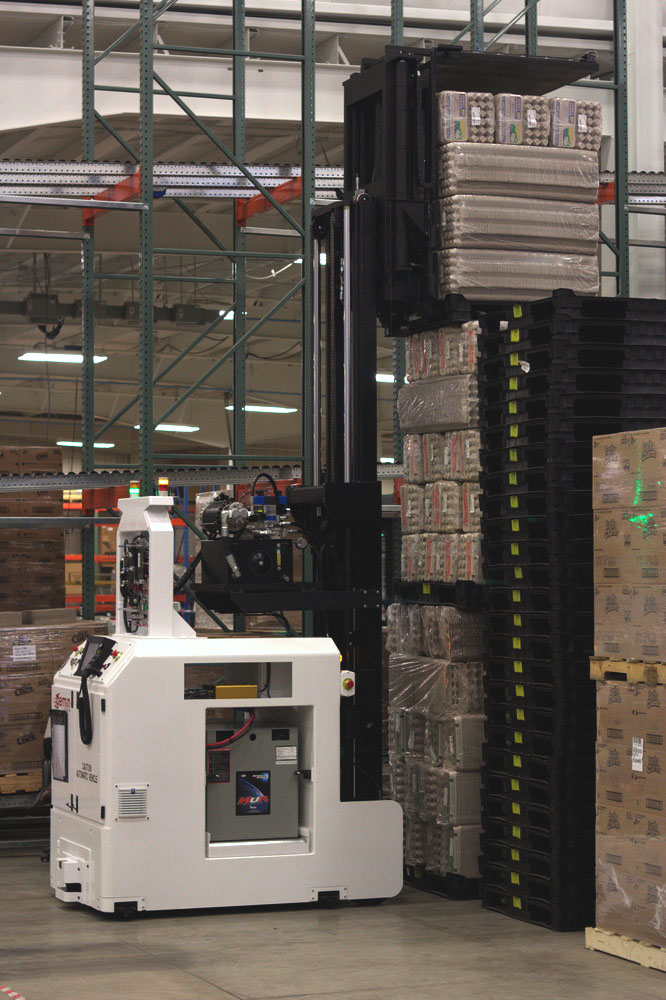
  Forklift AGV with Stabilizer Pad
- AGVS Hybrid Vehicles are adapted from a standard man-aboard truck so that they can run fully automated or be driven by a fork truck driver. These can be used for trailer loading as well as moving materials around warehouses. Most often, they are equipped with forks, but can be customized to accommodate most load types.
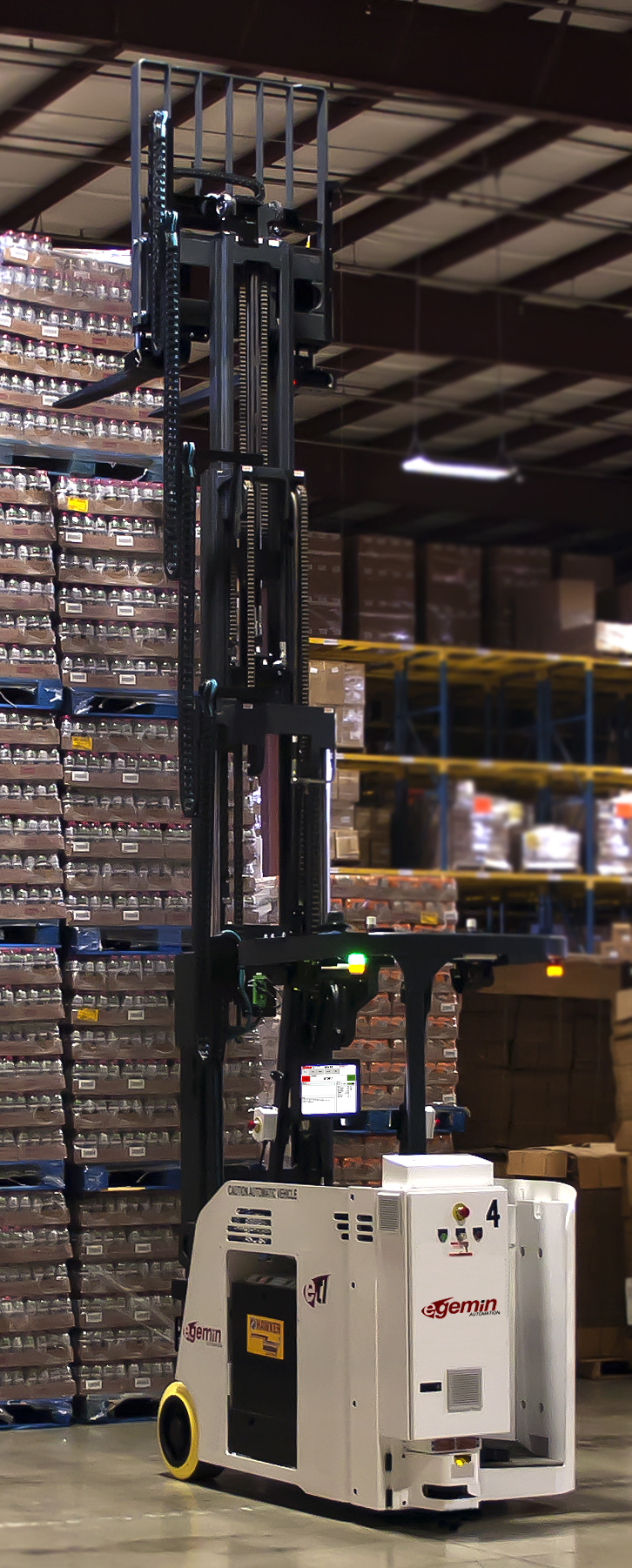
  Hybrid AGV picking load
- Light Load AGVS are vehicles which have capacities in the neighborhood of 500 pounds or less and are used to transport small parts, baskets, or other light loads though a light manufacturing environment. They are designed to operate in areas with limited space.
- AGVS Assembly Line Vehicles are an adaptation of the light load AGVS for applications involving serial assembly processes.

== Common applications ==
Automated Guided Vehicles can be used in a wide variety of applications to transport many different types of material including pallets, rolls, racks, carts, and containers. AGVs excel in applications with the following characteristics:

- Repetitive movement of materials over a distance
- Regular delivery of stable loads
- Medium throughput/volume
- When on-time delivery is critical and late deliveries are causing inefficiency
- Operations with at least two shifts
- Processes where tracking material is important

A wide variety of AGV solutions is developed for warehouse management, such as Veho for robotic delivery assistance, Gather AI for warehouse tracking solutions, Exotec for high-density storage, Pickle Robot for heavy loads, ... DHL partnered with Boston Dynamics to develop unloading and box-moving stretch robots, and Honeywell Intelligrated developed an AI for unloading articulated arm robots.

=== Handling raw materials ===
AGVs are commonly used to transport raw materials such as paper, steel, rubber, metal, and plastic. This includes transporting materials from receiving to the warehouse, and delivering materials directly to production lines.

=== Work-in-process movement ===
Work-in-Process movement is one of the first applications where automated guided vehicles were used, and includes the repetitive movement of materials throughout the manufacturing process. AGVs can be used to move material from the warehouse to production/processing lines or from one process to another.

=== Pallet handling ===
Pallet handling is an extremely popular application for AGVs as repetitive movement of pallets is very common in manufacturing and distribution facilities. AGVs can move pallets from the palletizer to stretch wrapping, to the warehouse/storage area, or to the outbound shipping docks

=== Finished product handling ===
Moving finished goods from manufacturing to storage or shipping is the final movement of materials before they are delivered to customers. These movements often require the gentlest material handling because the products are complete and subject to damage from rough handling. Because AGVs operate with precisely controlled navigation and acceleration and deceleration this minimizes the potential for damage making them an excellent choice for this type of application

=== Trailer loading ===
Automatic loading of trailers is a relatively new application for automated guided vehicles and becoming increasingly popular. AGVs are used to transport and load pallets of finished goods directly into standard, over-the-road trailers without any special dock equipment. AGVs can pick up pallets from conveyors, racking, or staging lanes and deliver them into the trailer in the specified loading pattern. Some Automatic Trailer Loading AGVs utilize Natural Targeting to view the walls of the trailer for navigation. These types of ATL AGVs can be either completely driverless or hybrid vehicles.

=== Roll handling ===
AGVs are used to transport rolls in many types of plant including paper mills, converters, printers, newspapers, steel producers, and plastics manufacturers. AGVs can store and stack rolls on the floor, in racking, and can even automatically load printing presses with rolls of paper.

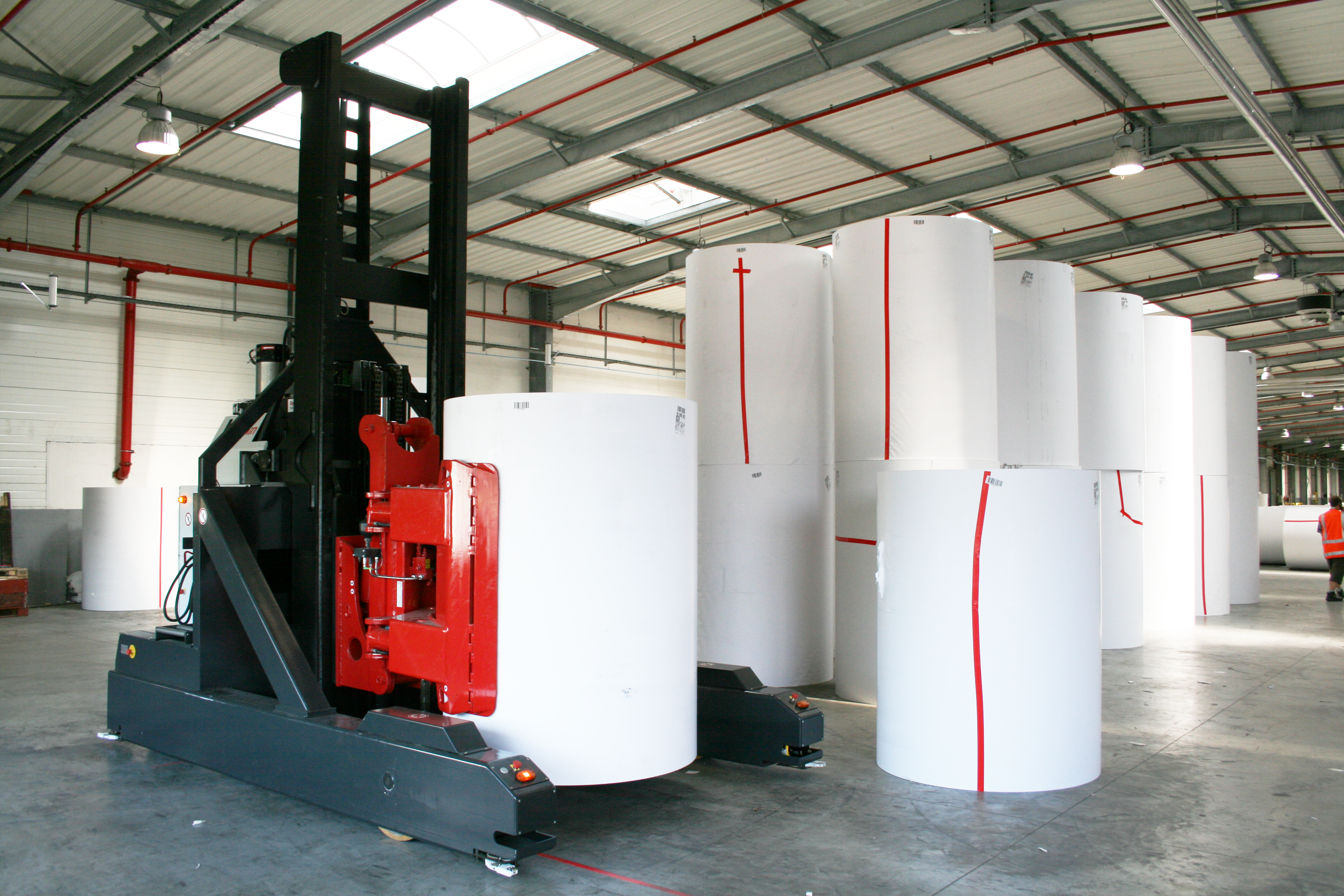
Roll Clamp AGV

=== Container handling ===
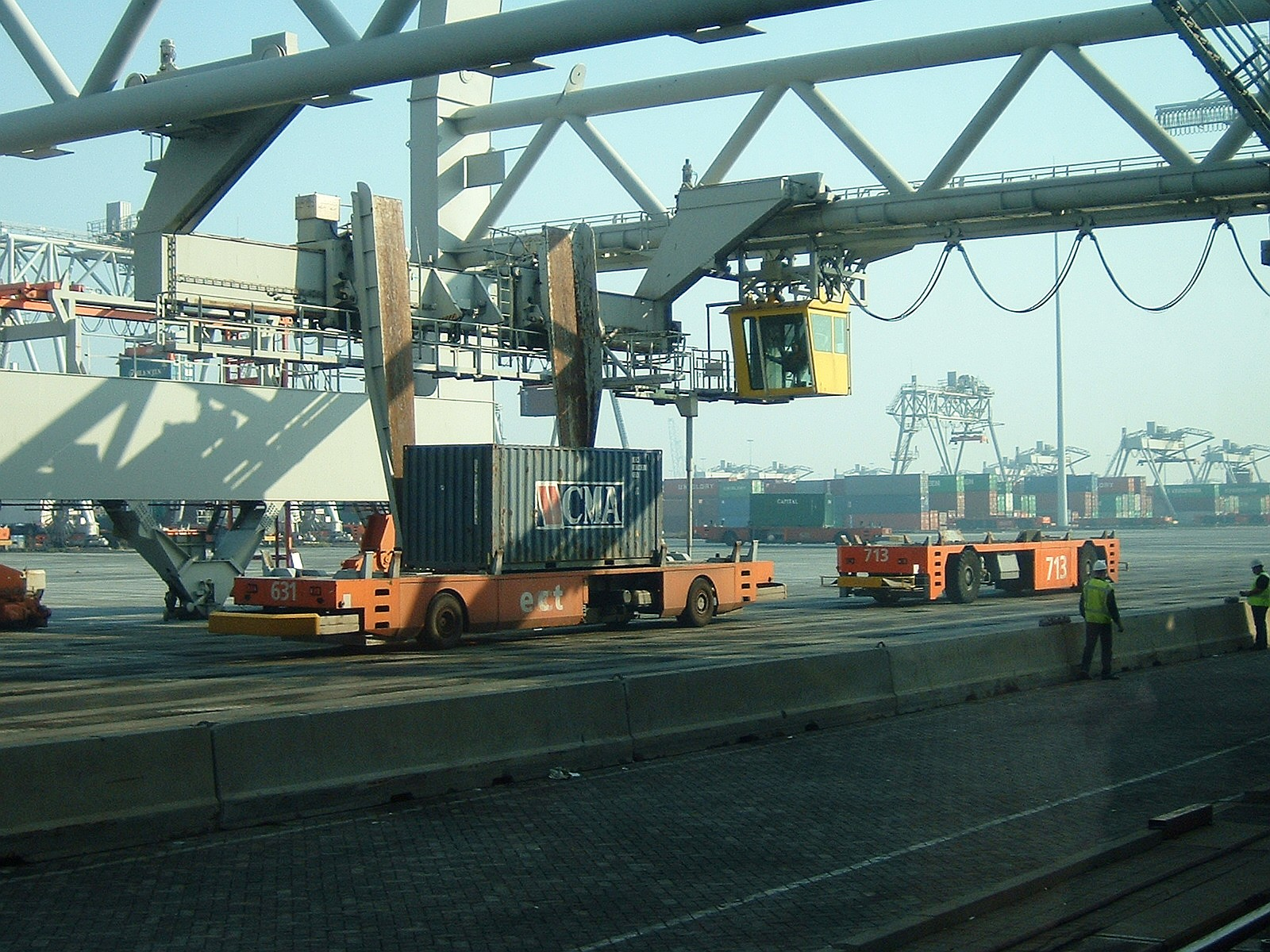
Container terminals showing a container being loaded onto an unmanned automated guided vehicle

AGVs are used to move sea containers in some port container terminals. The main benefits are reduced labour costs and a more reliable (less variable) performance. This use of AGVs was pioneered in 1993 at the Port of Rotterdam in the Netherlands. By 2014 there were 20 automated or semi-automated port container terminals around the world which use either or both automated-guideway vehicles and automated-stacking-cranes. The original AGVs used diesel power with either hydraulic or electric drives. However more AGV use battery power and automated battery swap, which reduces emissions and lowers refueling costs but cost more to purchase and have shorter range.

== Primary application industries ==
Efficient, cost effective movement of materials is an important, and common element in improving operations in many manufacturing plants and warehouses. Because automatic guided vehicles (AGVs) can deliver efficient, cost effective movement of materials, AGVs can be applied to various industries in standard or customized designs to best suit an industry's requirements. Industries currently utilizing AGVs include (but are not limited to):

=== Pharmaceutical ===
AGVs are a preferred method of moving materials in the pharmaceutical industry. Because an AGV system tracks all movement provided by the AGVs, it supports process validation and current good manufacturing practice (cGMP).

=== Chemical ===
AGVs deliver raw materials, move materials to curing storage warehouses, and provide transportation to other processing cells and stations. Common industries include rubber, plastics, and specialty chemicals.

=== Manufacturing ===
AGVs are often used in general manufacturing of products. AGVs can typically be found delivering raw materials, transporting work-in process, moving finished goods, removing scrap materials, and supplying packaging materials.

=== Automotive ===
AGV installations are found in Stamping Plants, Power Train (Engine and Transmission) Plants, and Assembly Plants delivering raw materials, transporting work-in process, and moving finished goods. AGVs are also used to supply specialized tooling which must be changed.

=== Paper and print ===
AGVs can move paper rolls, pallets, and waste bins to provide all routine material movement in the production and warehousing (storage/retrieval) of paper, newspaper, printing, corrugating, converting, and plastic film.

=== Food and beverage ===
AGVs can be applied to move materials in food processing (such as the loading of food or trays into sterilizers) and at the "end of line," linking the palletizer, stretch wrapper, and the warehouse. AGVs can load standard, over-the-road trailers with finished goods, and unload trailers to supply raw materials or packaging materials to the plant. AGVs can also store and retrieve pallets in the warehouse.

=== Hospital ===
AGVs are becoming increasingly popular in the healthcare industry for efficient transport, and are programmed to be fully integrated to automatically operate doors, elevators/lifts, cart washers, trash dumpers, etc. AGVs typically move linens, trash, regulated medical waste, patient meals, soiled food trays, and surgical case carts.

=== Warehousing ===
AGVs used in Warehouses and Distribution Centers logically move loads around the warehouses and prepare them for shipping/loading or receiving or move them from an induction conveyor to logical storage locations within the warehouse. Often, this type of use is accompanied by customized warehouse management software. To avoid damage to fragile goods, AGVs are preferred in warehouses that handle fragile items since human errors are reduced to almost zero. Warehouses with hazardous goods have primarily adopted this technology as they can operate in extreme conditions like passing through freezers.

An Automated Guided Vehicle (AGV) is a mobile robot used to transport goods in a warehouse or distribution centre, without human operators intervening in the job. AGVs have been widely used in logistics companies and global B2B platforms to improve efficiency in high-volume operations.

With “goods-to-person” models, large fleets of AGVs can be deployed in intelligent logistics parks on major platforms to sort, pick and move parcels, away from humans that typically perform these essential tasks. AGVs have been implemented in many B2B, logistics and delivery fulfilment centres to optimise order picking and decrease picker travel time. AGVs are used to bring agility to a distribution centre when it comes to pallet handling, stock control, and automated processes.

Labour shortages, increased e-commerce demand and 24/7 scalability are factors identified as key drivers; this makes AGVs a workforce multiplier as they decrease manual handling within the workplace, thereby also lowering error rates, boosting throughput, and increasing safety. They are also designed to integrate with warehouse management systems (WMS) to facilitate seamless coordination of moving goods from the warehouse and help reduce lead times and provide an omnichannel fulfilment system

Market analyses forecast solid growth in the logistics and warehousing sectors due to trends and projects on automation and Industry. Although there are initial costs and integration challenges with the use of AGVs, the benefits of such systems have measurable positive impacts in terms of increased productivity, reduced operating costs and operational flexibility in dynamic work environments. AGV system allows logistics and global B2B platforms to ensure and have an efficient, resilient warehouses that meet today's supply chain requirements.

=== Theme parks ===
In recent years, the theme park industry has begun using AGVs for rides. One of the earliest AGV ride systems was for Epcot's Universe of Energy, opened in 1982. The ride used wired navigation to drive the 'Traveling Theatre' through the ride. Many rides use wired navigation, especially when employees must frequently walk over the ride path such as at (the now-closed attraction) The Great Movie Ride at Disney's Hollywood Studios. Another ride at Hollywood Studios that uses wired navigation is The Twilight Zone Tower of Terror, a combined drop tower/dark ride. The elevator cars are AGVs that lock into place inside separate vertical motion cabs to move vertically. When it reaches a floor requiring horizontal movement, the AGV unlocks from the vertical cab and drives itself out of the elevator.

A recent trend in theme parks is a so-called trackless ride system, AGV rides that use LPS, Wi-Fi, or RFID to move around. The advantage of this system is that the ride can execute seemingly random movements, giving a different ride experience each time.

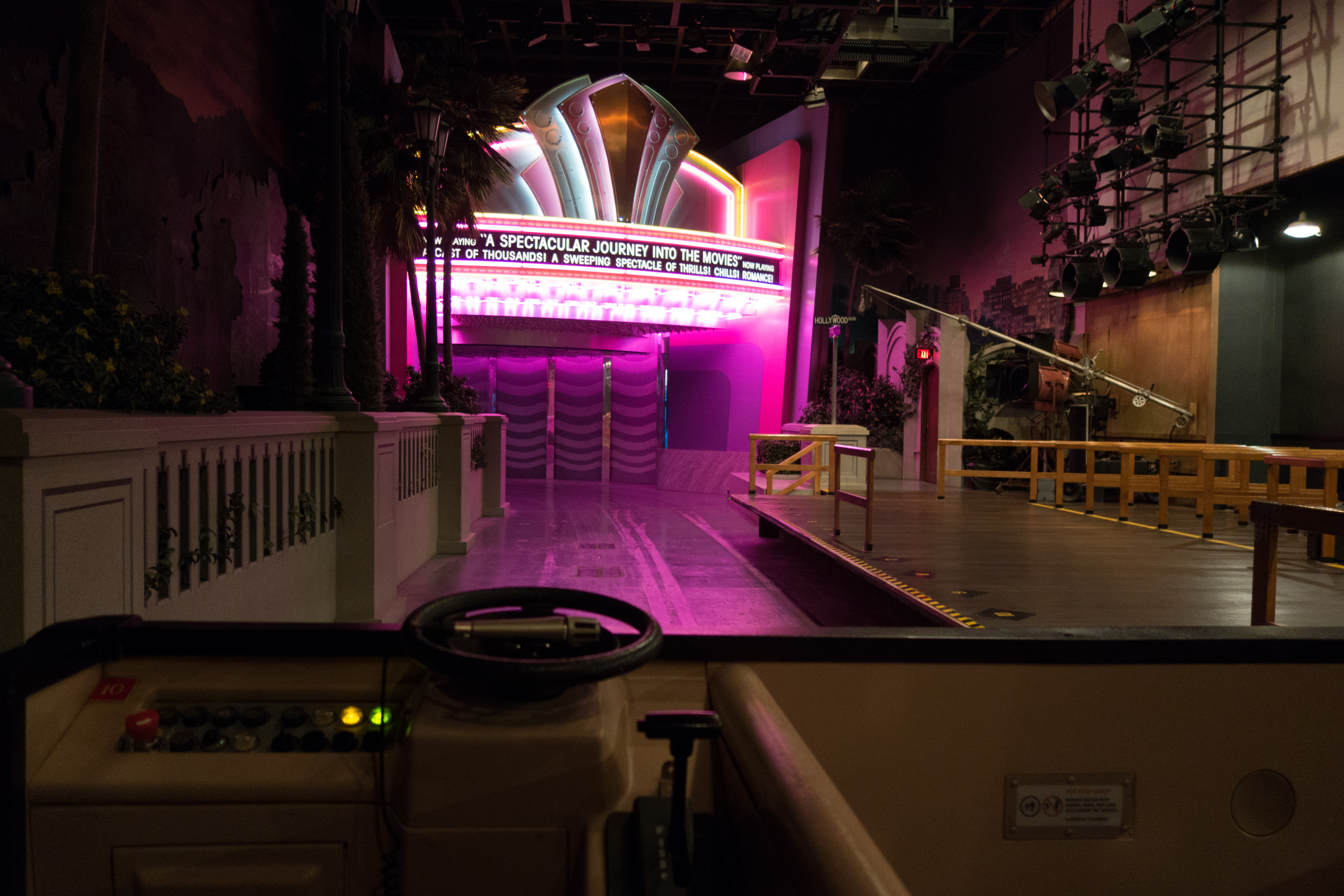
The view from a ride vehicle on The Great Movie Ride, showing the ride path and limited driving controls

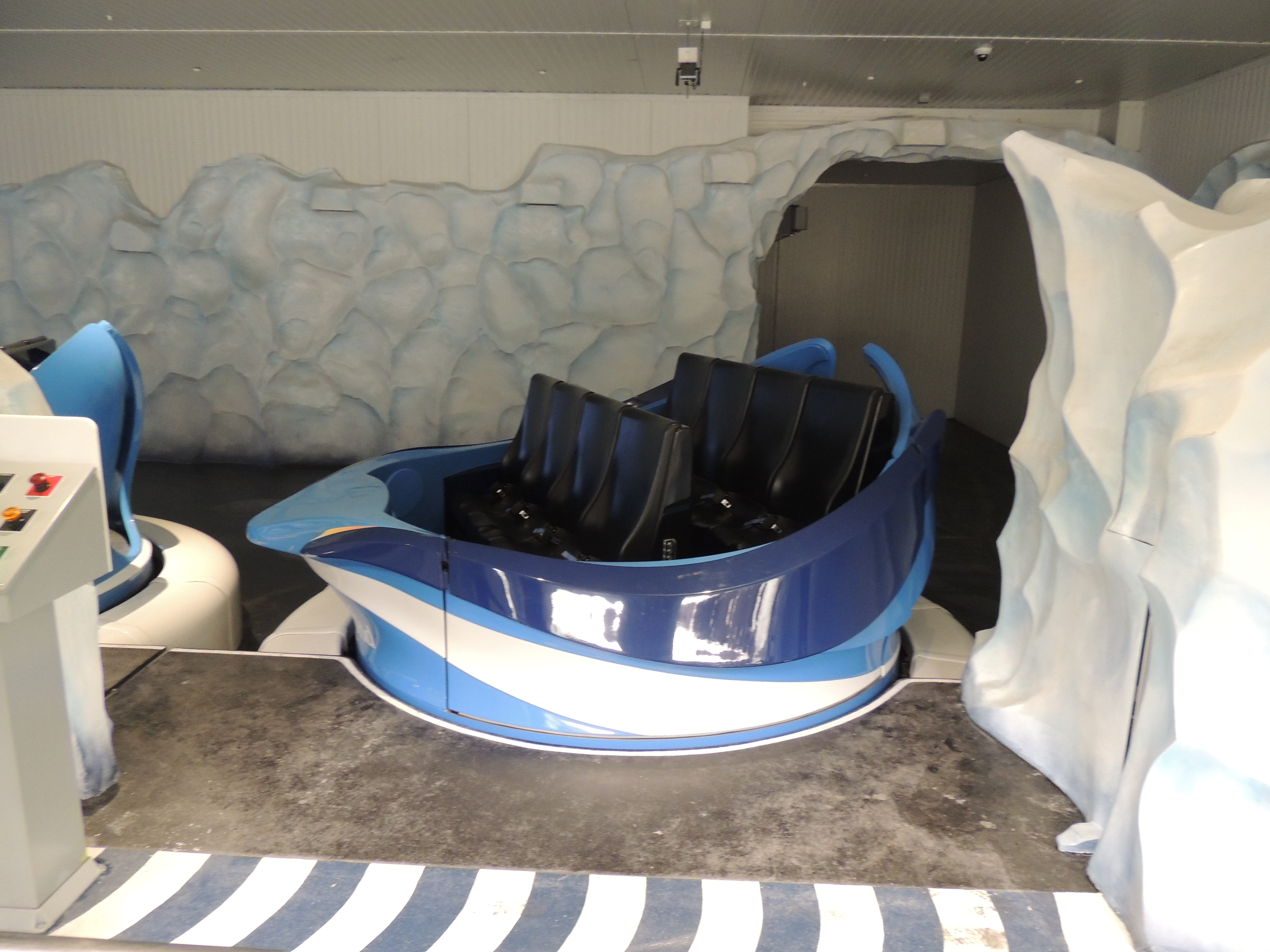
A ride vehicle docked at the station at Antarctica: Empire of the Penguin

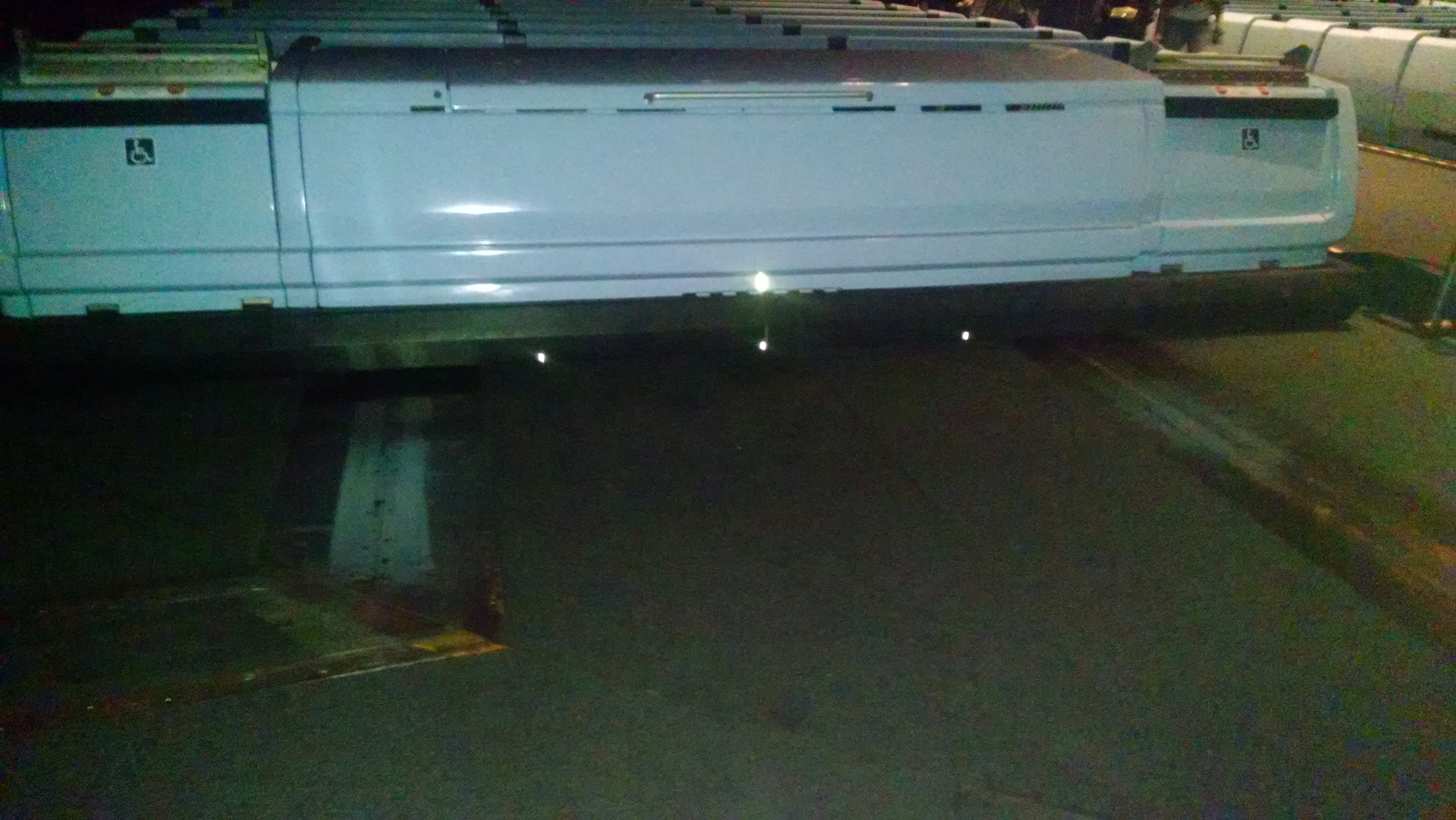
A ride vehicle (in its turntable station) at the Universe of Energy pavilion, showing the guide wire pathways

== Battery charging ==
AGVs utilize a number of battery charging options. Each option is dependent on the user's preference.

=== Battery swap ===
Battery swap technology requires an operator to manually remove the discharged battery from the AGV and place a fully charged battery in its place after approximately 8–12 hours (about one shift) of operation. 5–10 minutes is required to perform this with each AGV in the fleet.

=== Automatic and opportunity charging ===
Automatic and opportunity battery charging allows for continuous operation. On average an AGV charges for 12 minutes every hour for automatic charging and no manual intervention is required. If opportunity is being utilized the AGV will receive a charge whenever the opportunity arises. When a battery pack gets to a predetermined level, the AGV will finish its current job before it goes to the charging station.

=== Automatic battery swap ===
Automatic battery swap is an alternative to manual battery swap. It might require an additional piece of automation machinery, an automatic battery changer, to the overall AGV system. AGVs will pull up to the battery swap station and have their batteries automatically replaced with fully charged batteries. The automatic battery changer then places the removed batteries into a charging slot for automatic recharging. The automatic battery changer keeps track of the batteries in the system and pulls them only when they are fully charged.

Other versions of automatic battery swap allow AGVs to change each other's batteries.

While a battery swap system reduces the manpower required to swap batteries, recent developments in battery charging technology allow batteries to be charged more quickly and efficiently potentially eliminating the need to swap batteries.

== See also ==
- Automated guideway transit
- Automatic train operation
- List of driverless trains
- Unmanned aerial vehicle
- Industrial transfer cart
