= Ladle transfer car =

Type of rail car used for carrying molten metal

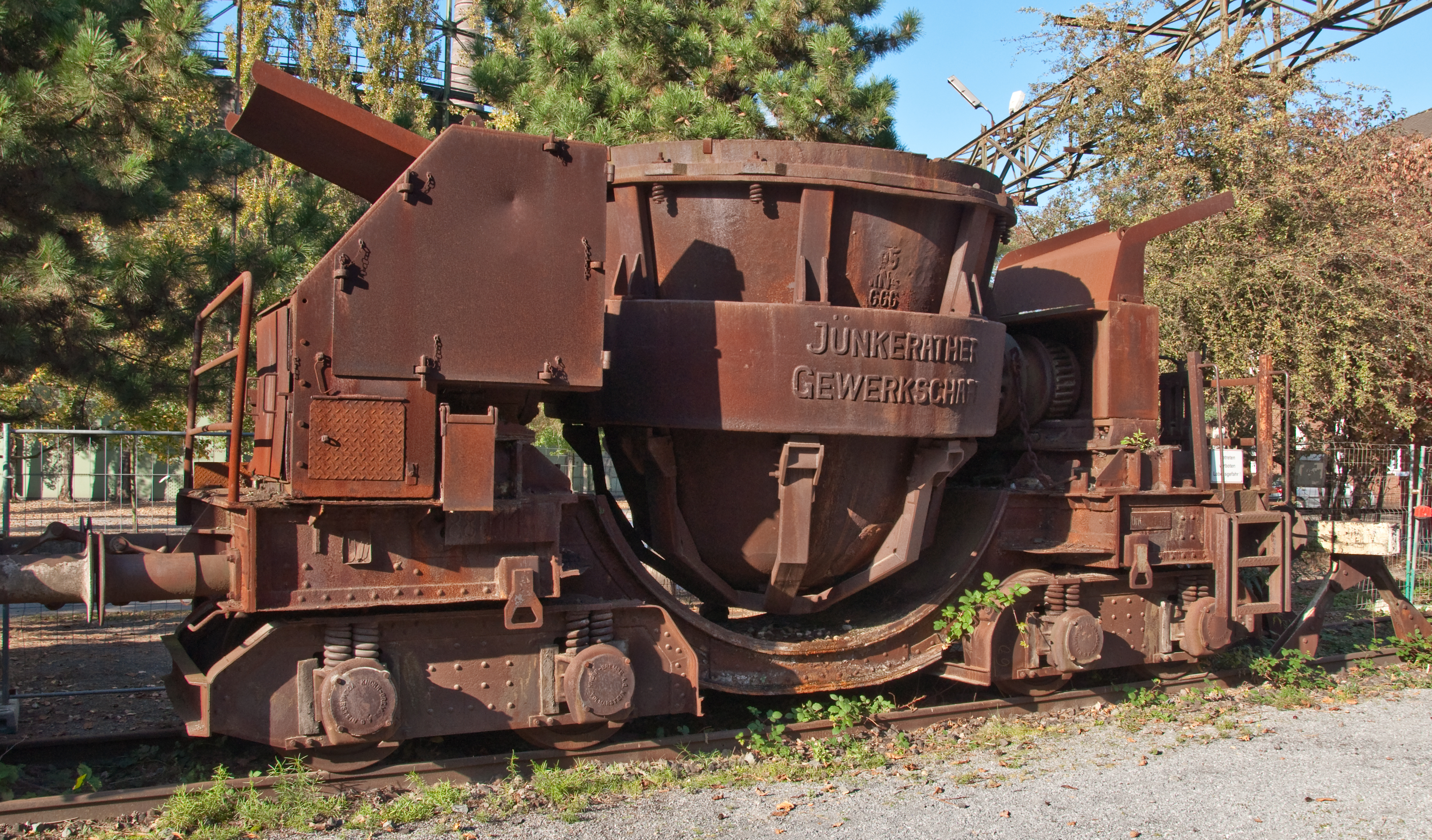
Ladle transfer car in Landschaftspark Duisburg-Nord

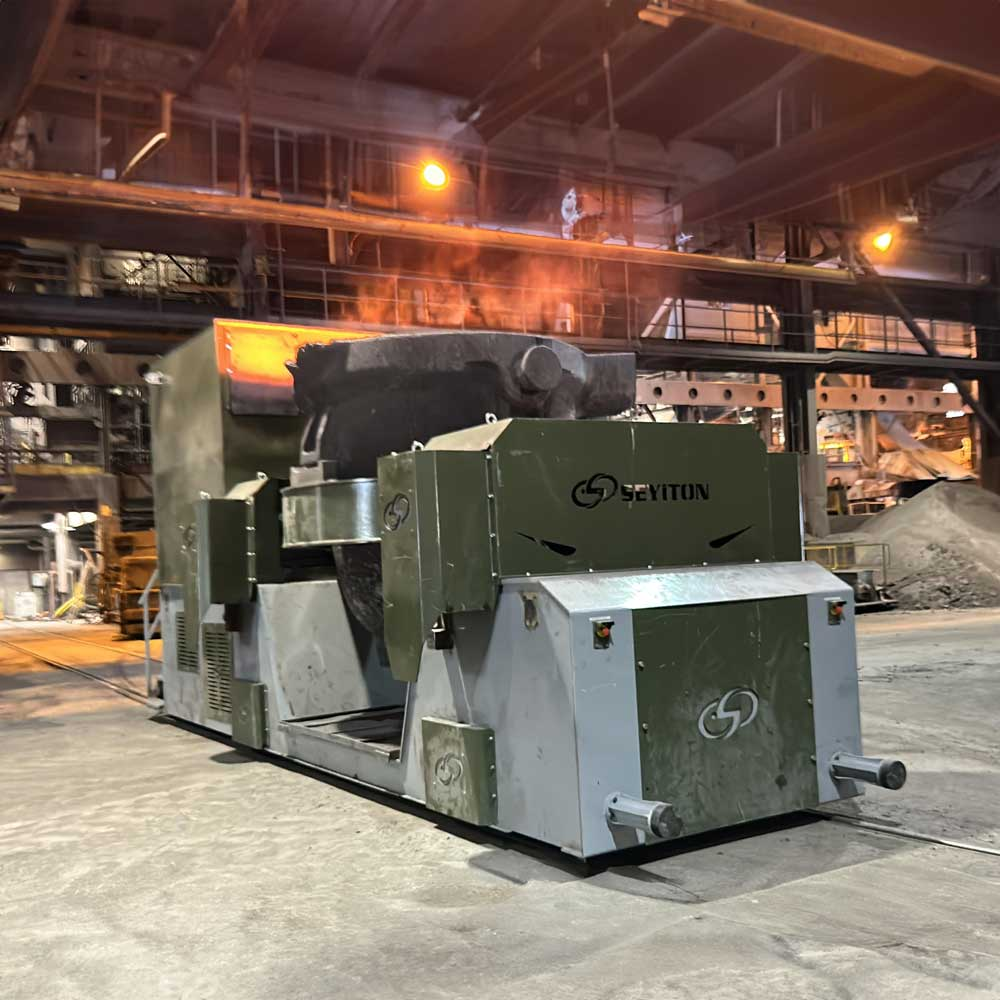
Ladle transfer cart in metal casting factory

A ladle transfer car is a material handling vehicle used in foundries. The railway car carries a metal ladle, typically torpedo-shaped (with two pointed ends), from one location to another for processing molten metal. It can also be called a molten steel transporter, a torpedo car, a bottle car, or a Tundish transfer car.

The ladle is placed on a railway car, but can be removed to allow the molten metal to be poured out.

== See also ==
- Forklift
- Industrial transfer cart
- AGV
