= Ladle (metallurgy) =

Vessel used to transport and pour out molten metals

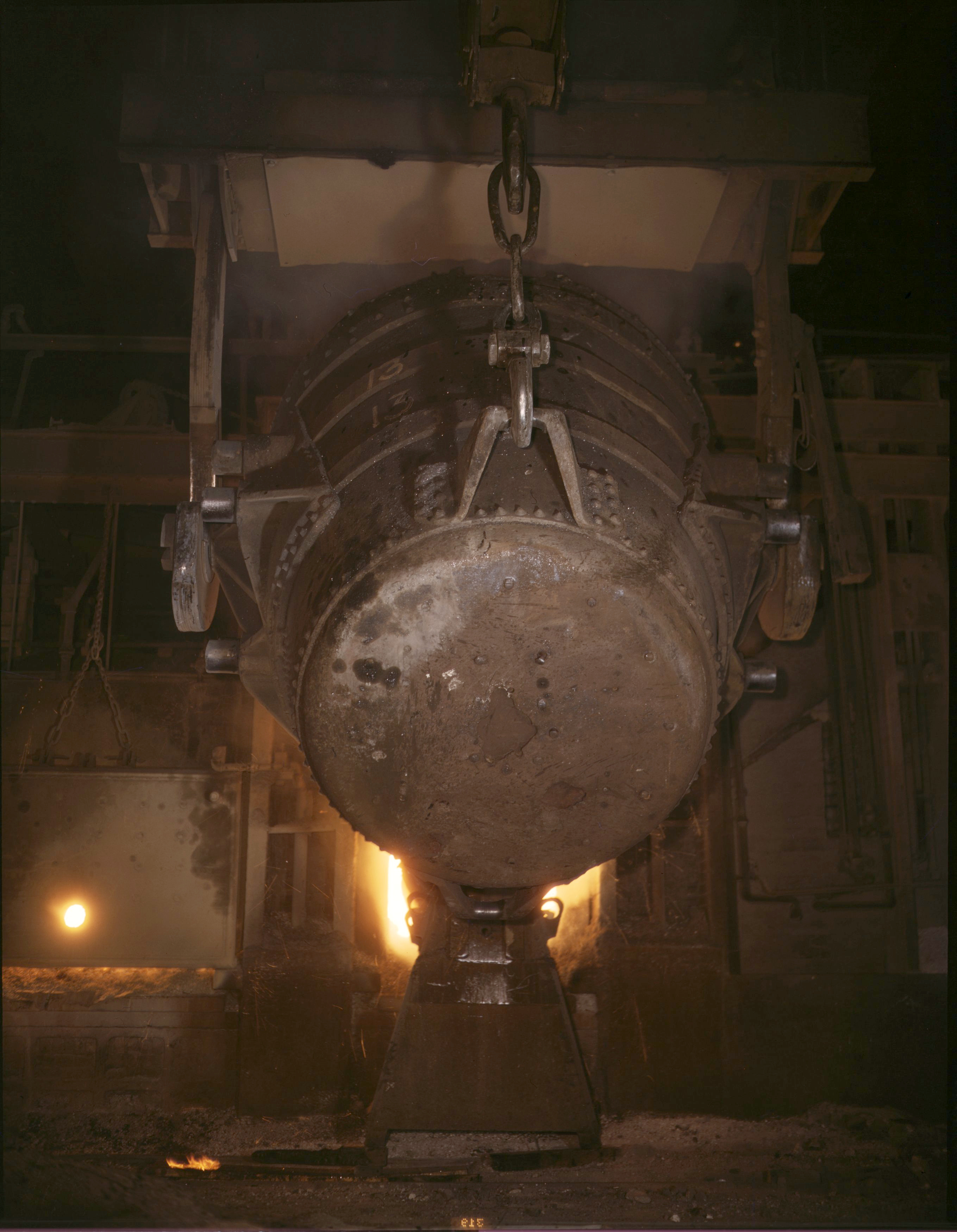
A ladle of molten iron being poured into an open hearth furnace for conversion into steel at Allegheny Ludlum Steel Corp., 1941

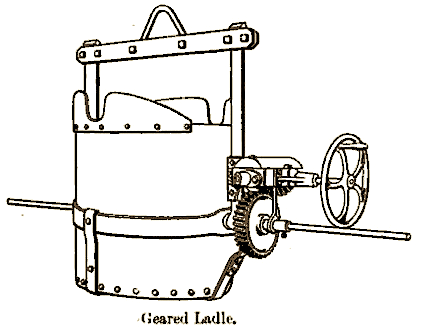
A gear driven ladle

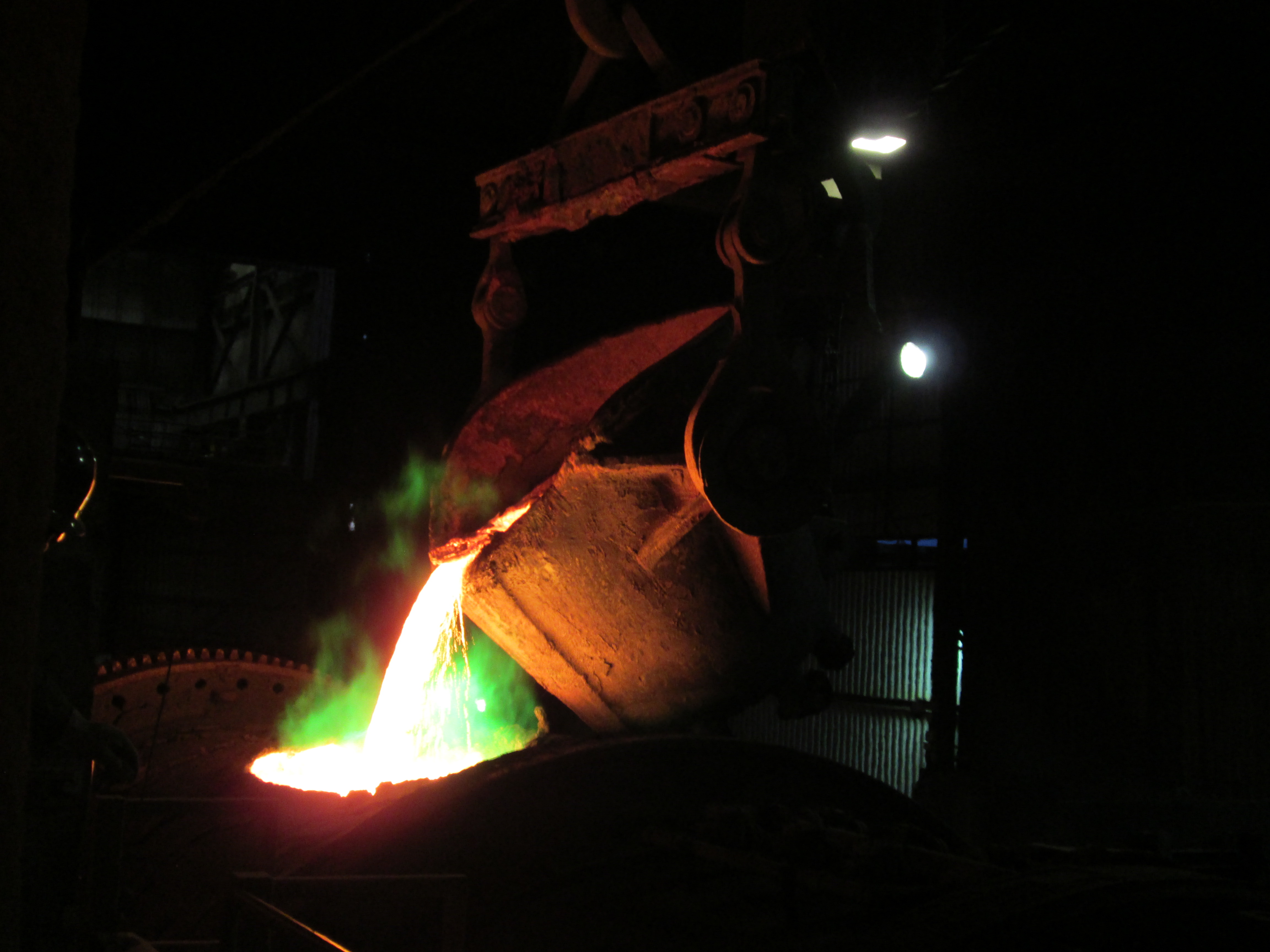
Copper ladle transferring blister copper into furnace for fire refining to produce copper anodes.

In metallurgy, a ladle is a bucket-shaped container or vessel used to transport and pour out molten metals. Ladles are often used in foundries and range in size from small hand-carried vessels that resemble a kitchen ladle and hold 20 kilograms (44 lb) to large steelmill ladles that hold up to 300 tonnes (295 long tons; 331 short tons). Many non-ferrous foundries also use ceramic crucibles for transporting and pouring molten metal and will also refer to these as ladles.

== Types ==
The basic term is often prefixed to define the actual purpose of the ladle. The basic ladle design can therefore include many variations that improve the usage of the ladle for specific tasks. For example:

- Casting ladle: a ladle used to pour molten metal into moulds to produce the casting.
- Transfer ladle: a ladle used to transfer a large amount of molten metal from one process to another. Typically a transfer ladle will be used to transfer molten metal from a primary melting furnace to either a holding furnace or an auto-pour unit.
- Treatment ladle: a ladle used for a process to take place within the ladle to change some aspect of the molten metal. A typical example being to convert cast iron to ductile iron by the addition of various elements into the ladle.

Unless the ladle is to be used with alloys that have very low temperature melting point, the ladle is also fitted with a refractory lining. It is the refractory lining that stops the steel vessel from suffering damage when the ladle is used to transport metals with high melting temperatures that, if the molten metal came in direct contact with the ladle shell, would rapidly melt through the shell. Refractory lining materials come in many forms and the right choice very much depends on each foundry's working practices. Traditionally ladles used to be lined using pre-cast firebricks however refractory concretes have tended to supersede these in many countries.

Foundry ladles are normally rated by their working capacity rather than by their physical size. Hand-held ladles are typically known as handshank ladles and are fitted with a long handle to keep the heat of the metal away from the person holding it. Their capacity is limited to what a worker can safely handle. Larger ladles are usually referred to as geared crane ladles. Their capacity is usually determined by the ladle function. Small hand-held ladles might also be crucibles that are fitted with carrying devices. However, in most foundries, the foundry ladle refers to a steel vessel that has a lifting bail fitted so that the vessel can be carried by an overhead crane or monorail system and is also fitted with a mechanical means for rotating the vessel, usually in the form of a gearbox. The gearbox can either be manually operated or powered operation. (See the paragraph below for further details).

For the transportation of very large volumes of molten metal, such as in steel mills, the ladle can run on wheels, a purpose-built ladle transfer car or be slung from an overhead crane and will be tilted using a second overhead lifting device.

The most common shape for a ladle is a vertical cone, but other shapes are possible. Having a tapered cone as the shell adds strength and rigidity to the shell. Having the taper also helps when it comes time to remove the refractory lining. However straight sided shells are also fabricated as are other shapes.

The most common of these other shapes is known as a drum ladle and is shaped as a horizontal cylinder suspended between two bogies. Large versions, often having capacities in excess of 100 tonnes (98 long tons; 110 short tons) are used in steel mills are often referred to as torpedo ladles. Torpedo ladles are commonly used to transport liquid iron from a blast furnace to another part of the steel mill. Some versions are even adapted so that they can be carried on special bogies that can be transported by either road or rail.

== Pour designs ==
Ladles can be "lip pour" design, "teapot spout" design, "lip-axis design" or "bottom pour" design:

- For lip pour design the ladle is tilted and the molten metal pours out of the ladle like water from a pitcher.
- The teapot spout design, like a teapot, takes liquid from the base of the ladle and pours it out via a lip-pour spout. Any impurities in the molten metal will form on the top of the metal so by taking the metal from the base of the ladle, the impurities are not poured into the mould. The same idea is behind the bottom pour process.
- Lip-axis ladles have the pivot point of the vessel as close to the tip of the pouring spout as can be practicable. Therefore as the ladle is rotated the actual pouring point has very little movement. Lip-axis pouring is often used on molten metal pouring systems where there is a need to automate the process as much as possible and the operator controls the pouring operation at a remote distance.
- For bottom pour ladles, a stopper rod is inserted into a tapping hole in the bottom of the ladle. To pour metal the stopper is raised vertically to allow the metal to flow out the bottom of the ladle. To stop pouring the stopper rod is inserted back into the drain hole. Large ladles in the steelmaking industry may use slide gates below the taphole.

Ladles can be either open-topped or covered. Covered ladles have a (sometimes removable) dome-shaped lid to contain radiant heat; they lose heat slower than open-topped ladles. Small ladles do not commonly have covers, although a ceramic blanket may be used instead (where available).

Medium and large ladles which are suspended from a crane have a bail which holds the ladle on shafts, called trunnions. To tilt the ladle a gearbox is used and this is typically a worm gear. The gear mechanism may be hand operated with a large wheel or may be operated by an electric motor or pneumatic motor. Powered rotation allows the ladle operator to be moved to a safe distance and control the rotation of the ladle via a pendant or radio remote control. Powered rotation also allows the ladle to have a number of rotation speeds which may be beneficial to the overall casting process. Powered rotation obviously also reduces the effort required by the ladle operator and allows high volumes of molten metal to be transferred and poured for long periods without operator fatigue. Where the ladle is fitted with a manually operated gearbox, the type of gearbox most commonly used is the worm and wheel design because in most practical circumstances, and when correctly maintained it can be considered as "self-locking" and does not need an internal friction brake to regulate the tilting speed of the ladle. Other types of gear system can also be used but they have to be fitted with an additional braking system that can hold the ladle if the operator takes his hand off the hand-wheel.

Lip-axis ladles may also use hydraulic rams to tilt the ladle. The largest ladles are un-geared and are typically poured using a special, two-winch crane, where the main winch carries the ladle while the second winch engages a lug at the bottom of the ladle. Raising the second winch then rotates the ladle on its trunnions.

Ladles are often designed for special purposes such as adding alloys to the molten metal. Ladles may also have porous plugs inserted into the base, so inert gases can be bubbled through the ladle to enhance alloying or metallic treatment practices.

== See also ==
- Crucible
- Ladle transfer car
