= Transfer cart =

Small industrial vehicle

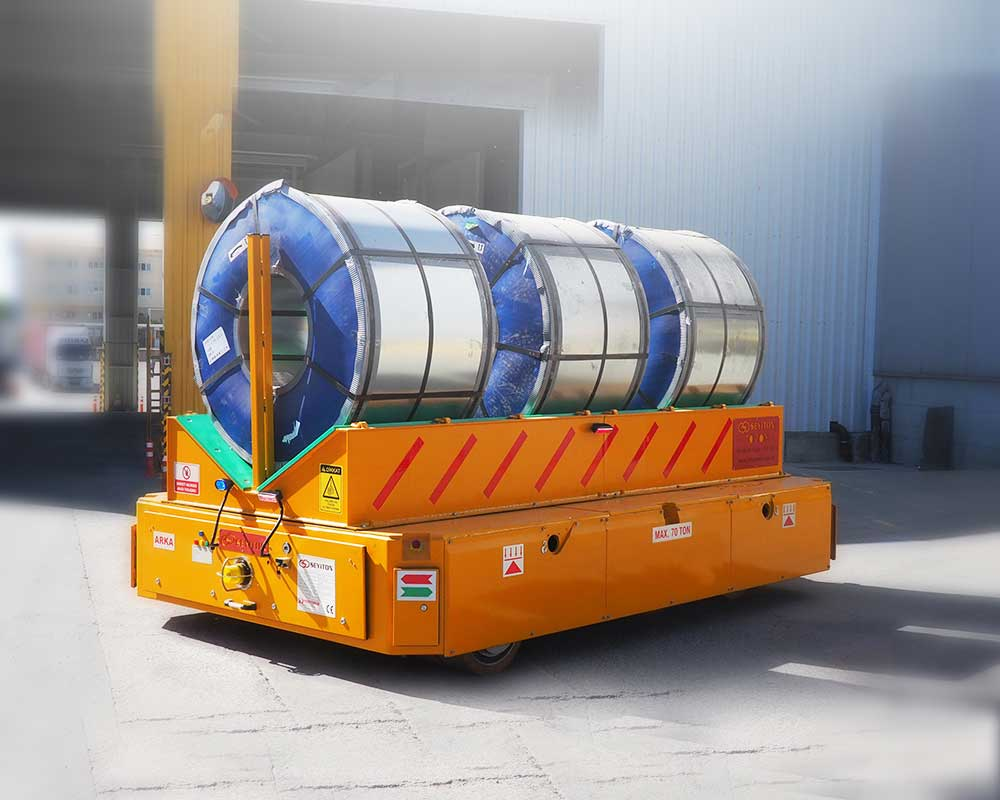
Coil transfer cart

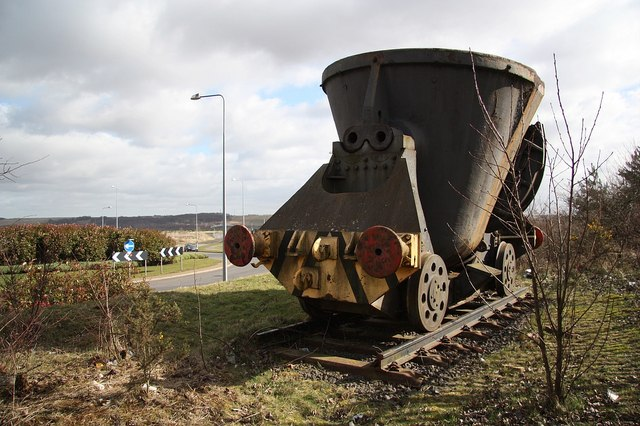
Slag pot transport cart

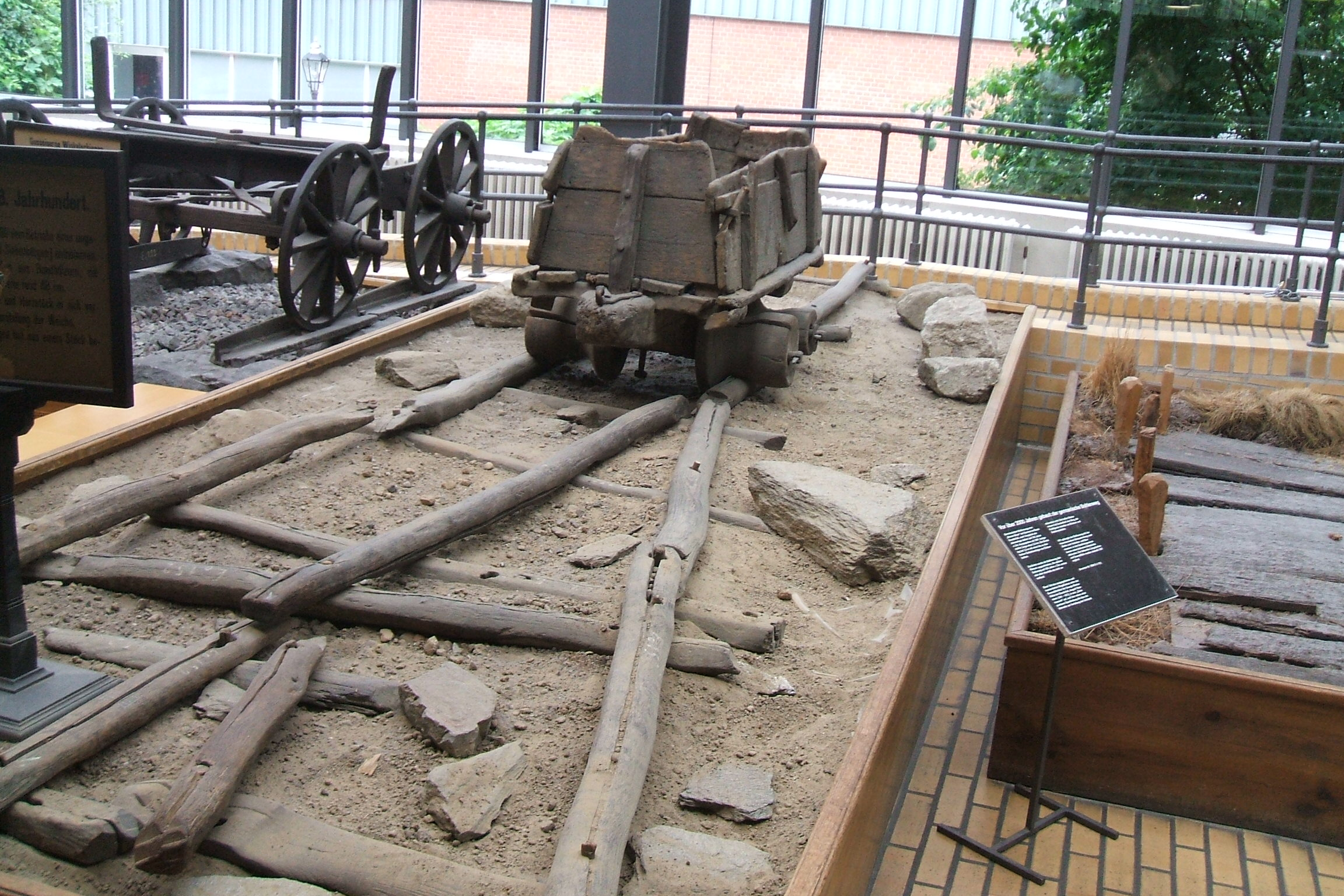
A wooden rail transfer cart from the 16th century

A transfer cart (sometimes called an industrial cart, industrial transfer cart, or factory trolley) is a specialized small vehicle designed to transport heavy loads within a manufacturing facility or between different work zones. Transfer carts may move freely on wheels, or may be installed on tracks.

Transfer carts are used in the same manner as forklifts, but have certain advantages in some situations. Transfer carts require fewer personnel and less specialized operator training than forklifts, and often have better maneuverability. However, they lack the ability to raise and lower loads over large distances, unlike forklifts.

== See also ==
- Forklift
- Ladle Transfer Car
- AGV
