= Antarctica: Empire of the Penguin =

Former ride at SeaWorld Orlando

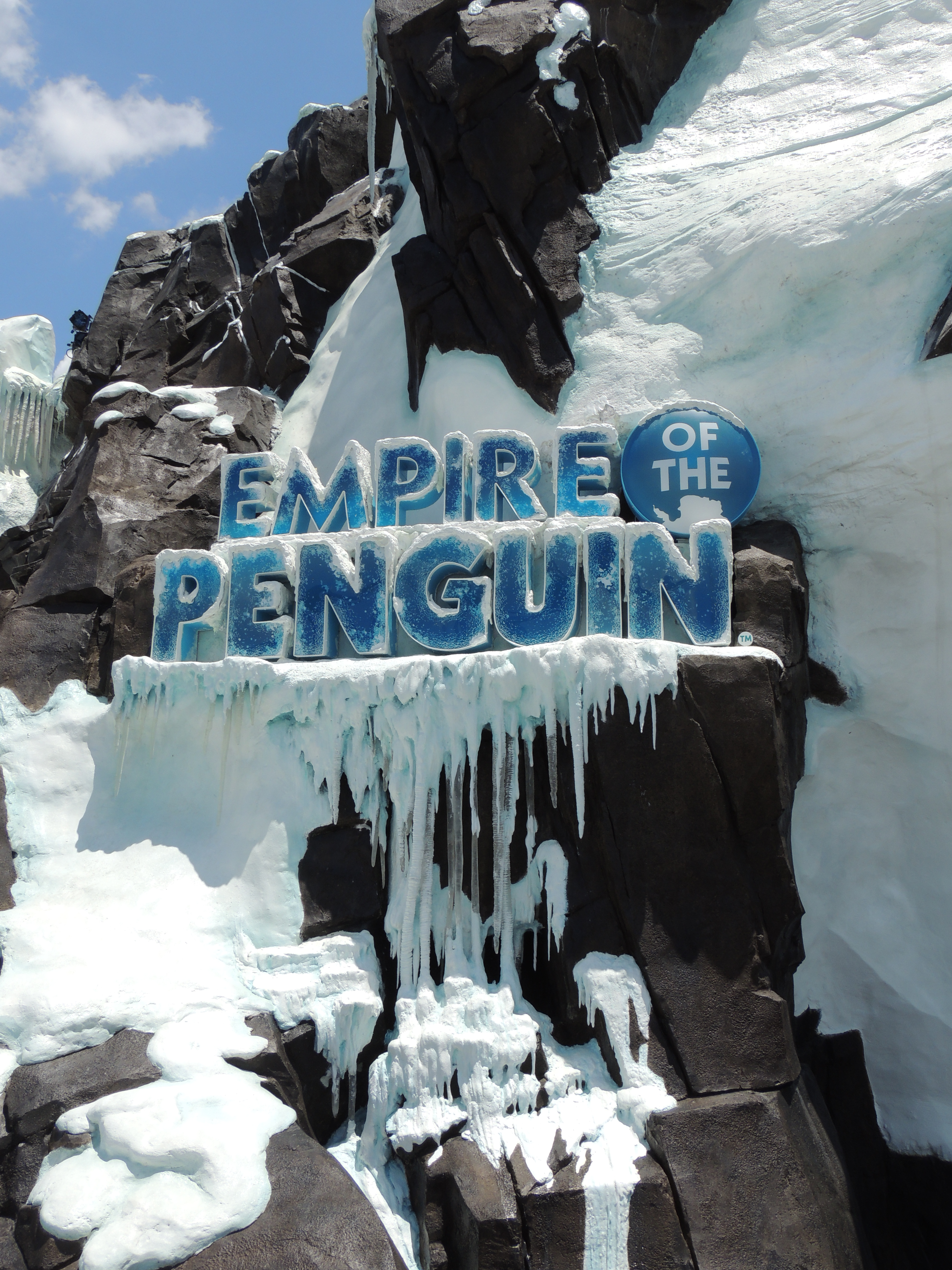
- Entrance

SeaWorld Orlando
- Area: Sea of Ice
- Coordinates: 28°24′42.8″N 81°27′35.5″W
- Status: Removed
- Opening date: May 24, 2013
- Closing date: March 16, 2020
- Replaced: Penguin Encounter, Friends of the Wild, and Antarctic Market Restaurant
- Replaced by: Penguin Trek

Ride statistics
- Attraction type: Motion-based AGV/trackless dark ride
- Manufacturer: Oceaneering International
- Theme: Antarctica
- Music: "Antarctica: One World, One Family" by Lauren Alaina
- Vehicle type: AGV/Trackless
- Riders per vehicle: 8
- Rows: 2
- Riders per row: 4
- Height restriction: 42 in (107 cm)
- Wheelchair accessible

Antarctica: Empire of the Penguin was a motion-based trackless dark ride at SeaWorld Orlando in Orlando, Florida. The ride featured a penguinarium as a post-show.

Announced in 2011, Antarctica: Empire of the Penguin opened on May 24, 2013. At the time it was the largest attraction at any United Parks & Resorts-owned park. As part of a campaign to promote the attraction, SeaWorld Orlando released a promotional video in July 2012. The ride and its surrounding themed area were generally well received by critics and the public at its opening.

The ride closed alongside the rest of the park due to the COVID-19 pandemic in March 2020, and did not reopen with the rest of the park several months later. It was replaced by the Penguin Trek roller coaster in 2024. Penguin Trek still retains the penguinarium as a post-show.

== History ==
=== Rumors and announcement ===
In August and September 2011, SeaWorld Entertainment filed trademarks for "Antarctica" to be used in a themed area, and "Empire of the Penguins" to be used for an amusement ride. This led to rumors that SeaWorld Orlando would replace its 1987 Penguin Encounter exhibit with a dark ride. A report by the Orlando Sentinel in October 2011 confirmed these plans, citing "government filings and interviews with people familiar with various elements". At the time, SeaWorld Orlando would not publicly reveal its plans.

On November 8, 2011, SeaWorld Orlando announced a multi-year expansion plan beginning with the opening of Turtle Trek in 2012, and Antarctica: Empire of the Penguin in 2013. Although further details of the ride were not released, creative director Brian Morrow said that it would be the coldest attraction in the world and would follow the journey of a tiny penguin. On April 24, 2012, the park revealed further details about the attraction: guests would ride in eight-person vehicles, choosing among two levels of intensity: "Mild" or "Wild". The surrounding area would also feature a new penguin habitat, restaurant, and store.

=== Construction & opening ===
The Penguin Encounter exhibit, Friends of the Wild, and Antarctic Market Restaurant closed on January 3, 2012. They were demolished in the first half of 2012, with vertical construction on the new ride beginning in July. Construction continued into 2013, with construction walls coming down one week before the attraction's opening. The attraction cost over $40 million.

On February 19, 2013, SeaWorld Orlando announced that "Antarctica: Empire of the Penguin" would open on May 24. The ride had no officially announced soft opening period, but it was opened for a select number of employees and their families and travel media content creators before its public opening.

On May 24, 2013, SeaWorld Orlando opened the attraction to the public. The opening drew thousands of guests to the ride, with some waiting more than four hours to board.

=== Closure ===
On March 15, 2020, SeaWorld Orlando temporarily closed due to the COVID-19 pandemic affecting the state of Florida. When the park reopened in June of that year, the adjacent penguin exhibit reopened, but the ride remained closed. Guests were able to watch the pre-show, but paths were diverted to lead them immediately to the post-show penguin exhibit, rather than to the ride's boarding area.

In late 2023, SeaWorld Orlando announced Penguin Trek, a launched roller coaster, as a replacement for the dark ride. Construction began in 2023, and Penguin Trek opened to the public in July 2024, retaining the penguin exhibits as a post-show.

== Ride experience and exhibit ==
Guests entered the queue in the Antarctica-themed Sea of Ice section of the park. Large groups of riders and non-riders were admitted into a pre-show room, where projections of an Antarctic landscape were blended with physical exhibits. In a narrated video, guests were introduced to a gentoo penguin colony in Antarctica, featuring a newborn penguin named Puck. After the pre-show, guests followed a path to a junction. Non-riders watched another pre-show before entering the post-show penguin exhibit. Riders chose a "Mild" or Wild" ride experience. They were then divided into groups of eight to board a ride vehicle at one of four stations. Riders were seated in two rows of four, and restrained by seat belts.

The vehicle traveled around an indoor Antarctic environment, spinning to view a variety of scenery and projection screens. The story introduced in the pre-show continues, with Puck venturing out into the sea. When he is underwater, Puck is chased by a leopard seal before resurfacing safely on land. The ride's theme song, "Antarctica: One World, One Family" by Lauren Alaina, was played as guests watched a live penguin habitat behind glass before the vehicle arrived at the unloading station.

Guests disembarked in an open-air penguin habitat with an air temperature of approximately 32 °F (0 °C). This exhibit had minimal barriers between guests and inhabitants, and was designed to allow guests to hear sounds made by the penguins.

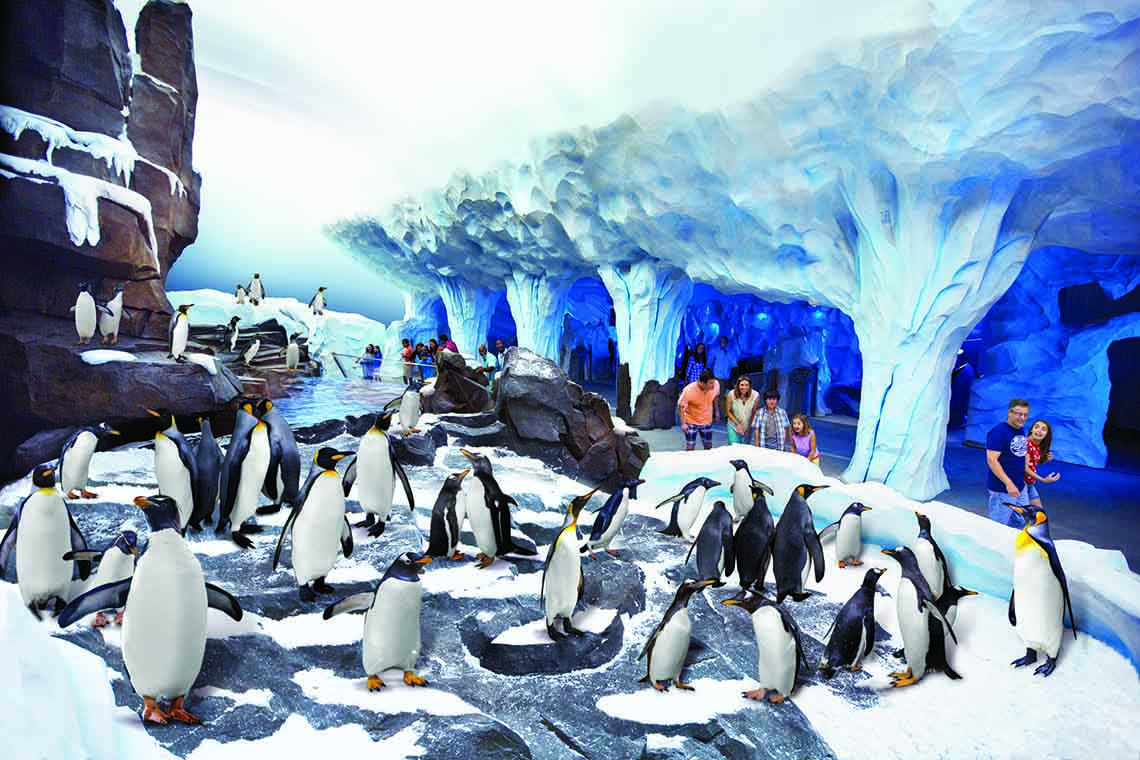
Penguin exhibit at Antarctia: Empire of the Penguin's conclusion

A total of 245 penguins and alcids lived in the exhibit. Species included gentoo, king, emperor, Adélie, and rockhopper penguins, as well as their Arctic counterparts, puffins, and murres. The park could change the lighting to emulate a sense of seasons for the penguins. A 20-foot (6.1 m) glass window allowed guests to see them in their 45 °F (7 °C) pool from an underwater viewing area. The entire experience took about 25 minutes. To minimize odors in the open-air environment, staff cleaned the exhibit several times daily and replaced the 20,000 pounds (9,100 kg) of snow each day.

== Themed area ==
The Antarctica-themed Sea of Ice is spread across 4 acres (1.6 ha) inside SeaWorld Orlando. A 50-foot-high (15 m) entrance archway is adjacent to the Sea Lion and Otter Stadium, and a smaller entrance is near the Journey to Atlantis ride. In addition to Antarctica: Empire of the Penguin, the themed area is home to several other attractions. A looping 45-minute soundtrack is played throughout the area. A "South Pole" is in the center of the area, and penguin carvings decorate the surrounding walls. Expedition Cafe, South Pole Beverages, and Glacial Collections sell food, drinks, and souvenirs, respectively.

== Production ==
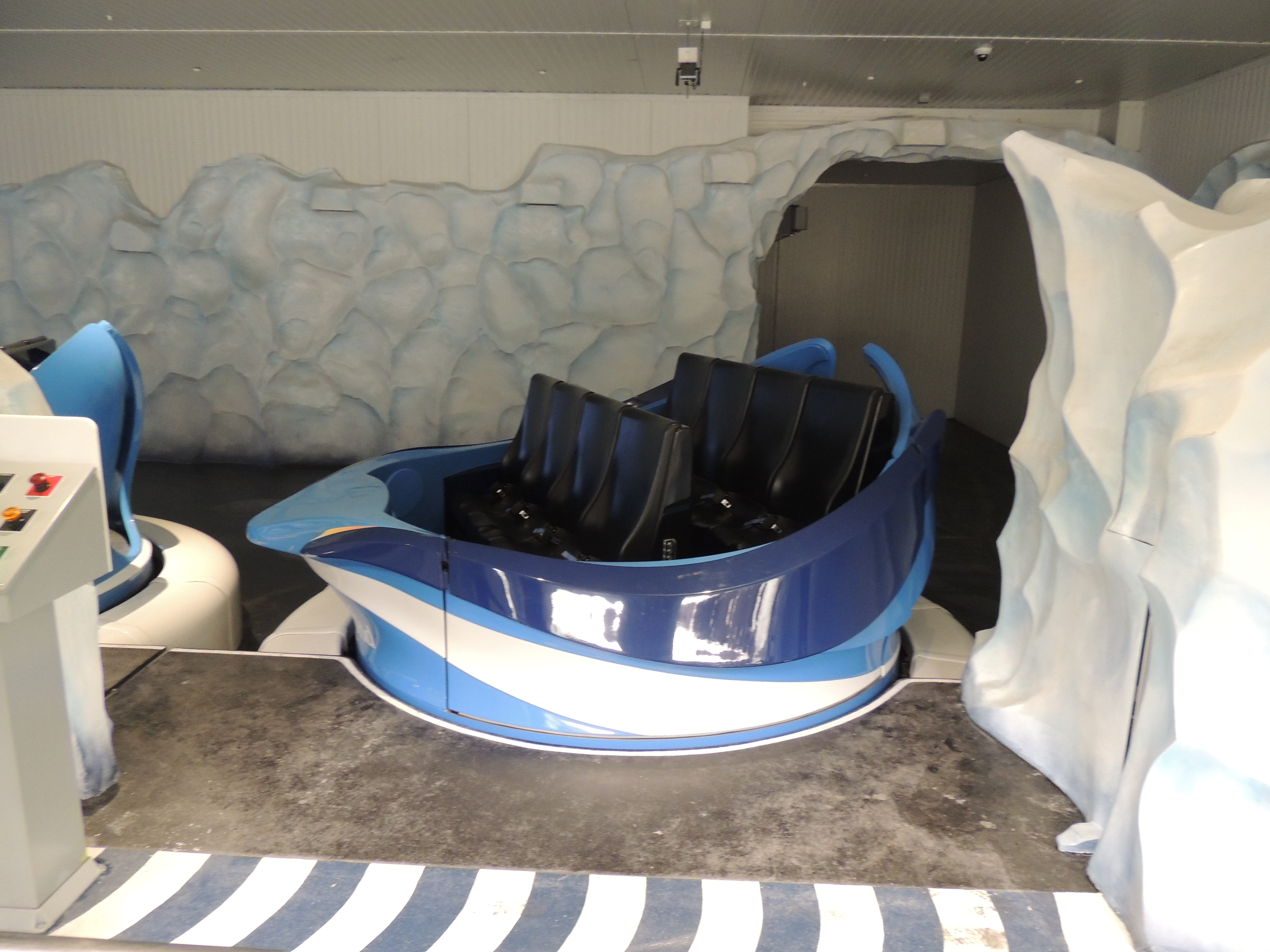
Antarctica: Empire of the Penguin ride vehicle docked in the station

=== Ride system ===
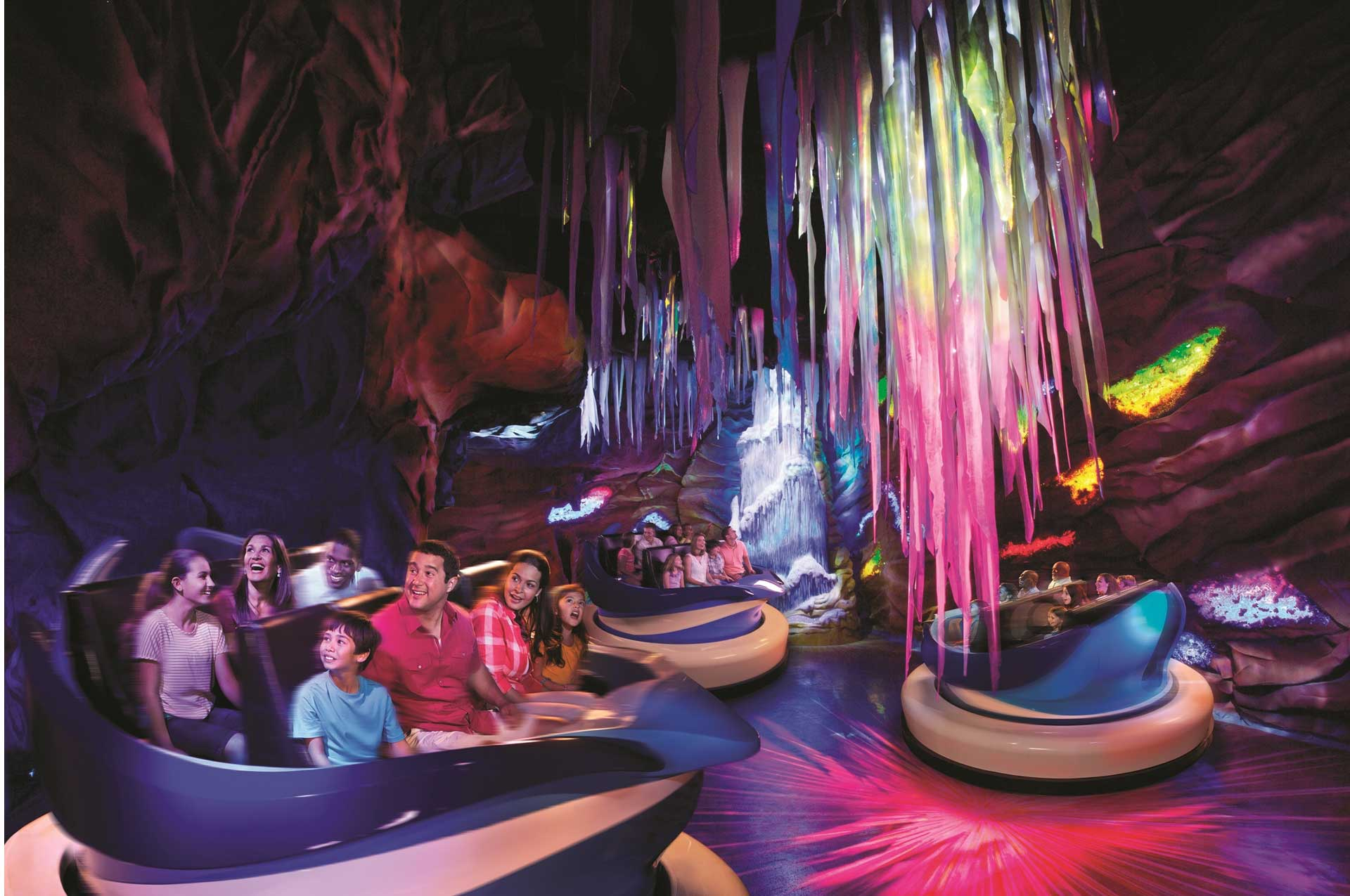
Riders in Antartica: Empire of the Penguin's "Rainbow Room"

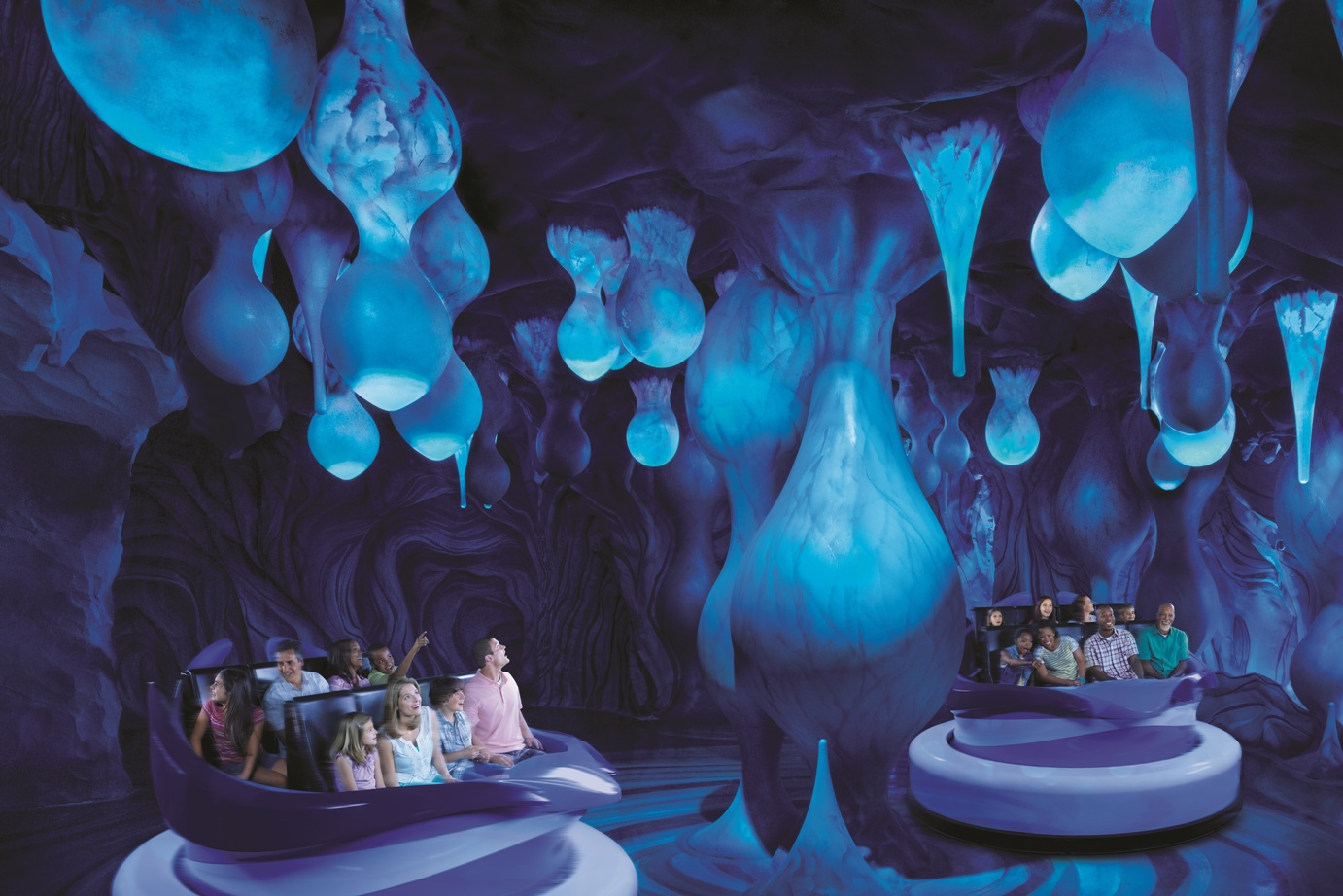
Riders in Antartica: Empire of the Penguin's "Blue Room"

Antarctica: Empire of the Penguin featured a prototype motion-based and trackless dark-ride system by Oceaneering International. The ride was the first of its kind in the world.

When the attraction was announced in November 2011, Oceaneering International had already developed a working prototype of the ride vehicle. The first concept art for the attraction was released in April 2012, featuring a circular ride vehicle capable of seating eight riders in two rows of four. On May 11, 2012, Oceaneering International filed a patent application for the ride's technology. At the November 2012 International Association of Amusement Parks and Attractions (IAAPA) Expo, SeaWorld Orlando and Oceaneering International revealed the ride vehicle to the public.

Each battery-powered vehicle, or AGV, is made up of two platforms. Riders sat on the upper platform, which provided three degrees of freedom. A lower platform provided omnidirectional lateral movement. Unlike previous ride designs, the trackless system and the wheel and motor configurations allowed movements diagonal to a rider's perspective. The vehicle used a dead reckoning system developed by Frog AGV to navigate, and can cross another vehicle's path. The vehicle's on-board controller communicated wirelessly with a central ride-system controller. Movement commands were issued by the ride-system controller, and executed by the vehicle's controller. A specially designed system allowed the vehicle battery to be quickly charged while docked at the loading and unloading platforms.

=== Marketing ===
SeaWorld Orlando announced Antarctica: Empire of the Penguin as part of the park's largest expansion in its history at that point. With 18 months between its announcement and its opening, the park wished to generate excitement for the ride. As part of this campaign, SeaWorld Orlando released a promotional video in July 2012 and a series of videos about the ride titled Behind the Freeze, featuring creative director Brian Morrow.

== Reception ==
Dewayne Bevil of the Orlando Sentinel said that "the hottest attraction in Central Florida theme parks this week is also the coldest". Bevil interviewed several park guests, and comments included "I thought it was really cool" and "it's beautiful", and some described it as better than the attractions it replaced. Barbara Nefer of Examiner.com said that guests would love Puck, the ride's central character. She preferred the Wild version of the ride, describing it as "actually still very family friendly" and saying that the exhibit was a "huge highlight" of the attraction. Robert Niles of Theme Park Insider agreed that the highlight of the attraction was the penguin exhibit. Niles described the dispatch procedure as crucial to the ride: "if SeaWorld can dispatch a quartet of ride vehicles every minute or so, as designed, fans will find this a fun ride". In a later article, Niles highlighted some guests' criticisms of the ride, describing it as "lacking an engaging story and not delivering enough on-ride views of the attraction's stars — SeaWorld's penguins". He argued that the park's promotions were too photorealistic, creating "expectations for an experience that the ride did not deliver, perhaps setting up many of those visitors for disappointment".

Lawrence Goldsmith of the Daily Mirror shared the sentiment that the penguins were the stars of the show. Goldsmith said that the ride options (Mild or Wild) allowed everyone from children to thrill-seekers to "enjoy the experience equally". Arthur Levine of About.com gave the ride three out of five stars, saying he felt conflicted: the animations were good, but the overall storyline was sparse; the ride system was intriguing, yet it was underutilized. He concluded by applauding SeaWorld Orlando for "taking the bold initiative to build a major-league attraction", but stated "the ride feels rushed and too short".

From a commercial perspective, the ride and the surrounding area's opening day saw guests waiting in line for more than four hours to experience the flagship attraction. SeaWorld Orlando had estimated queues of approximately half that time. Dennis Speigel of consulting firm International Theme Park Services expected attendance to increase between five and ten percent. Speigel speculated that this rise would be higher than if a single attraction were unveiled.

In November 2013, Oceaneering International won a Thea Award from the Themed Entertainment Association for "Outstanding Themed Entertainment & Experience Design" for the trackless ride system.

== See also ==
- 2013 in amusement parks
