= Intelligrated =

American software engineering company

- Type: Publicly held company
- Industry: Material Handling, Logistics Management
- Founded: 2001
- Founders: Chris Cole (CEO), Jim McCarthy (President & COO)
- Headquarters: Mason, Ohio, United States
- Area served: North and South America, Asia Pacific
- Website: www.intelligrated.com

Post-acquisition logo

Intelligrated, Inc. (a portmanteau of intelligent and integrated) was a material handling automation and software engineering company based in Mason, Ohio. In 2016, it was acquired by Honeywell, who made it a subsidiary and renamed it to Honeywell Intelligrated. 2017, Honeywell Intelligrated reported revenue of $1 billion. Honeywell Intelligrated has production and service locations in the United States, Canada, India, Mexico, Brazil, and China.

== History ==
Intelligrated was founded in 2001 by Chris Cole and Jim McCarthy, and has its headquarters in Mason, Ohio, a suburb of Cincinnati.

In 2002, Intelligrated acquired the Versa Conveyor product line from Conveyors Ltd. Later that same year, the company opened a new manufacturing facility in London, Ohio. By the end of 2008, Intelligrated employed more than 500 associates, with field operations throughout the U.S.

In 2009, as it purchased the North and South American operations of FKI Logistex, it grew to 1,500 associates

In 2012, Intelligrated began operations in São Paulo, Brazil.

In August 2012, Intelligrated was acquired by Permira.

In August 2016, Honeywell completed its acquisition of Intelligrated in a transaction valued at $1.5 billion, with the company joining Honeywell's Safety and Productivity Solutions business group. Intelligrated was rebranded as Honeywell Intelligrated.

== Activities ==
Honeywell Intelligrated designs, builds and installs tools for automated material handling including case and pallet conveyors, IntelliSort sortation systems, Alvey palletizers, robotic systems, order fulfillment systems and advanced machine controls.
