= Veho Tech =

American logistics service company

Veho Technologies
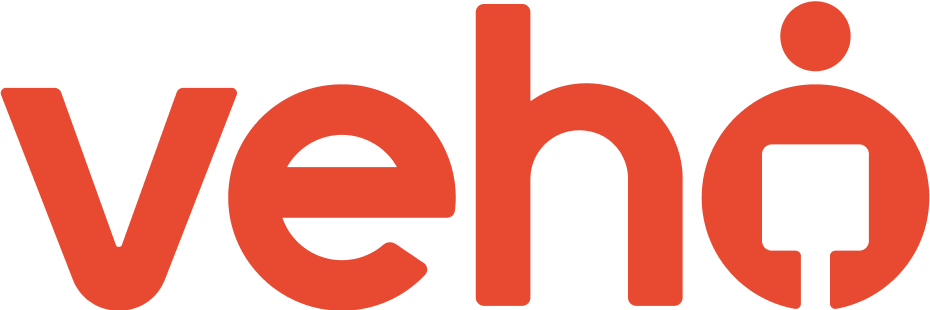
- Type: Private
- Industry: Logistics
- Founded: 2016; 10 years ago Denver, Colorado
- Founders: Itamar Zur; Fred Cook
- Headquarters: New York, U.S.
- Website: www.shipveho.com

Veho Technologies is an American logistics service company based in New York, U.S., providing last-mile delivery and return services. The company was founded in 2016, launching a mobile app matching gig-economy drivers with package deliveries in their local areas. The company's name "Veho" comes from Latin, meaning "to carry."

== History ==
Veho was founded by Itamar Zur in Boston, Massachusetts, where Zur was a student at Harvard Business School, The concept of Veho originated from Zur's experience with a meal delivery subscription service, that never delivered him a package he ordered. Zur then moved to Colorado in 2018, where Fred Cook joined as co-founder and chief technology officer.

Veho launched as an app enabling anyone with a vehicle to deliver packages, with a pilot program that delivered over 10,000 packages in Boston.

In 2017, while Zur was still at Harvard, Veho won the prize in the Harvard Business School's annual New Venture Competition.

In 2019, Veho graduated from the Techstars' Boulder accelerator program and received an investment of $1 million in the same year.

By 2021, Veho had added operations in Atlanta, Central Maryland, Milwaukee, Northern Virginia, and Philadelphia, while further expanding in Texas (adding Austin, San Antonio, and Houston) and Colorado (Fort Collins and Colorado Springs).

In 2022, Veho acquired QuikReturn, a reverse logistics company that was active in New York City and the surrounding areas.

== Products and services ==
Veho provides last-mile delivery and returns services for e-commerce companies. It employs independent workers for package delivery. Independent driver operators use the Veho app to select delivery routes and their pay. Drivers use their personal vehicles to fulfill next-day delivery deadlines. Using the company's mobile app, drivers scan and pick up packages at warehouses and then receive specific instructions for each stop, photographing the delivered packages. Package recipients can modify their delivery address, or contact the driver with specific instructions.

Multiple publications have described Veho as an Uber like service. Its services have been used by multiple companies, including HelloFresh, Misfits Market, Stitch Fix and thredUP.

== Operations ==
Veho now operates in 42 metropolitan areas, spanning the Northeast, Mid-Atlantic, Southeast, Midwest, Southwest, and Mountain West regions of the United States. It currently provides last-mile delivery, regional sorting, or doorstep pickups services in Atlanta; Austin; Baltimore; Boston; Charlotte, North Carolina; Chicago; Cincinnati; Colorado Springs; Dallas; Denver; Detroit; Fort Collins; Houston; Indianapolis; Jacksonville; Lakeland; Las Vegas; Miami; Milwaukee; Nashville; New York; Newark; Northern Virginia; Oklahoma City; Orlando; Philadelphia; Phoenix; Raleigh, North Carolina; San Antonio; South Florida; St. Louis; Tampa; Tulsa; and Waco.

== Financing ==
In December 2021, Veho became a unicorn after $125 million funding in Series A round of fundraising led by General Catalyst valued the company at $1 billion. Two months later, in February 2022, received an additional Series B funding round of $170 million led by Tiger Global and the SoftBank Vision Fund 2, increasing the company's valuation to over $1.5 billion.
