= Pallet collar =

Type of box for transport of bulk items

A pallet collar is a type of wooden packaging that works together with a classic wooden pallet or custom pallets.

The main difference in comparison to a normal wooden box is the possibility to collapse a pallet collar when not in use. As such, pallet collars have helped solve a problem in logistics. Pallet collars have increased in popularity worldwide in the past 20 years, with approximately 20,000,000 new collars manufactured each year worldwide.

Each of the pallet collars is stacked on one another to form a box type of packing, but because of the convenient design they provide several important benefits that have high value in the storage and transportation industry.

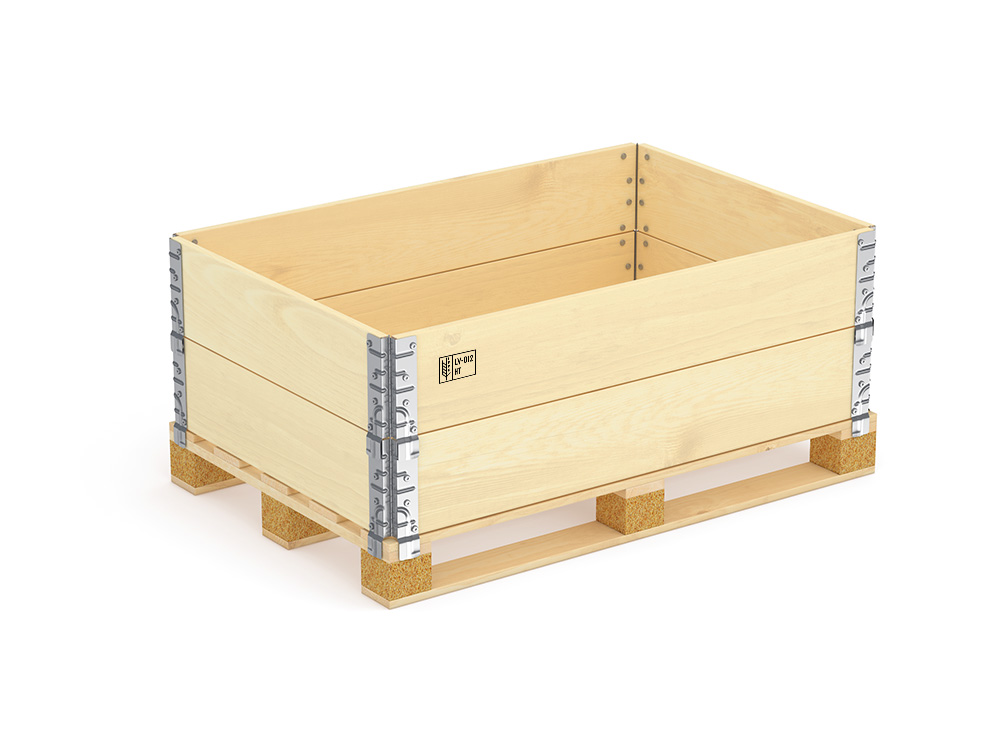
Pallet collar

== Overview ==
With the growing popularity of containerized transportation by sea and land, there was an increased use of classic wooden pallets. To enhance transportation options for a wider range of products, pallet collars were introduced.

== Design ==
A single pallet collar consists of four or six wooden boards (plastic boards can also be used) and four or six metallic hinges that are used to hold the boards together. These hinges allow every pallet collar to collapse in order to save space, which is the main difference between it and other boxes.

Pallet collars work together with classic and different types of pallets.

== Benefits of pallet collars ==
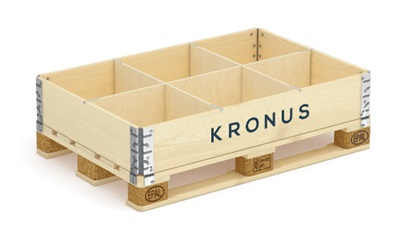
Pallet collar dividers

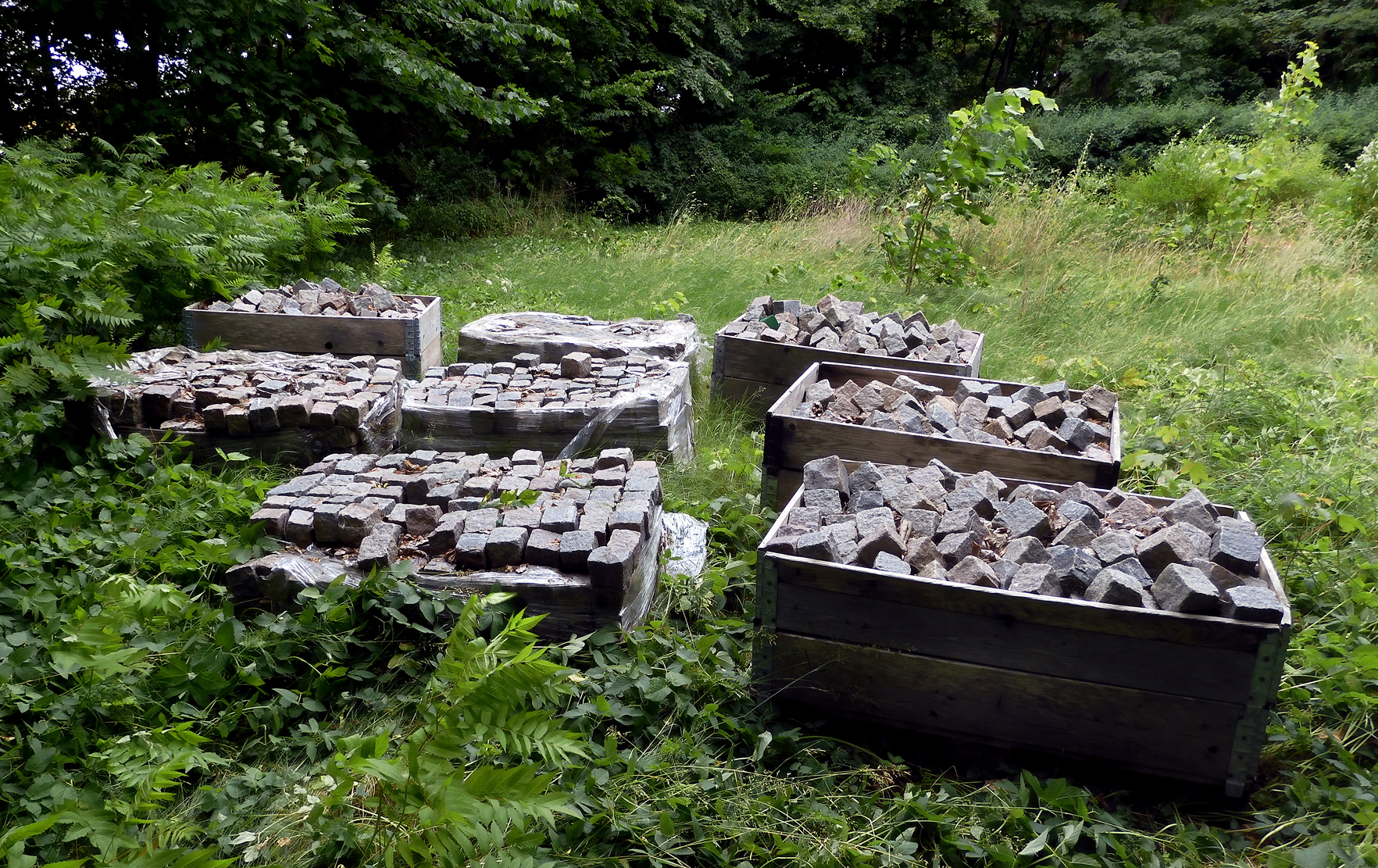
Pallet collars are practical for transporting heavy goods, such as paving stones .

When quality pallet collars are used in the right way it is possible to optimise space both in warehouses and when they are transported. They provide fast and easy handling and assembling. Also, the access to the goods that are stored is ensured to be faster and easier.

When pallet collars are not used and there are no products in this packaging it is possible to collapse them. In comparison to wooden boxes, these save up to more than 80% of space.

Different types of products can be stored on pallets without the pallet collars, but they are still used in order to ensure safe multi-level both shelf and non-shelf storage which ensures warehouse optimisation.

Using pallet collars makes it possible to store more types of products on pallets which would usually be stored in classic wooden boxes. For example, different friable products can be stored when a customised pallet is used.

== Downsides of pallet collars ==
If older or lower quality, pallet collars that are used for heavy and/or multiple objects can break which can lead to injury such as splinters.

And since most are made out of wood, they can be water damaged or get worn out very quickly if used for transporting heavy objects.

== Pallet collar construction ==
The way pallet collars are constructed ensures pallet collars that differ in heights and sizes in order can be used to adjust the needed capacity for different packaging needs.

=== Standardisation ===
Standard pallet collars are manufactured in four heights: 100, 200, 300 and 400 mm. By using the needed heights and combining them together it is possible to closely match every single package to particular products.

Three standard sizes are manufactured: 600×800 mm, 800×1200 mm and 1000×1200 mm. These standard sizes complement the majority of most commonly used standard pallets.

=== Customisation ===
In order to provide quality working conditions and efficiency it is possible to manufacture any custom height and size, which can provide precise packaging for any type of products.

Hinges can be customised too in order to provide better working conditions. For example, one side of the collar may open as a door, to provide easy access to stored goods.

=== Materials ===
Standard pallet collars are manufactured from plywood, which provides the necessary quality. OSB or plastic pallet collars are also often used. Each of the materials has advantages and disadvantages.

=== Avoiding risks ===
To form the needed packaging from pallet collars, only collars from one manufacturer should be stacked on one another. While the majority of manufacturers use standard sizes, minor differences can occur due to the technology used in manufacturing. Such differences can cause significant safety issues.

== Use in gardening ==
Pallet collars have become popular as a form of raised bed in home and allotment gardening.

== See also ==
- Pallet crafts
- Palletizer
- International Standards For Phytosanitary Measures No. 15 (ISPM 15) - regulation of wood packaging material in international trade
