= Vertical conveyor =

A vertical conveyor is a machine which can be used to move products automatically from one level to another. These machines are typically referred to as VRC's (Vertical Reciprocating Conveyors). However, the industry does not have universal standard terminology. These lifts can also be referred to as: material lift, parts lift, pallet lift, vertical lift, freight lift, utility lift, box lift, cargo lift, platform lift, baggage lift, vertical conveyor, and dumbwaiter. None of these terms use the word "elevator". This is because that term usually is used when referring to machines that transport people from one level to another and these lifts are not designed or legally allowed to transport people.

In internal logistics, there are various ways for getting product flows up or down. A solution which is often used is the deployment of incline or lowering belts. When placed at an angle in order to bridge a height difference, such belt conveyors also have the advantage of covering a certain distance. A disadvantage is the loss of much useful floor space as a result of the presence of the necessary supports for the belt conveyor. A bigger distance over a smaller floor area can be bridged using a product lift or a vertical conveyor. A continuous conveyor or a discontinuous conveyor can be chosen as a vertical conveyor. Continuous conveyors can take the form of a spiral conveyor, an L-shaped conveyor, a platform lift, or a product lift fitted with a fork.

== Discontinuous and continuous conveyors (Vertical Reciprocating Conveyors) ==
A discontinuous conveyor also called a reciprocating elevator, lifts the product on to a platform using a platform, roller conveyor, or belt conveyor and then moves the platform with the product to another level.

These lifts are specifically designed to move material vertically in a factory, warehouse, garage, or shipping/distribution center but are not designed or legally able to transport people.

All VRCs use a motor, which drives the lifting of a carriage either by cable or chain.

== Spiral conveyor ==
The advantage of a spiral conveyor is that it can be used with a minimum amount of control software since it is continuously running, unlike o-lifts or platform elevators that require controls to time the indeed of the products to coincide with the arrival of a platform. If a product has to be supported so that it is flat during transport, this will only be possible if the belt is wider than the product. The drive motor of a spiral conveyor does not always need to be controlled with a frequency regulator. Spiral conveyors can deliver three times the throughput of an o-lift or platform elevator due to the ability to run continuously. 3500-5000 shipping cases or cartons per hour are normal speeds for a spiral conveyor, while lifts handle these products with a throughput of only 1200-1500 CPH. Besides this the spiral conveyor is also a lot safer in operation and does not require safety fencing while o-lifts and platform elevators need to provide fencing in order to be safety compliant. Due to the moving platforms that could tear off a limb of not shielded by fencing. This makes platform lifts, if you include the fencing footprint, much larger in footprint than a spiral conveyor.

== L-shaped conveyor or platform lift ==
A continuous product lift or reciprocating elevator can be chosen for the upright transporting of products. Such lifts are found in two forms: an L-shaped conveyor or mat lift and a fork-lift. An L-shaped conveyor or platform lift is a goods lift in which the products lie on a support that is suspended between a number of chains. This means that there is a considerable risk of contamination (with oil or grease) where use is made of traditional chains. A possible disadvantage of such a lift is that it requires more control, but the area required is again appreciably less than with a spiral conveyor. The difference in height which is able to be bridged with only one drive motor is almost unlimited. When bridging a greater height, it is necessary with spiral conveyors to place several systems one above the other. Another disadvantage of an L-shaped conveyor or a platform lift is the fact that it is difficult to control the transfer of products on the intake to the system, with the incorrect receiving of a product being able to cause considerable consequential damage and with considerable additional costs to be expected as a result of lost production just as in the case of a spiral conveyor.

== Fork lift ==
A Fork lift can be arranged in more ways than an L-shaped conveyor or a platform lift and a spiral conveyor. A fork-lift is a product lift which lifts products from a conveyor using a fork and then places them at a different level on another conveyor. Such a fork-lift makes it possible to introduce or remove products at an angle of 90 degrees. As a result, the number of possible input and output combinations is somewhat larger. Because of the possibility of sliding conveyors in or out of the lift, a fork-lift can also be used as a vertical sorting system. With such a sorting installation, a product can be entered and removed at any level and a product can be lifted and lowered using one lift. The power and thus the energy consumption of the drive is considerably lower with a fork-lift than with other systems, since only the product weight needs to be transported and the forks maintain a balance between each other in the rising and lowering section. Another difference between a fork-lift and an L-shaped conveyor or platform lift is the complexity of the control. With an L-shaped conveyor or platform lift, input and output must be completely synchronous, whereas this is not necessary with a fork-lift. This ensures considerably simpler controls.

== Other Names ==
- Ambaflex
- Apollo
- Ryson
- material lift
- product lift
- case elevator
- incline belt conveyor
- elevator
- lift
- box lift
- spiral conveyor
- L-shaped conveyor
- reciprocating elevator
- S-conveyor
- Z-conveyor
- freight lift
