= Pallet =

Flat structure to transport goods

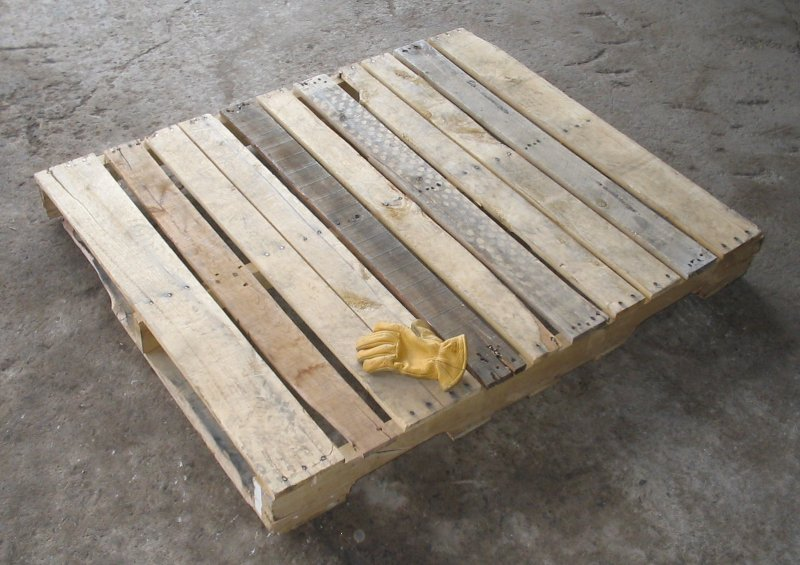
A classic wooden pallet, with a glove for scale

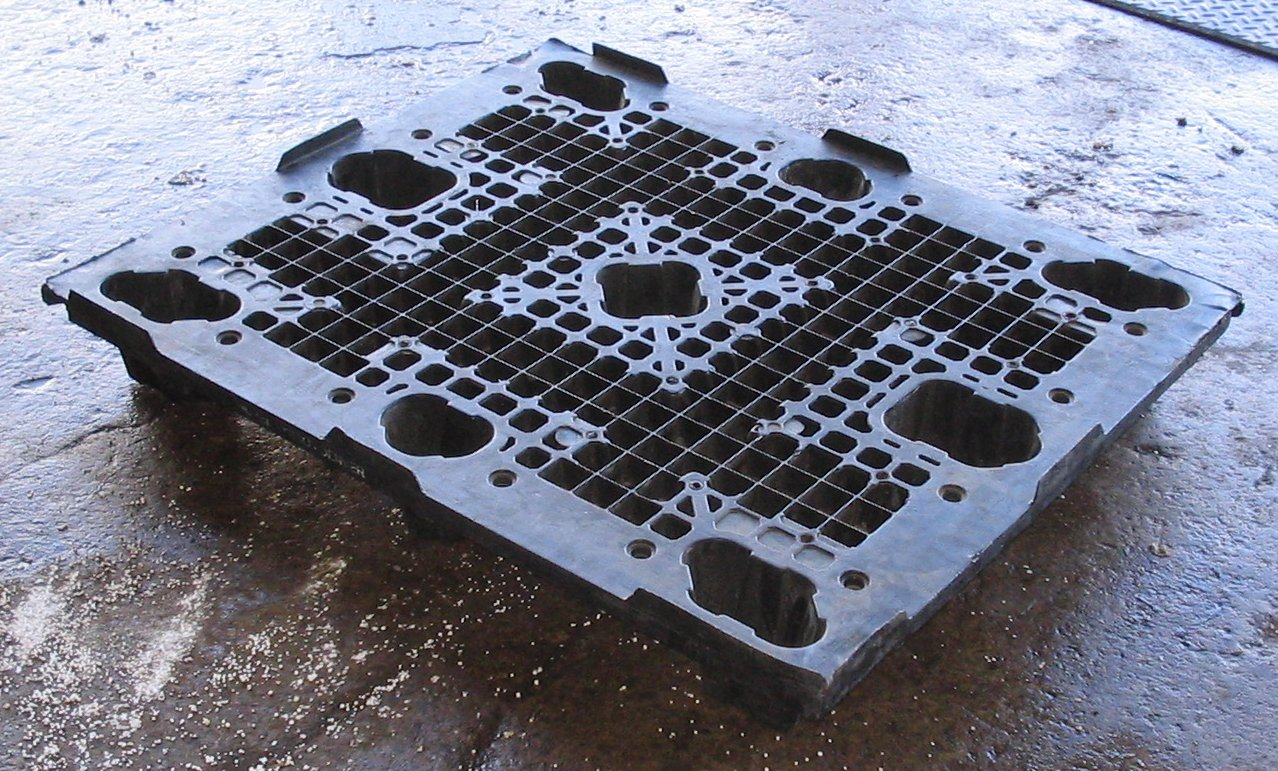
A plastic skid with nine legs, which can be lifted from all four sides. This type of transport is commonly called a pallet, but since it has no bottom, it is technically a skid.

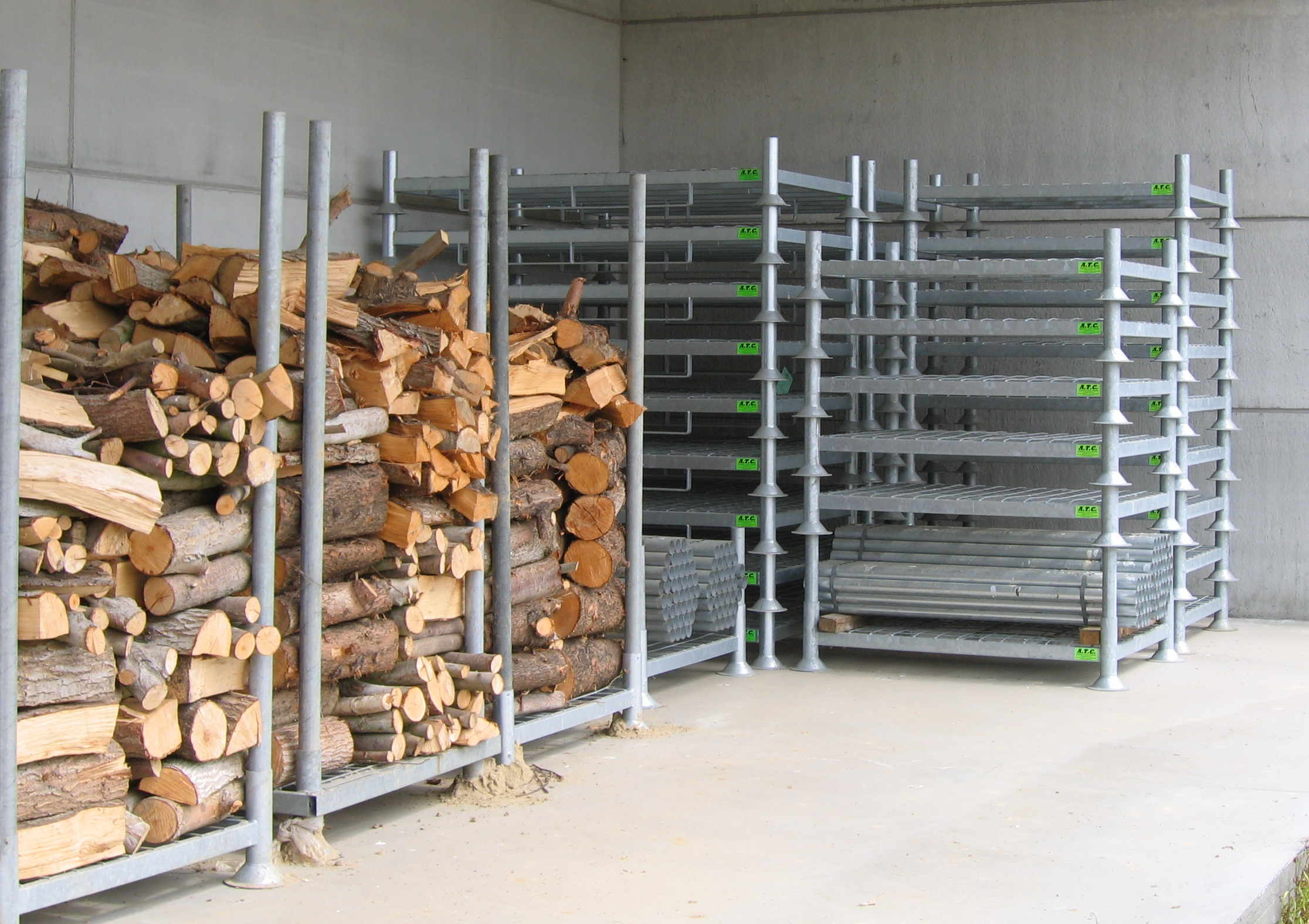
A metal pallet with removable beams, in this case for firewood

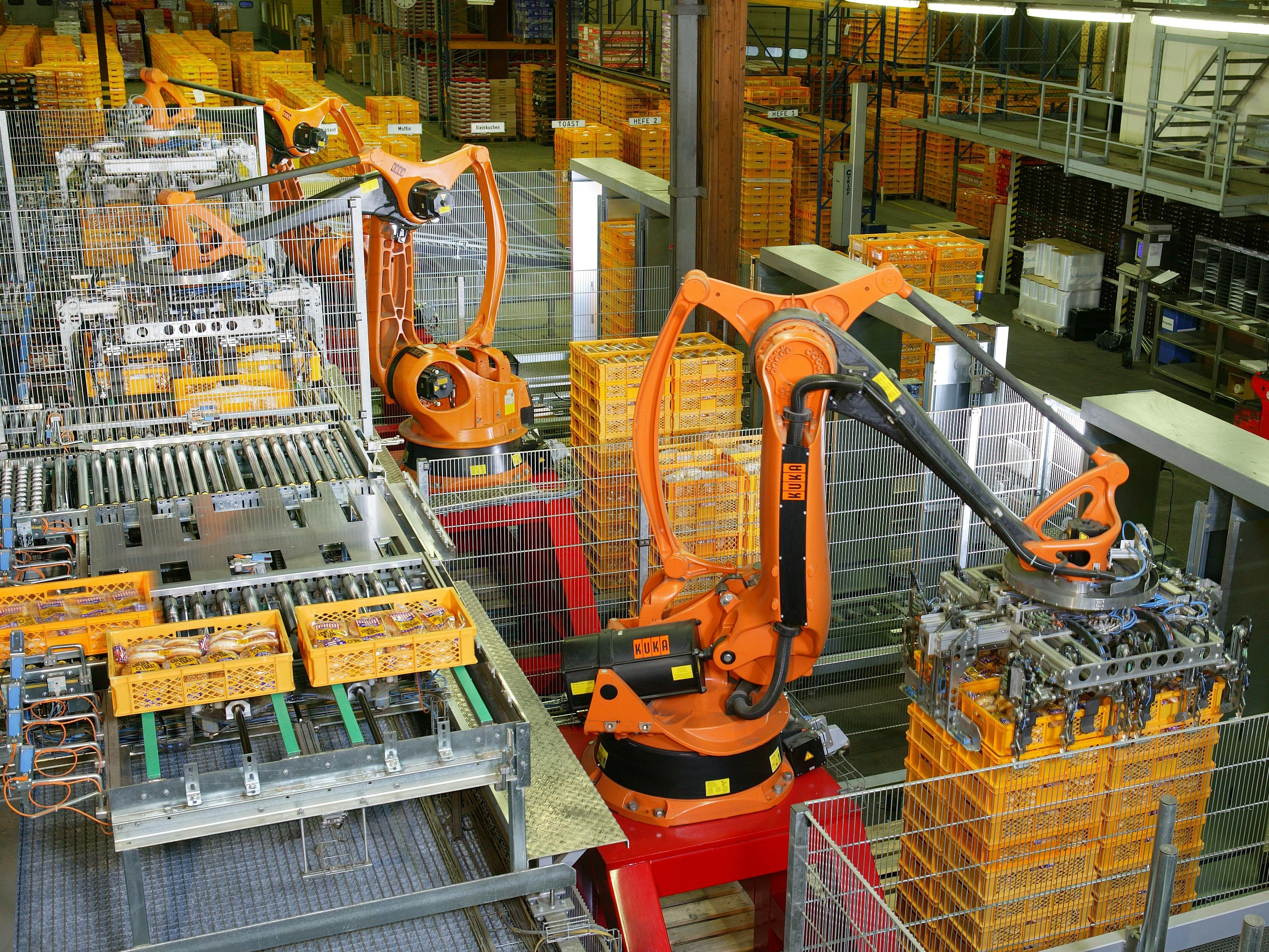
Automated palletizer of bread with industrial KUKA robots at a bakery in Germany

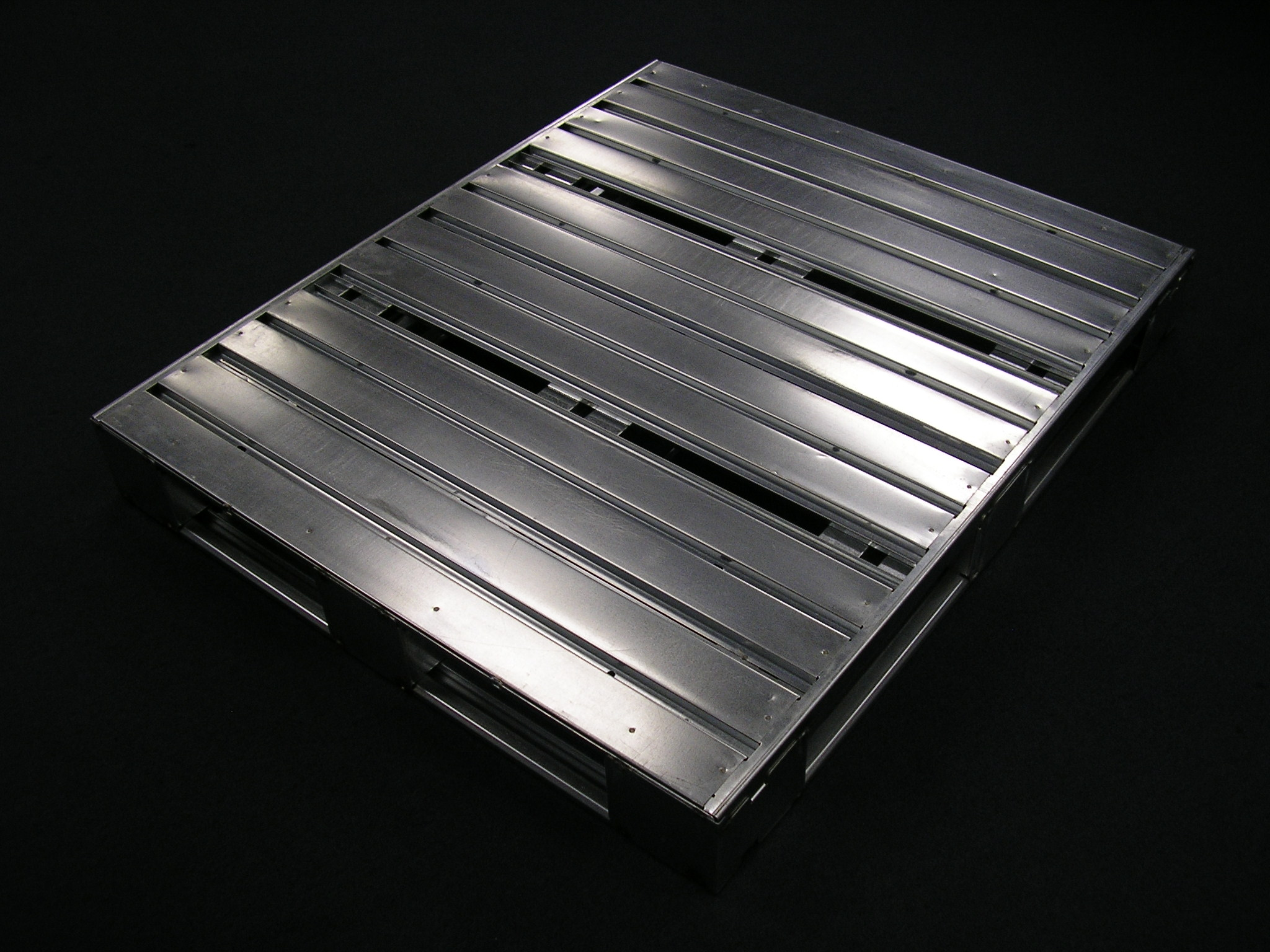
48 in × 40 in (122 cm × 102 cm) galvanized steel pallet. Galvanized steel pallets are fireproof and rust resistant.

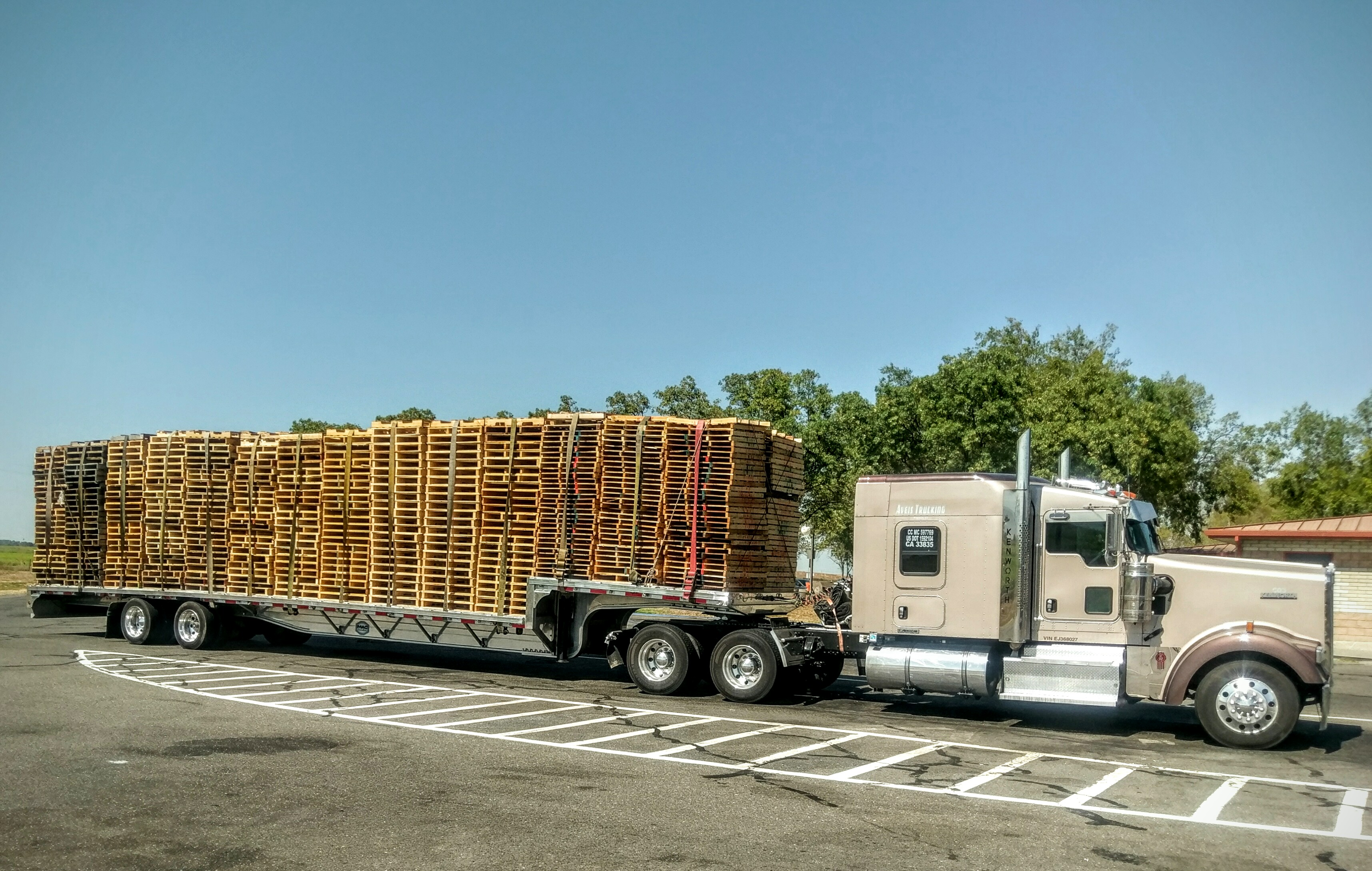
A truckload of used wooden pallets in California

A pallet (also called a skid) is a flat transport structure, which supports goods in a stable fashion while being lifted by a forklift, a pallet jack, a front loader, a jacking device, or an erect crane. Many pallets can handle a load of 1,000 kg (2,200 lb). While most pallets are wooden, pallets may also be made of plastic, metal, paper, and recycled materials.

A pallet is the structural foundation of a unit load, which allows handling and storage efficiencies. Goods in shipping containers are often placed on a pallet secured with strapping, stretch wrap or shrink wrap and shipped. In addition, pallet collars can be used to support and protect items shipped and stored on pallets.

Containerization for transport has spurred the use of pallets because shipping containers have the smooth, level surfaces needed for easy pallet movement. Since its invention in the twentieth century, its use has dramatically supplanted older forms of crating like the wooden box and the wooden barrel, as it works well with modern packaging like corrugated boxes and intermodal containers commonly used for bulk shipping. As of 2020 about half a billion pallets are made each year and about two billion pallets are in use across the United States alone.

Organizations using standard pallets for loading and unloading can have much lower costs for handling and storage, with faster material movement than businesses that do not. The exceptions are establishments that move small items such as jewelry or large items such as cars. But even they can be improved. For instance, the distributors of costume jewelry normally use pallets in their warehouses and car manufacturers use pallets to move components and spare parts. The greatest investment needed for economical pallet use is in the construction of commercial or industrial buildings. Ability to pass through standard doors and buildings make handling more convenient. For this reason, some modern pallet standards are designed to pass through standard doorways, for example the europallet (800 mm × 1,200 mm) and the U.S. military 35 in × 45.5 in (890 mm × 1,160 mm).

The lack of a single international standard for pallets causes substantial continuing expense in international trade. A single standard is difficult because of the wide variety of needs a standard pallet would have to satisfy: passing doorways, fitting in standard containers, and bringing low labor costs. For example, organizations already handling large pallets often see no reason to pay the higher handling cost of using smaller pallets that can fit through doors. Heavy-duty pallets are a form of reusable packaging and are designed to be used multiple times. Lightweight pallets are designed for a single use. In the EU, government legislation based on the Waste Framework Directive requires the reuse of packaging items in preference to recycling and disposal.

== History ==
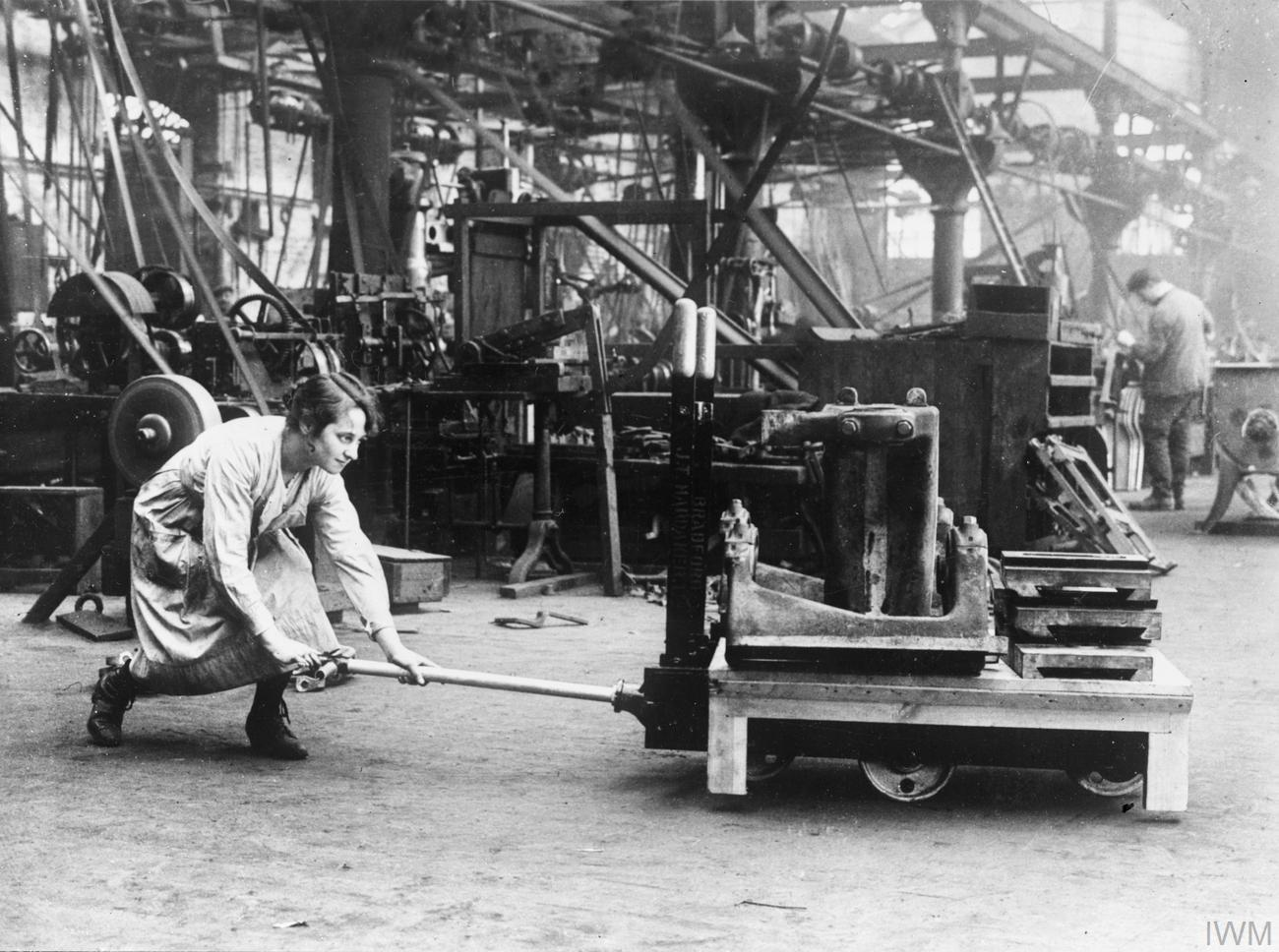
A worker at Bowling Iron Works, England, using an early pallet jack to lift a skid weighing 10 long hundredweight (1,120 lb; 508 kg), 1918

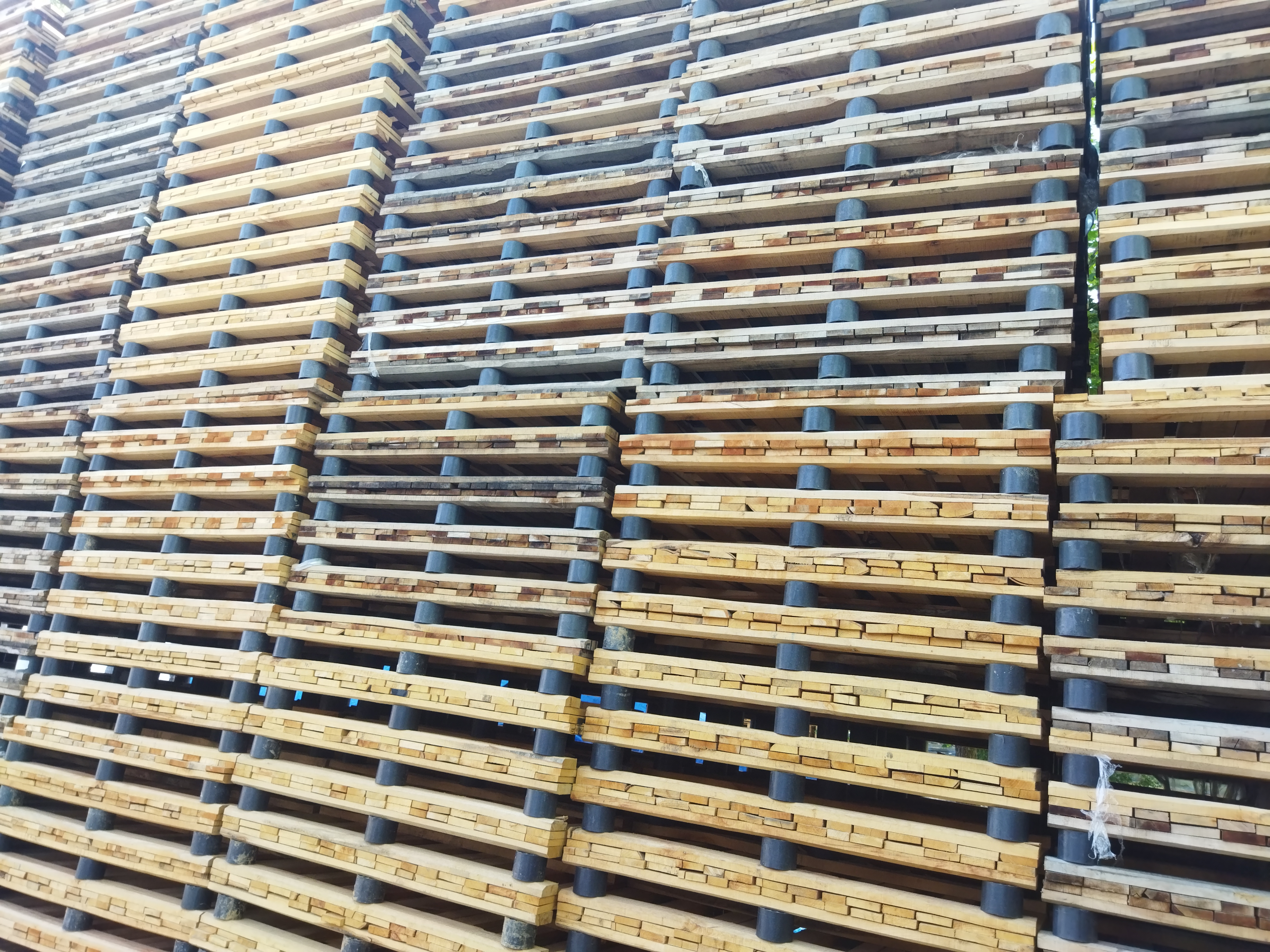
Stacked pallets in Turkey

Skids date back to Ancient Egypt and Ancient Mesopotamia, at least as far back as the 1st millennium B.C.

The development of the forklift and the needs of World War II logistics operations led to substantial use of pallets.

References to the early modern pallets types are slim with a string of patents showing parts of the development. The earliest may be a U.S. patent on a skid from 1924 describing Howard T. Hallowell's "Lift Truck Platform". In the late 1930s, pallets became more commonplace with the newer forklift types. George G. Raymond and William C. House filed for a patent in 1937 (granted US Patent 2178646 in 1939) for a pallet designed to complement a new pallet jack design; the essential features of both are still in common use today. A 1939 patent from Carl Clark shows a type of pallet with steel stringers. Wartime developments were often patented just after the war, so there is a patent from Robert Braun on a four-way pallet in 1945, and a patent from Norman Cahners (a U.S. Navy supply officer) shows a disposable pallet in 1949. The principle of a modern four-way pallet is described by Darling Graeme in 1949.

== Materials ==
=== Wood ===
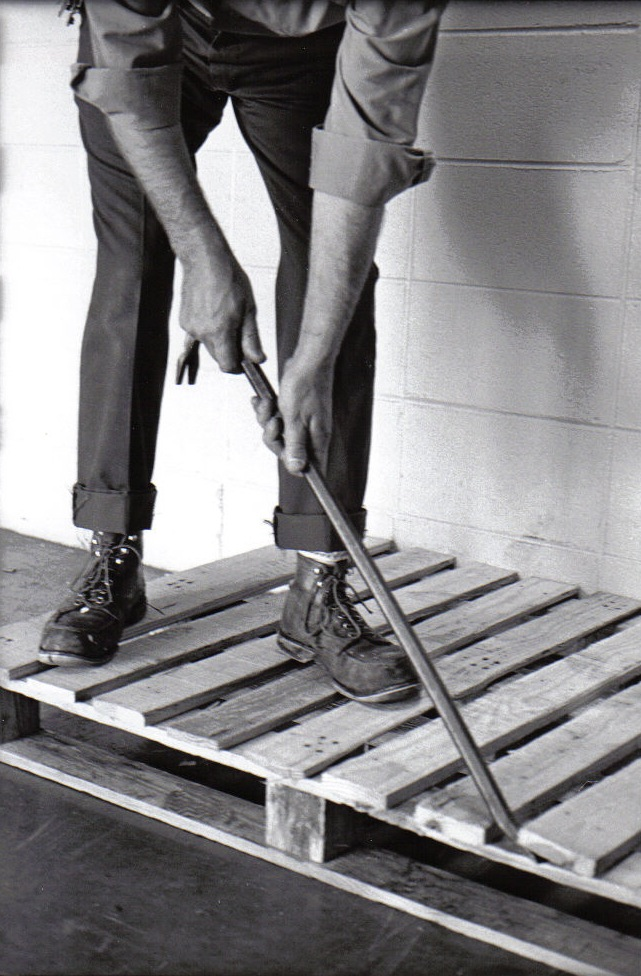
Wooden pallet being dismantled

The production of pallets accounts for 43% of hardwood and 15% of softwood usage in the U.S.

The cheapest pallets are made of softwood and are often considered expendable, to be discarded as trash along with other wrapping elements, at the end of the trip. These pallets are simple stringer pallets, and able to be lifted from two sides.

Slightly more complex, hardwood block pallets, plastic pallets and metal pallets can be lifted from all four sides. These costlier pallets usually require a deposit and are returned to the sender or resold as used. Many "four way" pallets are color-coded according to the loads they can bear, and other attributes. Wood pallets can pose serious bio-hazard risks as they are susceptible to bacterial and chemical contamination, such as E. coli problems in food and produce transportation, and even insect infestation, and thus the need for ISPM 15.

Wooden pallet construction specifications can depend on the pallet's intended use: general, FDA, storage, chemical, export; the expected load weight; type of wood desired: recycled, hard, soft, kiln dried or combo (new and recycled); and even the type of fasteners desired to hold the pallet together: staples or nails.

The price of wooden pallets reached a record high during the COVID-19 pandemic, due to increases in the prices of supplies and labor.

Although pallets come in all sizes and configurations, all pallets fall into two very broad categories: "stringer" and "block" pallets. Various software packages exist to assist the pallet maker in designing an appropriate pallet for a specific load and evaluating wood options to reduce costs.

Stringer pallets are one of the original models of wooden pallets. They use a frame of three or more parallel pieces of timber (called stringers). The top deckboards are then affixed to the stringers to create the pallet structure. Stringer pallets can have a notch cut into them allowing "four-way" entry. Forklifts can lift a stringer pallet from all four directions, though lifting by the stringers is more secure. Stringer pallets can be made of both wood and plastic.

Block pallets utilize both parallel and perpendicular stringers to better facilitate efficient handling. A block pallet is also known as a "four-way" pallet, since a pallet-jack may be used from any side to move it.

Carrier blocks are specialized pallets for lumber carriers

Flush pallets are pallets with deck boards that are flush with the stringers and stringer boards along the ends and sides of the pallet.

All stringer and some block pallets have "unidirectional bases", i.e. bottom boards oriented in one direction. While automated handling equipment can be designed for this, often it can operate faster and more effectively if the bottom edges of a pallet have bottom boards oriented in both directions. For example, it may not need to turn a pallet to rack it, and operation is less sensitive to pallet orientation.

The least expensive way to improve a pallet is usually to specify better nails. With non-wood pallets, a controlled coefficient of friction is often helpful to prevent the pallet from slipping from forks and racks. Stiffer pallets are more durable, and are handled more easily by automated equipment. If a pallet does not need to be lifted from all four sides, two-way pallets with unnotched stringers may be used, with the additional benefits of added rigidity and strength. Specifying tolerances on flatness and water content may help the supplier meet target requirements. Inspection of pallets, whether in person or by a third-party (such as "SPEQ" inspected pallets) offer additional assurance of quality.

The main processes that are used to manufacture wooden pallets:

- Material selection
- Cutting wood plate / block
- Chamfering (depends on the demand)
- Notching
- Nailing wooden pallet

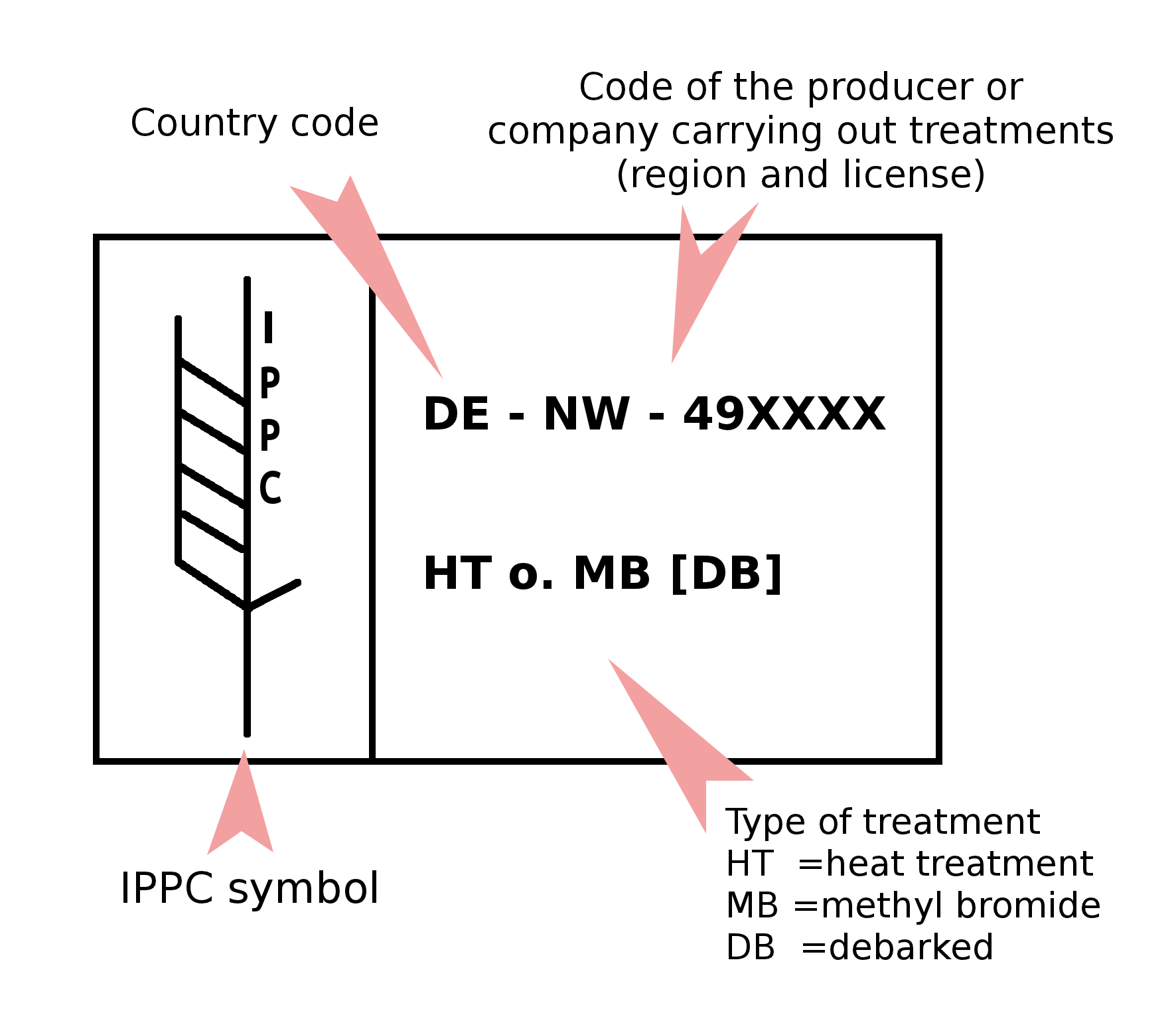
IPPC marks on a pallet from Germany (DE)

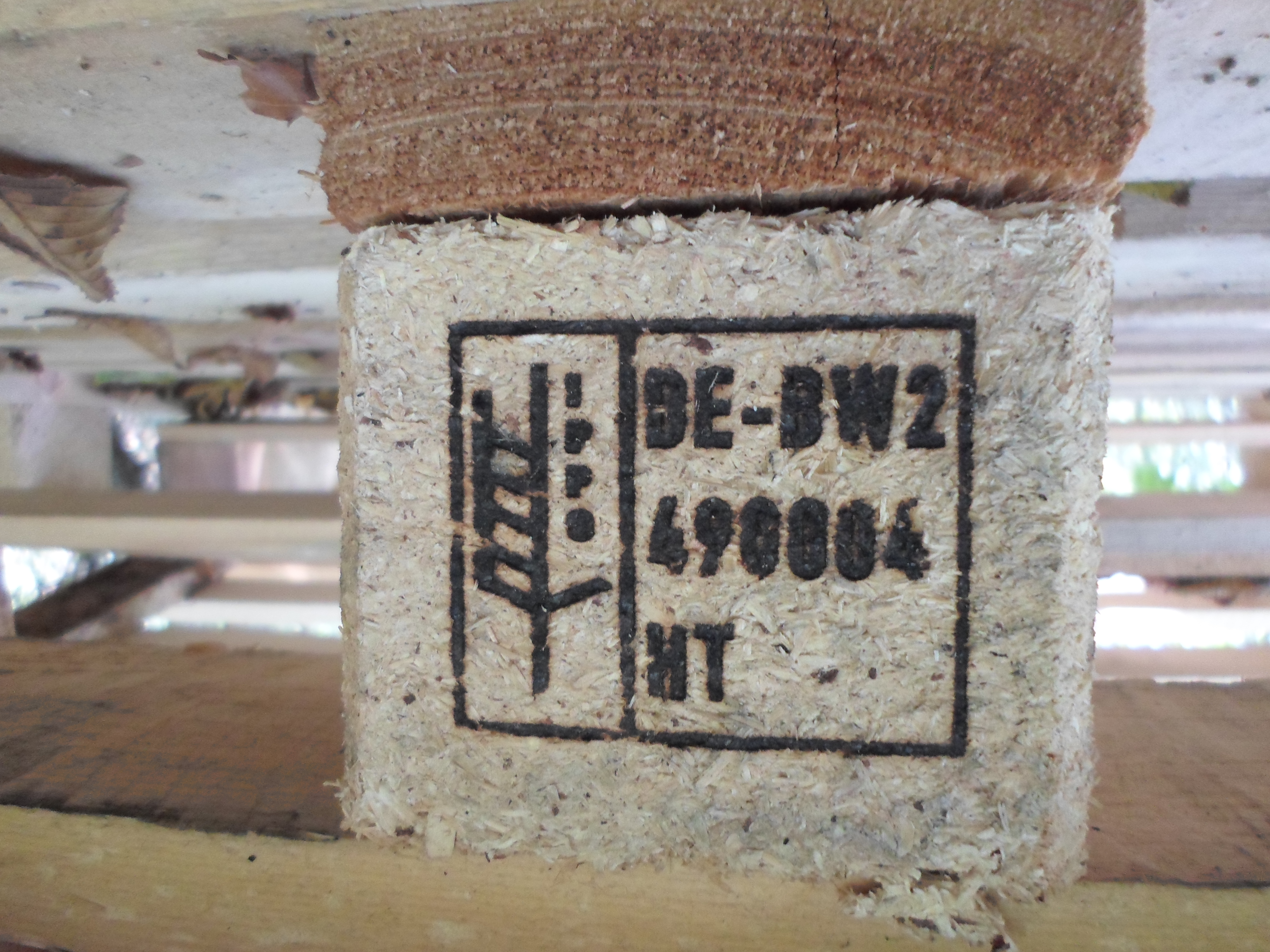
IPPC marks on a pallet from Germany (DE)

Due to the International Plant Protection Convention (abbreviated IPPC), most pallets shipped across national borders must be made of materials that are incapable of being a carrier of invasive species of insects and plant diseases. The standards for these pallets are specified in ISPM 15.

Pallets made of raw, untreated wood are not compliant with ISPM 15. To be compliant the pallets (or other wood packaging material) must meet debarked standards, and must be treated by either of the following means under the supervision of an approved agency:

- Heat treatment: The wood must be heated to achieve a minimum core temperature of 56 °C (133 °F) for at least 30 minutes. Pallets treated using this method bear the initials HT near the IPPC logo.
- Chemical fumigation: The wood must be fumigated with methyl bromide. Pallets treated using this method bear the initials MB near the IPPC logo. From 19 March 2010 the use of methyl bromide as a treatment according to ISPM15 has been banned within all EU member states. This is due to causing potential harm to the Earth's stratospheric ozone layer.

Treated wood pallets must be stamped on two opposite sides, indicating either HT for heat treated or MB for methyl bromide treatment.

Pallets made of non-wood materials such as steel, aluminum, plastic, or engineered wood products, such as plywood, oriented strand board, or corrugated fiberboard do not need IPPC approval, and are considered to be exempt from ISPM 15 regulations.

=== Plastic ===
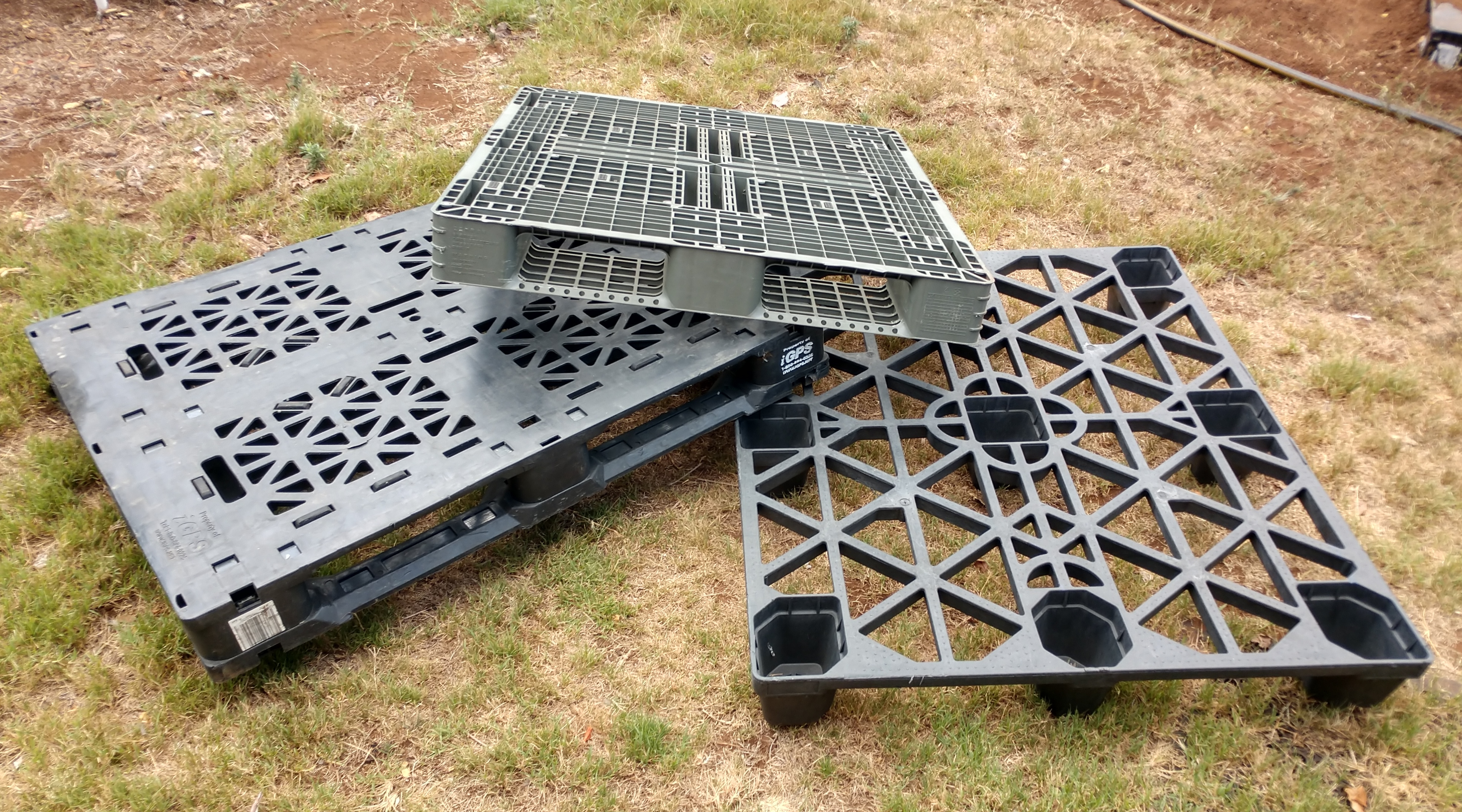
Three different types of plastic pallets.

Plastic pallets are often made of new HDPE or recycled PET (drink bottles). They are usually extremely durable, lasting for a hundred trips or more, and resist weathering, rot, chemicals and corrosion. The benefits of plastic pallets over wood pallets include the ability to be easily sanitized, resistance to odor, fire retardancy, longer service life span, durability and better product protection, non-splintering, and lighter weight, thus saving on transportation and labor costs and making them safer and more environmentally friendly. They often stack. Plastic pallets are exempt by inspection for biosafety concerns, and easily sanitize for international shipping. HDPE is impervious to most acids, and toxic chemicals clean from them more easily. Some plastic pallets can collapse from plastic creep if used to store heavy loads for long periods. Plastic pallets cannot easily be repaired, and can be ten times as expensive as hardwood, so they are often used by logistics service providers who can profit from their durability and stackability. The large supply chains have increased the use of plastic pallets as many organisations seek to reduce costs through waste, transport, and health and safety. Pallets and dollies can be combined (for example the Pally), eliminating pallet instability and the need for additional lifting equipment along with creating valuable space in busy operating environments. They also deliver significant time and cost savings by reducing supply chain handling. Plastics' reusability has contributed to an increase in usage of plastic pallets.

Plastic pallets are produced and used widely in the U.S. and Europe, spurred by the adoption of the ISPM 15. A full comparison of wood vs plastic can be made by a life cycle analysis. Plastic pallets can cost 10 times as much as hardwood pallets and even more expensive compared to cheap expendable softwood pallets. RFID chips can be molded into the pallets to monitor locations and track inventory.

There are six main types of plastic processes that are used to manufacture pallets:

- High pressure injection molding
- Structural foam molding
- Thermoforming
- Compression molding
- Rotational molding
- Profile extrusion

=== Paper ===
Paper pallets, also referred to as "ecopallets", are often used for light loads, but engineered paper pallets are increasingly used for loads that compare with wood. Paper pallets are also used where recycling and easy disposal is important. New designs of ecopallets have been made from just two flat pieces of corrugated board (no glue/staples) and weigh just 4.5 kg (9.9 lb), offering dramatic freight savings. Ecopallets are also ISPM 15 exempt, negating fumigation and barrier "slip" sheets. They are cleaner, safer, and provide a cost-saving eco-friendly alternative to other pallet materials. Some engineered corrugated pallets offer a significantly reduced height, providing substantial freight cost reduction. Low-profile hand pallet trucks allow picking up pallets as low as 25 mm.

=== Steel ===
Steel pallets are strong and are used for heavy loads, high-stacking loads, long term dry storage, and loads moved by abusive logistic systems. They are often used for military ammunition. Metal pallets make up less than 1% of the market. Materials include carbon steel, stainless steel, and aluminum. Of these, carbon steel offers excellent durability at the lowest cost. Stainless steel does not require a paint coating, and is preferred for such applications as clean room environments. Carbon steel units are expensive compared to wood, and stainless and aluminum cost about 2–3 times that of carbon steel. Long term costs, however, can be lower than wood. General advantages of metal pallets are high strength and stiffness, excellent durability, resistance to vermin, the absence of splinters, sanitization, and recyclability. Disadvantages include a higher initial price, significant weight, low friction, and susceptibility to rusting (in the case of carbon steel). Metal is primarily used in captive or closed loop environments where durability and product protection are key performance requirements. Metal units today are increasingly price competitive and lighter in weight. Primary industries that use metal pallets include automotive, pharmaceutical, lawn tractors, motorcycles, and tires.

Aluminum pallets are stronger than wood or plastic, lighter than steel, and resist weather, rotting, plastic creep and corrosion. They are sometimes used for air-freight, long-term outdoor or at-sea storage, or military transport.

== Economic impact and loss ==
Wooden pallets are widely used in global supply chains for transporting goods, with the United States producing approximately 513 million pallets annually as of 2025. Pallet loss is a significant issue in the logistics industry, with an estimated 14 million pallets, valued at £140 million, reported missing in Europe in the mid-2000s.

== Dimensions ==
Wooden pallets typically consist of three or four stringers that support several deckboards, on top of which goods are placed. In a pallet measurement, the first number is the stringer length and the second is the deckboard length. Square or nearly square pallets help a load resist tipping.

Pallet users want pallets to pass easily through buildings, to stack and fit in racks, to be accessible to forklifts and pallet jacks, and to function in automated warehouses. To avoid shipping air, pallets should also be packed tightly inside intermodal containers and vans.

Though some major standards exist, there are no universally accepted standards for pallet dimensions. Companies and organizations utilize hundreds of different pallet sizes around the globe. While no single-dimensional standard governs pallet production, a few different sizes are widely used.

The standard 48×40 North American pallet, or GMA pallet, has stringers of 48 inches and deckboards of 40 inches, and was standardized by the Grocery Manufacturers Association (GMA).

- A standard wooden pallet (48 in × 40 in × 6 in or 1,219 mm × 1,016 mm × 152 mm) with a static load bearing capacity of 3 short tons (2.7 long tons; 2.7 t) and a 1-short-ton (0.89-long-ton; 0.91 t) dynamic capacity, will weigh approximately 33 to 48 lb (15 to 22 kg)
- GMA pallets typically weigh 37 pounds (17 kg), and are 6 1/2 inches (170 mm) tall. Their deck boards measure 3 1/4 inches (83 mm) wide and are 5/16 inch (8 mm) thick each. Other dimensions of pallets have different weight capacities.

Lightweight plastic pallets can weigh as little as 3 to 15 pounds (1.4 to 6.8 kg), while heavier models may weigh up to 300 pounds (140 kg). Standard GMA pallets can hold up to 460 pounds (210 kg).

Heavy duty International Plant Protection Convention (IPPC) Pallets are approximately 44 inches (1,118 mm) wide by 48 inches (1,219 mm) long, have three wood stringers that are a nominal 4 inches (102 mm) high by 3 inches (76 mm) wide timber, and weigh about 135 pounds (61 kg). Their deck is fully covered by 30 mm (1.18 in) plywood, and is painted in blue in Europe and Russia.

Two-way pallets are designed to be lifted by the deckboards.

Four-way pallets, or pallets for heavy loads (or general-purpose systems that might have heavy loads) are best lifted by their more rigid stringers. These pallets are usually heavier, bigger and more durable than two-way pallets.

=== ISO ===
The International Organization for Standardization (ISO) sanctions six pallet dimensions, detailed in ISO Standard 6780:2003 Flat pallets for intercontinental materials handling — Principal dimensions and tolerances, which was reviewed and confirmed in 2014:

Dimensions (W × L) mm	Dimensions (W × L) in	Wasted floor, ISO container	Region most used in
1,016 × 1,219	40.00 × 48.00	3.7% (20 pallets in 40 ft ISO)	North America
1,000 × 1,200	39.37 × 47.24	6.7%	Europe, Asia; similar to 40 × 48-inch. Same footprint as a EUR 3 pallet.
1,165 × 1,165	45.9 × 45.9	8.1%	Australia
1,067 × 1,067	42.00 × 42.00	11.5%	North America, Europe, Asia
1,100 × 1,100	43.30 × 43.30	14%	Asia
800 × 1,200	31.50 × 47.24	15.2%	Europe; fits many doorways. Same footprint as a EUR 1 pallet.

=== North America ===
Of the top pallets used in North America, the most commonly used by far is the Grocery Manufacturers Association (GMA) pallet, which accounts for 30% of all new wood pallets produced in the United States. The ISO also recognizes the GMA pallet footprint as one of its six standard sizes.

Dimensions (W × L) mm	Dimensions (W × L) in	Production rank	Industries using
1,016 × 1,219	40 × 48	1	Grocery, many others
1,067 ×1,067	42 × 42	2	Telecommunications, paint
1219 × 1219	48 × 48	3	Drums
1,219 × 1,016	48 × 40	4	Military, cement
1,219 × 1,067	48 × 42	5	Chemical, beverage
1,016 × 1,016	40 × 40	6	Dairy
1,219 × 1,143	48 × 45	7	Automotive
1,118 × 1,118	44 × 44	8	Drums, chemical
914 × 914	36 × 36	9	Beverage
1,219 × 914	48 × 36	10	Beverage, shingles, packaged paper
889 × 1,156	35 × 45.5	Unknown	Military 1/2 ISO container, fits 36-inch standard doors
2,240 × 2,740	88 ×108	Unknown	Military air cargo (463L system)
1,219 × 508	48 × 20	Unknown	Retail

=== Europe ===
EuroPallet

EURO pallet type	Dimensions (L × W × H)	ISO pallet alternative
EUR; EUR 1	800 mm × 1,200 mm × 144 mm 31.50 in × 47.24 in × 5.67 in	ISO1, same size as EUR. The pallet weight is 20–25 kg. Weight of a load: 2490 kg.
EUR 2	1,200 mm × 1,000 mm × 144 mm 47.24 in × 39.37 in × 5.67 in	ISO2. The pallet weight is 33 kg. Weight of a load: 1470 kg.
EUR 3	1,000 mm × 1,200 mm × 144 mm 39.37 in × 47.24 in × 5.67 in	The pallet weight is 29 kg. Weight of a load of 1920 kg.
EUR 6	800 mm × 600 mm × 144 mm 31.50 in × 23.62 in × 5.67 in	ISO0, half the size of EUR. The pallet weight is 9.5 kg. Weight of the safe load: 500 kg.
	600 mm × 400 mm 23.62 in × 15.75 in	quarter the size of EUR
	400 mm × 300 mm 15.75 in × 11.81 in	one-eighth the size of EUR

=== Australia ===
The Australian standard pallet is a pallet size commonly found in Australia but rarely found elsewhere. It is a square pallet originally made of hardwood 1,165 mm × 1,165 mm (45.9 in × 45.9 in) in size, which fits perfectly in the RACE developed by the Public Transport Commission used on Australian railways. They are ill-suited for the standard 20-foot (6.1 m) and 40-foot (12 m) ISO shipping containers used around the globe. Australian standard pallets are usually manufactured in hardwood, but 1165 × 1165 mm pallets can also be manufactured using lighter timber suitable for use as disposable pallets using 16 millimeter boards. Extensively used in storage and warehousing, they are popular pallets for racking, with the right shape and size to be removed from transport and directly onto warehouse racking for storage.

The Australian standard pallet dates back to World War II, while ISO containers date to the late 1950s. Although the pallet's dimensions predate the ISO containers, it requires less dunnage, is square, and leaves less wasted space than other pallets, including the GMA pallet. In 2010, Australia adopted the globally accepted ISPM 15 wood packaging material regulations (before this time, it was hardwood and more expensive).

== Standards bodies ==
A number of different organizations and associations around the world work towards establishing and promulgating standards for pallets. Some strive to develop universal standards for pallet dimensions, types of material used in construction, performance standards, and testing procedures. Other organizations choose to focus on pallet standards for a specific industry (such as groceries) or type of material (such as wood).

ISO Technical Committee 51 (Pallets for unit load method of materials handling) states its scope of work entailing the "standardization of pallets in general use in the form of platforms or trays on which goods may be packed to form unit loads for handling by mechanical devices". The Technical Committee works in conjunction with other Technical Committees focused on transportation infrastructure to develop interrelated standards. TC 51 is responsible for developing ISO Standard 6780: Flat pallets for intercontinental materials handling—Principal dimensions and tolerances as well as sixteen other standards related to pallet construction and testing.

The National Wood Pallet and Container Association (NWPCA) is a trade organization based in the United States representing the interests of wood pallet and container manufacturers.

The U.S. Department of Defense, Department of the Navy, Naval Sea Systems Command maintains MIL-STD-1660, the standard description of palletized unit loads for the U.S. Military and some allies. DOD Unit loads generally use 40 in × 48 in (1,016 mm × 1,219 mm) pallets, are less than 4,000 lb (1,814 kg), weatherproof, and stack 16 ft (4.88 m) high. They often use steel pallets, steel straps with notched seals, outdoor plywood, and plastic film. The standard describes tests for stacking, transport, sling, forklift and pallet jack, impact, drop tests, tip, water-retention, and disassembly.

In addition to the other standards it publishes, the European Committee for Standardization, also known as the Comité Européen de Normalisation (CEN), produces standards for pallets. While the standards are voluntary in nature, many companies and organizations involved in transportation have adopted them. The major standard for pallets produced by CEN is ICS: 55.180.20 General purpose pallets

== Hazards ==
Both wood and plastic pallets are possible fire hazards. In the US, the National Fire Protection Association requires that both types "shall be stored outside or in a detached structure" unless protected by fire sprinklers.

Items made from pallet wood are likely to be durable and demonstrate good weather resistance due to these treatments. However, close contact with pallet wood or inhalation of dusts from sanding or sawing can be a source of exposure to pesticide and fungicide chemicals. It is likely that the January 2010 recall of Johnson & Johnson Tylenol and other drugs was due to their being stored on wooden pallets that had been treated with the fungicide/pesticide 2,4,6-tribromophenol. This chemical can be degraded by molds to produce 2,4,6-tribromoanisole whose strong, musty odor caused consumers to complain. There is no acute or chronic health data on 2,4,6-tribromoanisole, but it is believed that the contaminated drugs caused nausea and other health effects in some people.

== Variants ==
An air cargo pallet is a detachable and interchangeable airworthy floor panel. It can be loaded and unloaded on aircraft to transport air cargo Most are less than 1 in (25 mm) thick, for a cargo aircraft. Many civilian types have evolved over 6 decades from the thicker military 463L Master Pallet. When combined with a cargo net, an air cargo pallet becomes an aircraft Unit Load Device and must be inspected for integrity before use in an aircraft. It is handled on dedicated roller or ball-mat ground equipment and vehicles (fork-lifting is prohibited especially when the pallet is loaded).

Pallet boxes are pallets with four pallet walls on top and possibly a lid. Unlike pallets, pallet boxes can be stacked when they are fully loaded. They may also be fitted with a lid during stacking for stability reasons. By stacking pallet boxes on each other space can be used more efficiently, thus they are able to save warehouse space and truck load capacity. Another advantage of pallet boxes is that the goods are stored safely and are not easily damaged during logistic movements and transport. Furthermore, there are collapsible pallet boxes from which the pallet walls can be laid flat on the pallet. In this way, less space is required during empty return transport.

Bulk boxes are closely related; they are usually large separate boxes shipped on pallets.

== Other uses ==
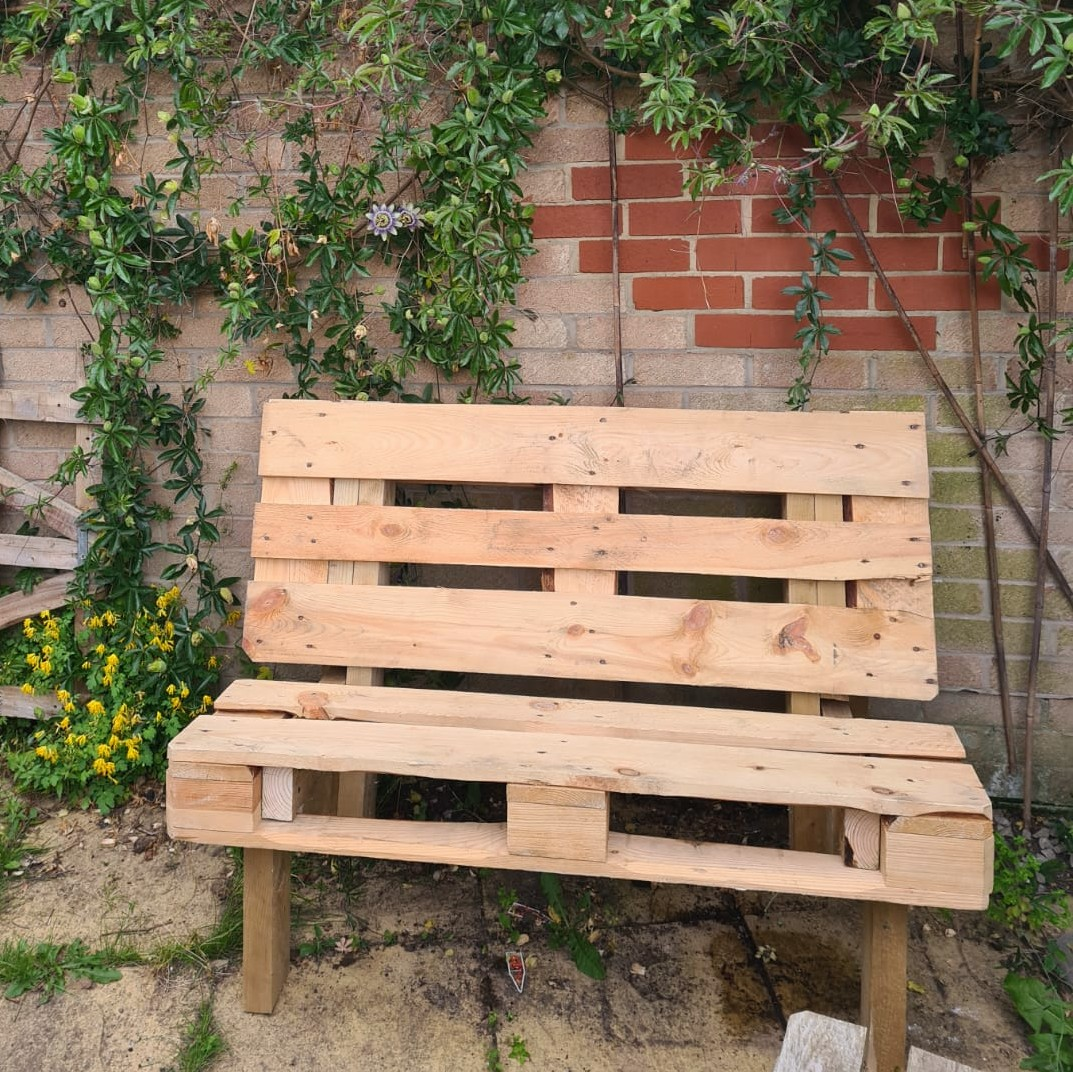
Example of a bench constructed from repurposed pallets

Old and discarded wooden pallets can be used in pallet crafts and various furniture pieces.

Discarded wooden pallets should not be used for firewood or crafts unless it has been determined that the wood in these pallets has not been treated with wood preservatives, fungicides and/or pesticides. Various pyrethrins and propiconazole are common treatments for wooden pallets. In addition, imported palletized goods are routinely fumigated with highly toxic pesticides. During use, harmful materials or chemicals also may spill on the pallet wood and be absorbed.

Craft publications have advised readers to use pallets to build a skateboarding obstacle called a manual pad, barricades during amateur paintball games, or other sport-related items. Other publications have suggested using pallet wood for small animal cages or fences. Pallet wood has been recycled for use as furniture wood by at least one company.

The acoustic guitar maker Taylor Guitars once produced a high quality "pallet guitar" made from pallet wood, in order to demonstrate the importance of construction technique versus expensive exotic woods.

I-Beam Design, an architecture and interior design firm based in New York City, won an award in a 1999 competition sponsored by Architecture for Humanity for their submission of "The Pallet House", a design solution to house the returning refugees of Kosovo. Full-scale prototypes of the Pallet House were featured in the "Casa per Tutti" Exhibit at the Milan Triennale and the Earth Awards in Prince Charles' Royal Gardens as part of The Prince's Charities Foundation's Conference on a Sustainable Future organized in collaboration with IBM and the Financial Times. The Pallet House is an affordable transitional home that can become permanent over time. It can be used as refugee housing or as affordable housing as well. Due to the nature of the pallet module, the wall cavity can be insulated with a variety of materials that are accessible to the user.

The two Austrian students Andreas Claus Schnetzer and Gregor Pils from the University of Vienna created a home entitled Pallet house; as the name suggests, they reused pallets to form a modular, energy efficient and affordable housing. The idea was born in 2008 during a competition and the Pallet house has been exhibited in several European cities including Venice, Vienna, Linz and Grenoble.

In 2014, Denver, Colorado was host to an Inaugural Pallet-Fest festival, which showcased the versatility of pallets and included large art structures made with upcycled materials, a pallet maze, a pallet amphitheater with live musical performances, sustainable living demonstrations, an upcycled fashion show, vendors and artists selling upcycled goods, and a parkour course. The event was crowdfunded and organized by Upcycle Events.

In Northern Ireland, wooden pallets are used to construct bonfires during celebrations of the Eleventh Night, the night before the Twelfth of July. They are built in the weeks ahead and are lit in loyalist neighbourhoods, often accompanied by street parties and marching bands. There is some contention to this practice, especially when they involve the burning of flags or effigies.

== See also ==
- Molded pulp – Packaging material
- Pallet inverters – Machine used to turn over pallets
- Pallet racking – Material handling storage aid system designed to store materials on pallets
- Spill pallet – Pallet for containing oil spills
- Stillage – Transport structure with support
