= Dunnage =

Material used to load and secure cargo during transportation

Dunnage is inexpensive or waste material used to load and secure cargo during transportation; more loosely, it refers to miscellaneous baggage, brought along during travel. The term can also refer to low-priority cargo used to fill out transport capacity which would otherwise ship underweight.

In the context of shipping manufactured goods, dunnage refers to the packing material used as protective fill inside the carton, box or other type container used to prevent the merchandise from being damaged during shipment. These materials include bubble wrap; wadded, crumpled or shredded paper; styrofoam; inflated air packs; and other materials.

== International laws ==
When a ship is unloaded, sometimes the dunnage may not be landed because of customs duties on imported timber or quarantine rules to prevent foreign insect pests from moving ashore, and as a result often the unwanted dunnage is later furtively jettisoned overside and adds to the area's driftwood problem. According to U.S. and International Law (MARPOL 73/78) it is illegal for ships to dump dunnage within 25 nautical miles (46 km) of the shore. Currently, the International Plant Protection Convention (IPPC), an international regulatory agency, mandates its 134 signatory countries to comply with the ISPM 15, which requires all dunnage to be heat-treated or fumigated with pesticides and marked with an accredited seal. There are several instances in which foreign insects have come ashore and caused devastation to the ecosystem, even ruining crops.

== Construction ==
In construction, dunnage is often scrap wood or disposable manufactured material whose purpose is to be placed on the ground to raise construction materials to allow access for forklifts and slings for hoisting, and to protect them from the elements.

Dunnage can also refer to a structural platform for mechanical equipment. Typically, these are open steel structures located on the roof of a building, consisting of steel beams supported on posts or bearing walls. They are used to raise equipment off the roof for various reasons, including maintenance access to both the roof surface and equipment itself, or to provide clearance to keep equipment out of any snow or rain that may collect on the roof. In this use, the dunnage is typically a permanent part of the building structure for the life of the equipment being supported.

== Dunnage bags ==
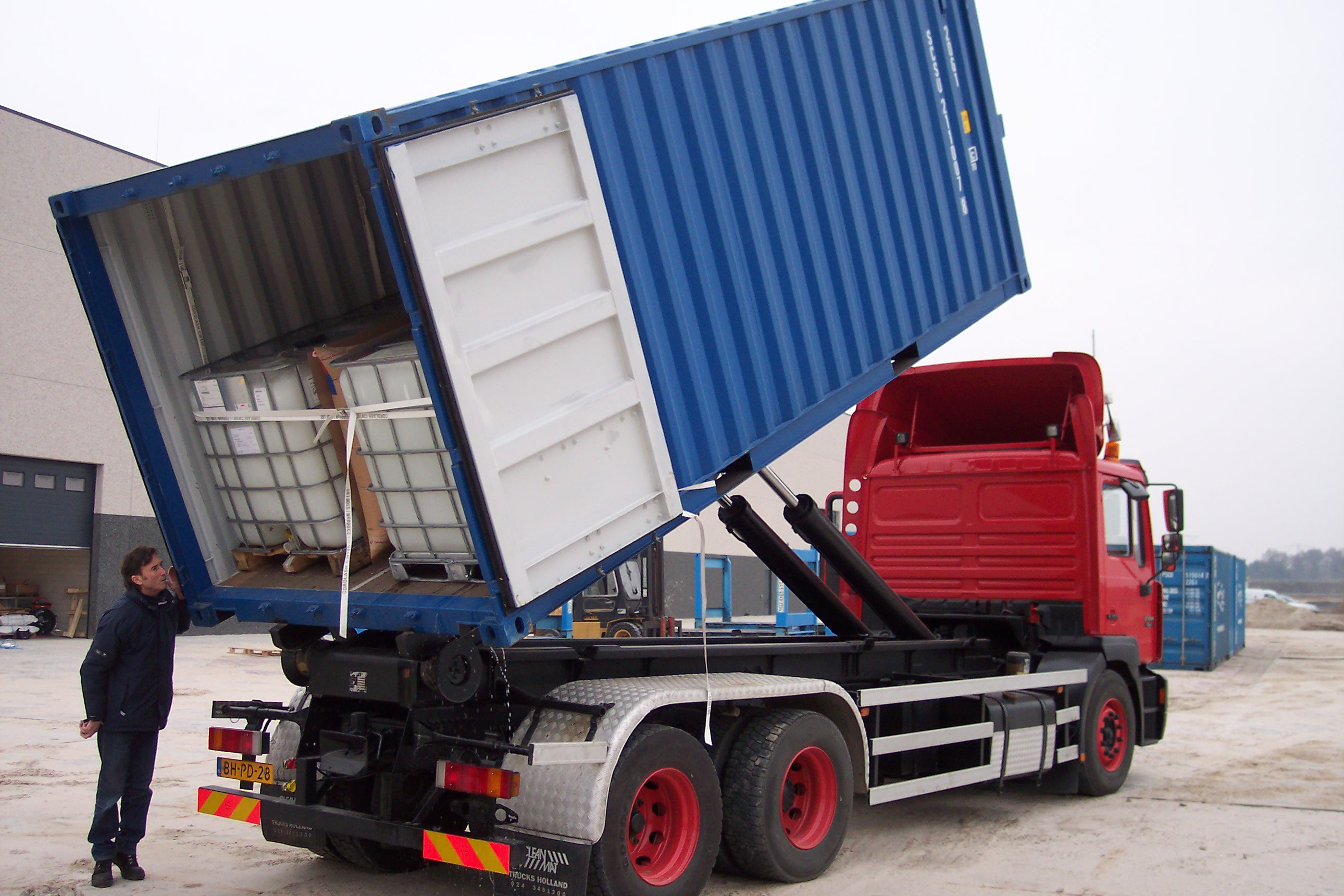
Stabilizing capabilities of dunnage bags in container

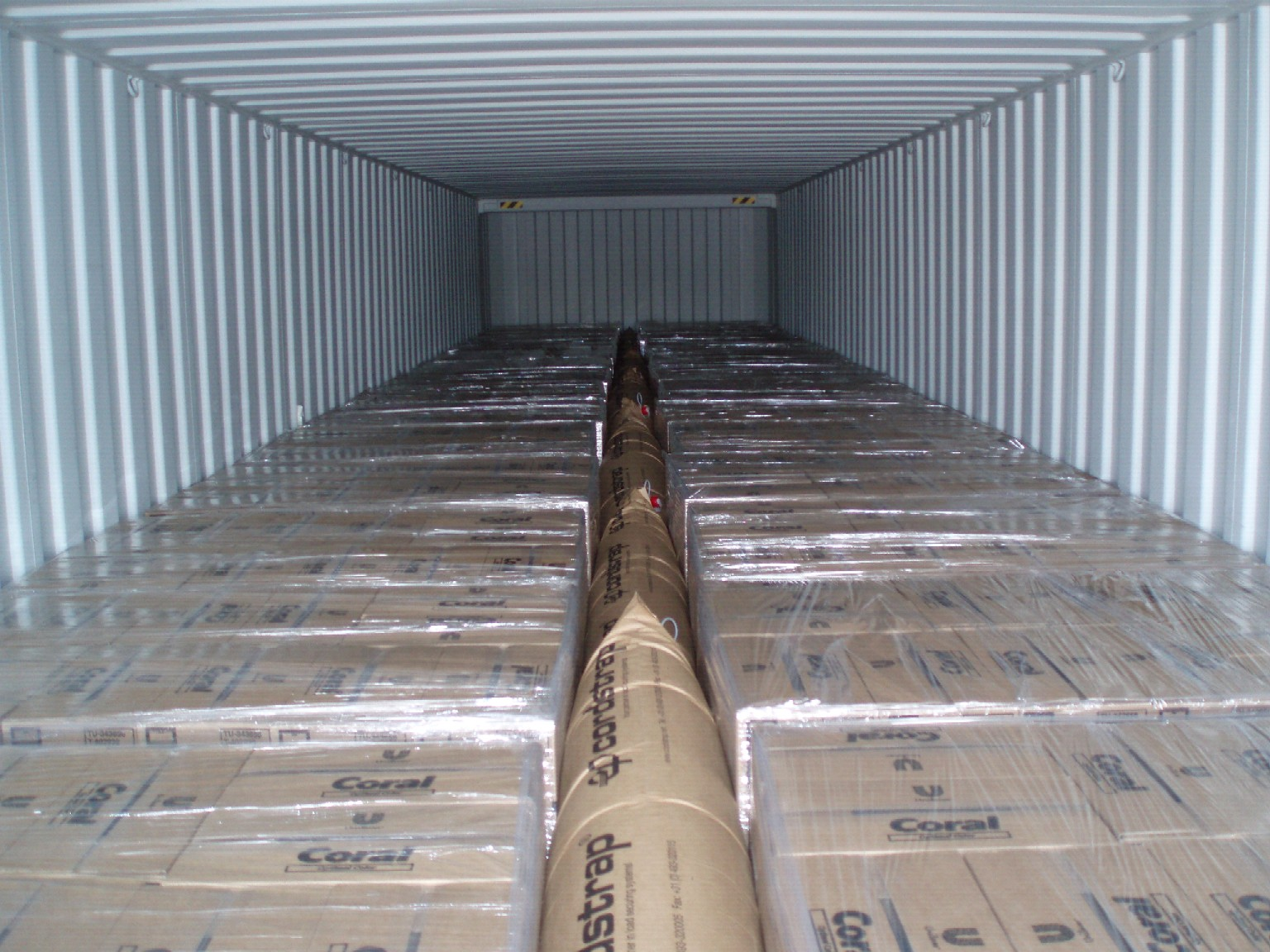
Application of dunnage bags in container

Dunnage bags are air-filled pouches that can be used to stabilize, secure and protect cargo during transportation. Dunnage bags are placed in the voids between the cargo items. Dunnage bags can be used in all modes of transportation; road, railway, ocean or air.

Dunnage bags can be used to protect and secure parts, but also as a cushion. It is more widely used in the automotive, aerospace, electronics industry, etc.

Originally rubber bags were used to brace pallets inside trucks. They evolved into kraft paper bags with a plastic-bag interior. As metal strapping has become less popular, many companies now use polyethylene- or vinyl-based bags because of their low cost. It is important to match the size of the bag to the void.

Starting in the 1950s, several US railroad freight carriers began rostering boxcars equipped with load-securing devices to prevent shifting during transit. These cars were usually labeled "Damage Free" or simply "DF". The interior equipment helped to eliminate the need for customer-supplied dunnage.

In the 21st century, Amazon began air-filling dunnage bags on site during packing in order to minimize environmental impact, shipping weight, and cost of packing materials.

== Ships ==
Dunnage for securing cargo in holds of ships has evolved from wooden boards forming "cribs" to modern mechanical, spring-loaded post-and-socket systems, exemplified by the "pogo sticks" used on US Navy Combat Logistics Force (CLF) ships which provide underway replenishment of stores, spares, repair parts, ammunition, ordnance, and liquids in cans and drums. Dunnage segregates cargo in the hold and prevents shifting of the cargo in response to ship motions.

== Shipbuilding ==
During the shipbuilding process, dunnage is commonly used to describe items such as welding machines, hoses, ladders, and scaffolding which are not part of the ship and will not remain aboard after it is completed.

== Miscellaneous uses of term ==
Outfitters and mule packers use the term dunnage when they transport freight, such as camping gear and food supplies, but do not carry passengers.

In fishing net products "dunnage" may refer to a reinforcement of the edges of the net. It has historically been widely used in the United Kingdom for a sailor's personal belongings, as in, "Stow your dunnage and report to the First Mate". On some vessels, it is used as a euphemism for human waste.

Many manufacturing facilities use the term dunnage to refer to the containers and packaging used for their finished goods. This can be anything from wood boxes or steel bins to wire baskets and plastic trays. Commonly this packaging is designed specifically to hold the product being manufactured and is proprietary to that manufacturing facilities requirements. In the medical device manufacturing industry, "dunnage" is an adequately justified substitute replacing actual medical devices during packaging and sterilization testing.

== See also ==
- Cushioning, package protection inside containers
- Ullage, unfilled space in a container
