= Palletizer =

Material-handling equipment

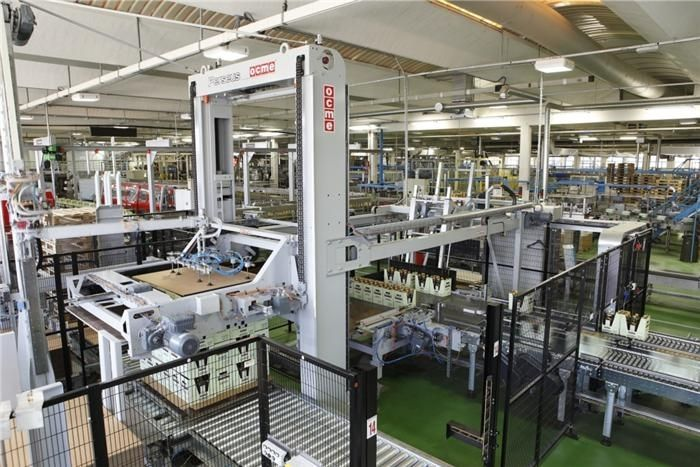
In-line palletizer

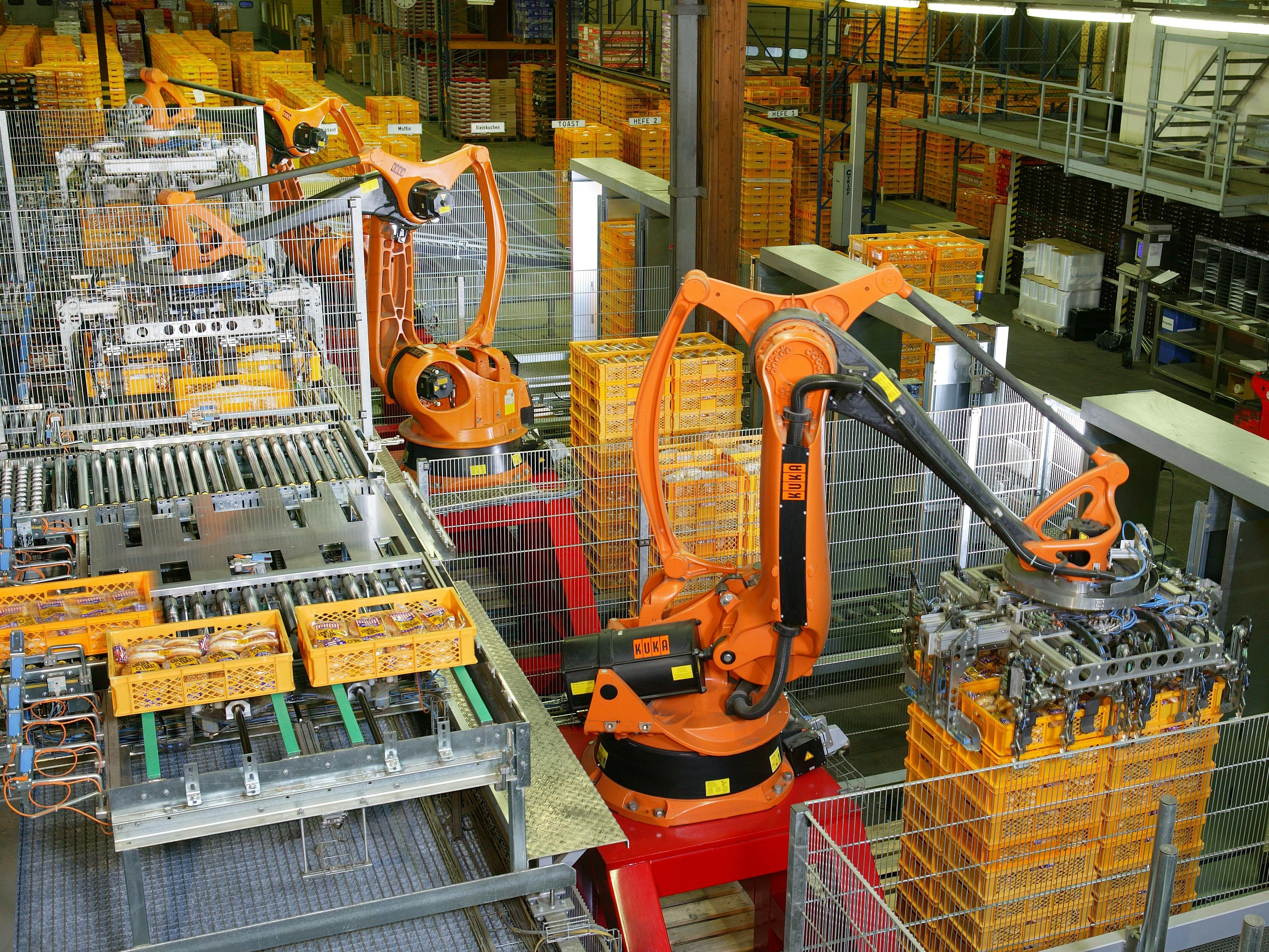
Palletizer using robotics

A palletizer or palletiser is a machine which provides automatic means for stacking cases of goods or products onto a pallet.

Manually placing boxes on pallets can be time consuming and expensive; it can also put unusual stress on workers. The first mechanized palletizer was designed, built, and installed in 1948 by a company formerly known as Lamson Corp.

There are specific types of palletizers including the row-forming which were introduced in the early 1950s. In row-forming palletizing applications loads are arranged on a row forming area and then moved onto a different area where layer forming takes place. This process repeats until a full layer of goods and products are configured to be placed on a pallet.

The in-line palletizer was developed in the 1970s when higher speeds were needed for palletizing. This palletizer type uses a continuous motion flow divider that guides the goods into the desired area on the layer forming platform.

Robotic palletizers were introduced in the early 1980s and have an end of arm tool (end effector) to grab the product from a conveyor or layer table and position it onto a pallet. Both conventional and robotic palletizers can receive product at a high elevation, typically 7–10.33 feet (2.13–3.15 m), or low "floor level" elevation of 2.5–3.0 feet (0.76–0.91 m). The end of arm tooling has evolved in recent years to accommodate a variation of pack pattern and package types, including cases, bags, pails, drums, and bottles.

== Mixed case palletizing ==
Mixed case palletizing is a real-world application variant of the 3D bin packing problem, where the goal is to stack mixed size cases onto a pallet in such a way it optimizes the space use i.e., stack as many cases onto a minimum amount of pallets. Although widespread applications in logistics exist, it remains a challenging problem, and stacking of mixed size products still largely involves manual labour.

In practice, palletization planning software generates stacking patterns for mixed-size cases using three-dimensional 3d bin-packing models with practical constraints such as vertical support, load-bearing limits, interlocking patterns and handling & carrier rules; these tools can guide both robotic palletizers and human operators.

Mixed case palletizing is subject to additional challenges as it not only requires robotics to grab the oncoming item i.e., determine the position of the product and robot kinematics to actually pick it up, but also to determine the size and optimal placement position on the pallet. In recent years, some research has used deep reinforcement learning, where robotic agents aim to learn an optimal placement position by stacking many pallets in simulation. Some works apply there learned model in real-world environments.

== See also ==
- Unit load
- Pallet inverter
- Stretch wrap
- Drum handler
- Paper pallet
