= Paper pallet =

Pallet made from paperboard

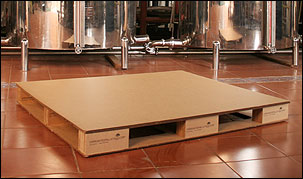
A block-style corrugated pallet

Different sizes of corrugated pallets with paper cores elements

A paper pallet or ecopallet is a shipping or display pallet made from paperboard.

== Construction ==
Paper shipping pallets come in corrugated fiberboard, partial wood decks or engineered with laminated paperboard. Some are made of paperboard composite honeycomb. Several designs have been developed.

== See also ==
- Unit load
