= ISPM 15 =

Standard for treating wood products

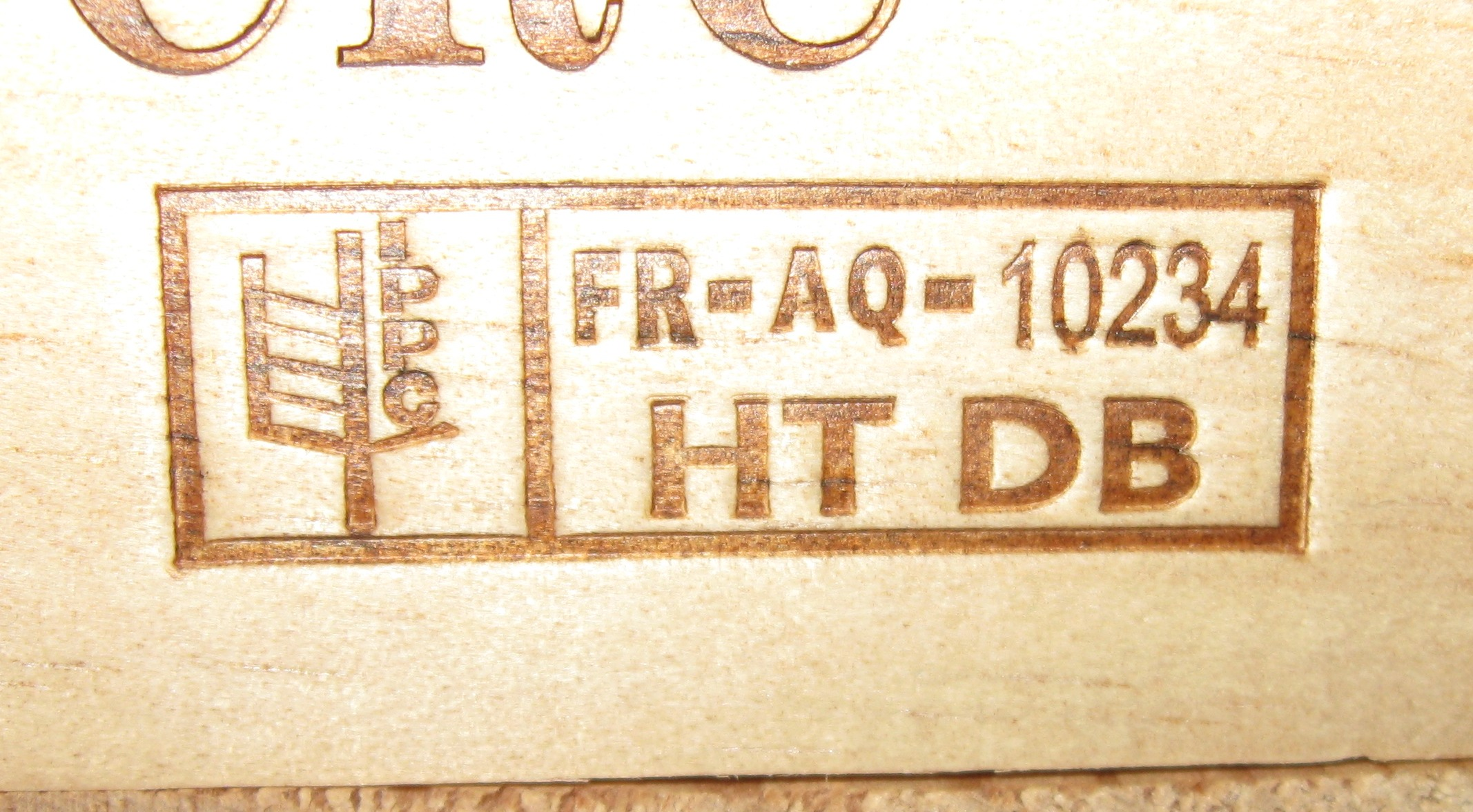
A photo of the IPPC seal on a wine shipping crate

International Standards For Phytosanitary Measures No. 15 (ISPM 15) is an International Phytosanitary Measure developed by the International Plant Protection Convention (IPPC) that directly addresses the need to treat wood materials of a thickness greater than 6mm, used to ship products between countries. Its main purpose is to prevent the international transport and spread of disease and insects that could negatively affect plants or ecosystems. ISPM 15 affects all wood packaging material (pallets, crates, dunnage, etc.) and requires that they be debarked and then heat treated or fumigated with methyl bromide, and stamped or branded with a mark of compliance. This mark of compliance is colloquially known as the "wheat stamp". Products exempt from the ISPM 15 are made from an alternative material, like paper, plastic or wood panel products (i.e. OSB, hardboard, and plywood).

== ISPM 15 revision ==
The Revision of ISPM No. 15 (2009) under Annex 1, requires that wood used to manufacture ISPM 15 compliant Wood Packaging must be made from debarked wood not to be confused with bark free wood. ISPM 15 was updated to adopt the bark restriction regulations proposed by the European Union in 2009. Australia held out for approximately one year with more stringent bark restrictions before conforming July 1, 2010

=== Debarked wood packaging ===
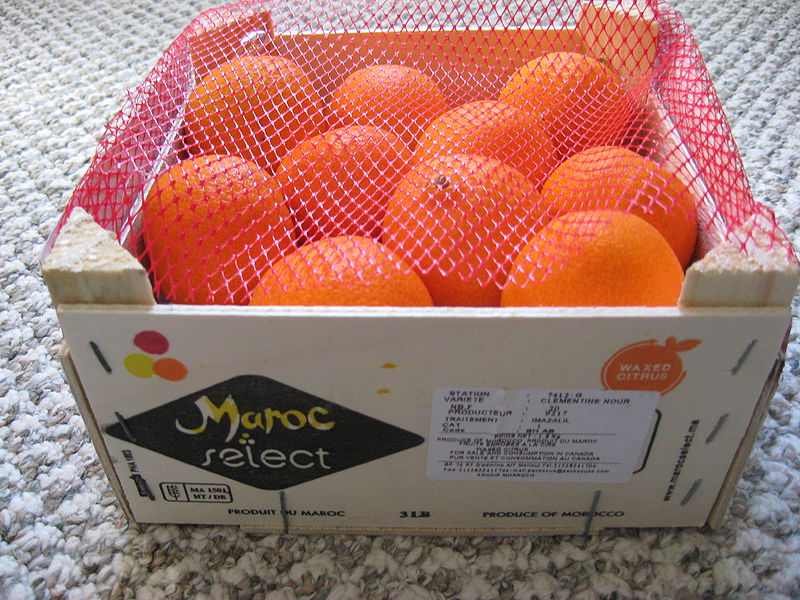
Wooden crate of clementines (mandarins) from Morocco, showing the ISPM 15 logo in the lower-left corner (MA for Morocco, from the French "Maroc") in 2010.

Wood packaging materials must be debarked prior to being heat treated or fumigated to meet ISPM 15 regulations. The debarking component of the regulation is to prevent the re-infestation of insects while lumber is sitting to be manufactured, or even after it has been manufactured. The official definition for debarked lumber according to the ISPM 15 Revision (2009) is:

"Irrespective of the type of treatment applied, wood packaging material must be made of debarked wood. For this standard, any number of visually separate and clearly distinct small pieces of bark may remain if they are: - less than 3 cm in width (regardless of the length) or - greater than 3 cm in width, with the total surface area of an individual piece of bark less than 50 square cm."

=== Argument for bark removal ===
The post-treatment levels of infestation (with and without bark) compared with pre-treatment levels are as follows. Overall, from the studies presented there is either: a) no significant difference between infestation levels of treated and untreated wood; or b) differences identified are related to the species of insect which may prefer treated or untreated wood. Supporting information from a North American study (IFQRG 2005-27) is summarized in the table below Data are numbers of beetles per cm^{2}:

Bark Size	Bark beetle (Control)	Bark Beetle (HT)	Bark Borer (Control)	Bark Borer (HT)
25 cm^{2}	0.01	0.0035	0.0133	0.0064
100 cm^{2}	0.005	0.01	0.0086	0.015
100% Coverage	0.0087	0.012	0.0118	0.0137

=== ISPM Marking ===
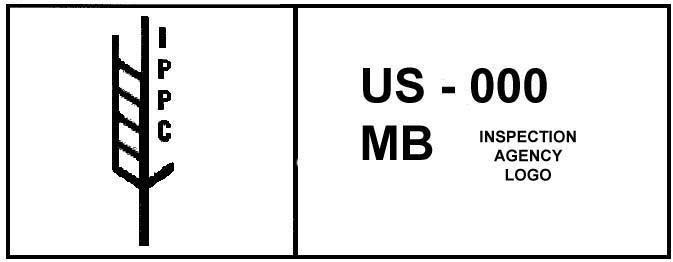
Sample ISPM logo showing the MB for methyl bromide treatment of the wood.

- IPPC certification symbol.
- XX: represents the two-letter ISO country code or ISO 3166-1 alpha-2 code (e.g. AU for Australia, US for United States, NZ for New Zealand, GB for United Kingdom).
- Inspection Agency Logo: represents the unique certification number issued to NPPOs (regulating agencies that oversee the individual wood packaging manufacturers). Inclusion of this certification number ensures that the wood packaging material can be traced back to the NPPO/auditing agency.
- 000: represents the unique certification number issued to the treatment provider and/or manufacturer. Inclusion of this certification number ensures that the wood packaging material can be traced back to the treatment provider and/or the manufacturer.
- YY: represents the treatment applied to the wood packaging material:
  - HT is the code for heat treatment to a minimum of 56 °C (133 °F) for a minimum of 30 minutes.
  - MB is the code for methyl bromide fumigation.
- DUN: represents the code for when the solid wood material is used for dunnage. The "DUN" Dunnage code is not applied to manufactured wood packaging, only loose lumber/timbers to help secure products being shipped.
- DB: represents that the wood has been debarked. This is not frequently displayed on the mark as debarking is a required step of receiving the ISPM 15 mark and therefore is assumed.

The ISPM 15 compliant stamp may include further information as producers and suppliers may choose to include additional information for identification purposes.

=== Dunnage Marking ===
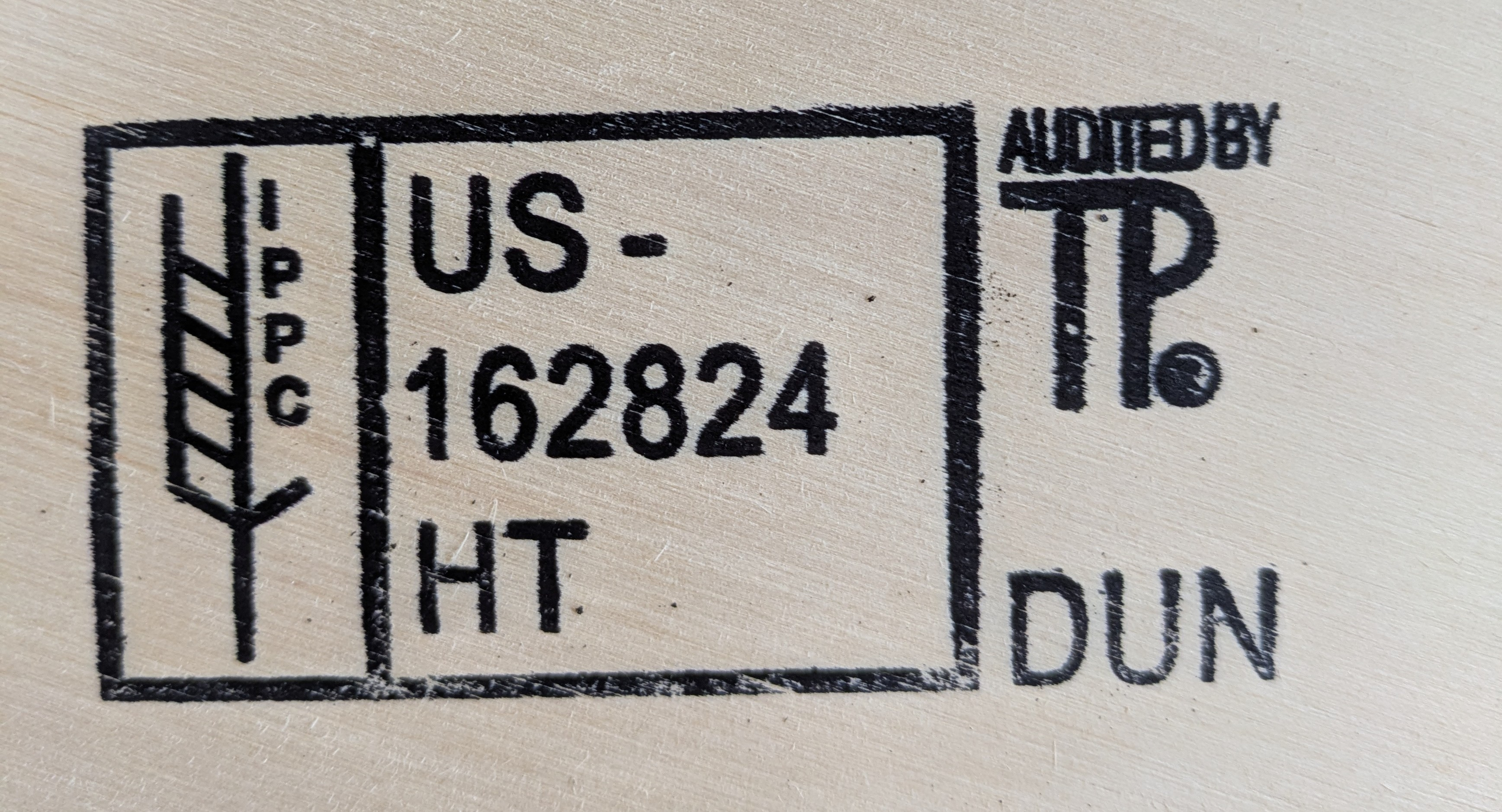
Sample ISPM 15 marking with dunnage designation.

Under ISPM 15, wood packaging used as dunnage may be marked differently from standard wood packaging materials such as pallets or crates. While both types of material must receive an approved phytosanitary treatment, ISPM 15 permits treated dunnage to bear a distinct dunnage mark. This mark uses the same basic components as a standard ISPM 15 stamp (country code, producer or treatment provider code, and treatment identifier), but may include the optional designation “DUN” to indicate that the material is intended specifically for use as dunnage. The dunnage mark does not change the required treatment; it simply identifies the wood as loose blocking and bracing rather than a manufactured packaging unit.

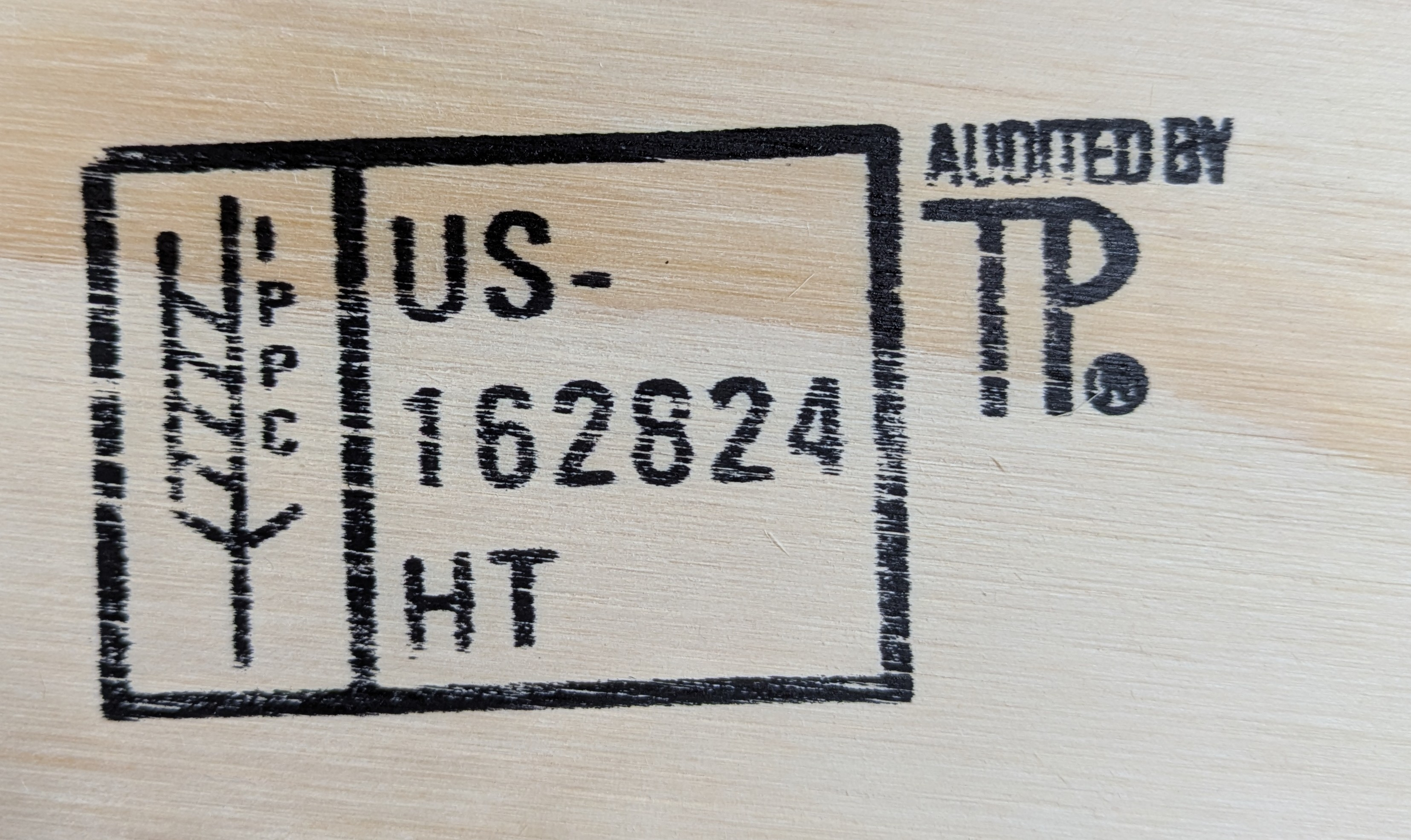
Sample ISPM 15 marking without dunnage designation.

Receiving a “DUN” designation does not alter the phytosanitary treatment requirements; the wood must still be treated using an approved ISPM 15 method. However, the designation affects how the material is intended to be used. A standard ISPM 15 mark indicates that a manufactured wood packaging unit meets all applicable ISPM 15 requirements as a complete item. By contrast, a “DUN” mark identifies an individual piece of treated wood intended for use as loose dunnage, rather than as part of a constructed packaging unit.

== Internationally accepted types of treatment ==
- HT (Heat Treatment) - The wood needs to be heated until its core reaches 56 °C for at least 30 minutes.
  - Steady Heat Treatment (HT): Standard procedure conducted in heating chambers;
  - Kiln-dried (KD): Similar to the standard HT, but it also requires moisture's standards;
  - Mobile Heat Treatment (HT): Heat treatment conducted in heating chambers installed in trucks. Allows the treatment to be done anywhere.
  - Portable Chamber Process (PCP - HT): Heat treatment conducted in portable chambers made of thermal fabric. Allows the treatment to be done anywhere, but with lower costs. The process' patent requirement belongs to the Brazilian company Fitolog Pest Control;
  - Fast Container Connector (FCC - HT): Heat treatment conducted directly in containers by a mobile heating unit. It is a simplified variation of PCP. Ideal for ports and terminals.
- MB (Methyl Bromide) - Requires to completely fill an area with gaseous pesticide (methyl bromide).
  - Container Fumigation: The container where the wooden packaging is placed is completely filled with Methyl Bromide. After a 24-hour quarantine, the container is aerated and the wood/cargo is released;
  - Tent Fumigation: The wooden packaging is covered with a specific type of tent, sealed to the ground with weight. The tent is completely filled with methyl bromide. After a 24-hour quarantine, the tent is removed and the wood/cargo is released;

== Exemptions from ISPM 15 ==
Not all packaging material must be treated to qualify to be used as shipping or packaging material. Here is a list of materials which are not required to be treated and are exempt from ISPM 15 laws and regulations.

- Plastic Pallets - these are most often made from either polypropylene or polyethylene plastic resin.
- Corrugated Pallets - these are produced using wood pulp, glue and high heat.
- Presswood or Molded-Wood Pallets - these are made under high temperature and pressure using glue and solely (recovered) wood chips or sawdust.
- Composite Wooden Pallet Blocks - these are made under high temperature and pressure using glue and solely (recovered) wood chips.
- Plywood, OSB or Processed Wood - wood packaging made of processed wood material. These include particle board, veneer that has been created using glue, heat or pressure.
- Wood Thinner than 6mm - any raw wood that is 6mm (0.24 inches) or less in thickness is exempt. This often applies to thin veneers or light crating components.
- Barrels for Wine & Spirits - This is a specific exemption because the manufacturing process for barrels (which involves heating/toasting) effectively treats them.

== Countries participating in ISPM 15 ==
Although this is only a reference, confirmation with the export authority when exporting to another country is required. This is a complete list as of July 1, 2010.

Countries and their approximate ISPM 15 Adoption Date:

- Algeria April 2017
- Argentina: June 2006
- Australia: September 2004; Complete Adoption: July 2010
- Bolivia: July 2005
- Brazil: June 2005
- Bulgaria: Jan 2006
- Canada: September 2005 (US-Canada exemption) although Canada does ask that the stamp be included and withholds the right to quarantine any and all shipments that do not have it.
- Chile: June 2005
- China: Jan 2006
- Colombia: September 2005
- Costa Rica: Mar 2006
- Cuba: Oct 2008
- Dominican Republic: July 2006
- Ecuador: September 2005
- Egypt: Oct 2005
- European Union: Mar 2005
  - Austria
  - Belgium
  - Bulgaria
  - Croatia
  - Cyprus
  - Czech Republic
  - Denmark
  - Estonia
  - Finland
  - France
  - Germany
  - Greece
  - Hungary
  - Ireland
  - Italy
  - Latvia
  - Lithuania
  - Luxembourg
  - Malta
  - Netherlands
  - Poland
  - Portugal
  - Romania
  - Slovakia
  - Slovenia
  - Spain
  - Sweden
- Guatemala: September 2005
- Honduras: Feb 2006
- India: Nov 2004
- Indonesia: September 2009
- Israel: June 2009
- Jamaica: January 2011
- Japan: Apr 2007
- Jordan: Nov 2005
- Kenya: Jan 2006
- Lebanon: Mar 2006
- Malaysia: Jan 2010
- Mexico: September 2005
- New Zealand: April 2003
- Nicaragua: Feb 2006
- Nigeria: September 2004
- Norway: July 2008
- Oman: Dec 2006
- Paraguay: June 2005
- Peru: Mar 2005
- Philippines: June 2005
- Saudi Arabia: February 2009
- Serbia: June 2005
- Seychelles: Mar 2006
- South Africa: Jan 2005
- South Korea: June 2005
- Sri Lanka: Mar 2004
- Switzerland: Mar 2005
- Syria: April 2006
- Thailand: February 2010
- Taiwan: Jan 2009
- Ethiopia 2006
- Trinidad & Tobago: July 2010
- Turkey: Jan 2006
- United Kingdom: Mar 2005 (EU member at the time)
- United States: September 2005
- Ukraine: Oct 2005
- Venezuela: June 2005
- Vietnam: June 2005

== See also ==
- ASTM D6253 Treatment and/or Marking of Wood Packaging Materials
