= Wulftec International =

Packaging Company

Wulftec International Inc.
- Industry: Manufacturing
- Founded: July 1990
- Headquarters: Ayer's Cliff, Quebec, Canada,
- Area served: Worldwide
- Owner: Duravant LLC

Wulftec International Inc. is a Canadian packaging company specialized in semi-automatic and automatic stretch wrapping machines, strapping systems and conveyor systems. It is a Duravant Operating Company; a global engineered equipment company.

Wulftec International Inc. has been a member of the PMMI since 1999.

== History ==
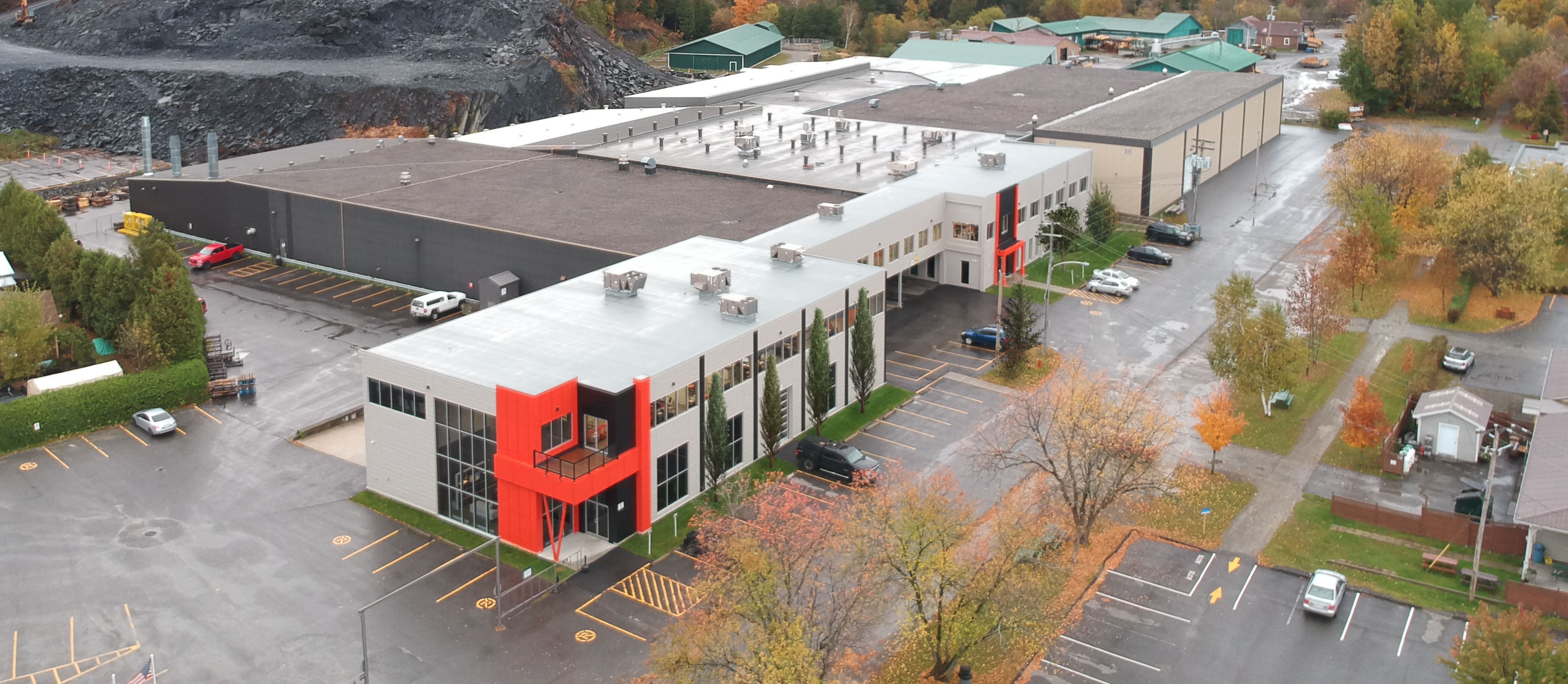
Wulftec plant in Ayer's Cliff, Québec

In 1990, Wolfgang Geisinger acquired Ayer's Cliff Industries Ltd, a local machine shop from Ayer's Cliff, Quebec and founded Wulftec International Inc. The first stretch wrapper was manufactured the following year. In 2002, M.J. Maillis Group announced the acquisition of Wulftec International Inc., the leading manufacturer of stretch wrapping machines in Canada.

In November 2005, Wulftec International Inc. announced an investment of $1.5 million to further increase productivity. The investment involved a major expansion of Wulftec's plant in Ayer's Cliff, increasing the total surface area from 110,000 square feet to 136,000 square feet.

In June 2014, Wulftec International Inc. announced the injection of over $1 million into its manufacturing plant to accommodate its growing business. This amount signaled funded the construction of a new operations area of 10,000 square feet to the Ayer's Cliff plant, an addition which brought the total surface area of the plant to 146,000 square feet. In 2016, Wulftec International Inc. invested another $2.2 million in the Ayer's Cliff plant.

In July 2018 a 26,000 square feet was announced, and in December, Wulftec International Inc. was sold to Duravant, a global engineered equipment company

== Products ==
=== Turntables ===
At the end of 2004, Wulftec International introduced the SMART Series to replace the WHP and WLP semi-automatic turntables. The SMART series is modular in design.

In fall 2008, Wulftec International standardized the WCA automatic turntable series on the same basis; merging the WCA-150 and the WCA-200 under a unique name: the WCA-SMART.

=== Rotary arms ===
Wulftec International uses 25" ring GEAR bearing with pinion GEAR drive for unbeatable strength and durability.

=== Orbital stretch wrapping ===
Orbital stretch wrapping was first introduced by Wulftec International in 2001 with the WRWA-200. The WRWA-200 strength and reliability come from its heavy duty structural steel construction and the heavy-duty ring bearing gearbelt drive system similar to the one used for crane and excavators. In 2011 the WRW-SPIN, a downsized version of the WRWA-200, was introduced, opening new markets for this type of machine.

=== Strapping systems ===
The Maillis name has been recognized in the strapping industry in Europe for more than 40 years. In 2004, Maillis moved its production of high-end machinery for North America to Maillis Strapping Systems, in Fountain Inn, South Carolina. There, with domestic sourcing of off-the-shelf components, including Allen Bradley controls, Maillis Strapping Systems is producing strapping systems suited to the North American market. In 2010, the production of all strapping machinery was moved to the Wulftec facility in Ayer's Cliff, Quebec.

=== Conveyors ===
Wulftec International has built conveyors for many years and came up with multiple conveyor solutions for all types of industries. Over the years, Wulftec International has built various customized conveyors: rollers, chains, belt and v-shaped to name a few. Wulftec also offers additions for its conveyors, like pop-ups, centering devices, elevating sections, turn crosses, and index tables.
