= Material-handling equipment =

Machinery and equipment used for transporting objects and materials

Material-handling equipment (MHE) is mechanical equipment used for the movement, storage, control, and protection of materials, goods and products throughout the process of manufacturing, distribution, consumption, and disposal. The different types of equipment can be classified into four major categories: transport equipment, positioning equipment, unit load formation equipment, and storage equipment.

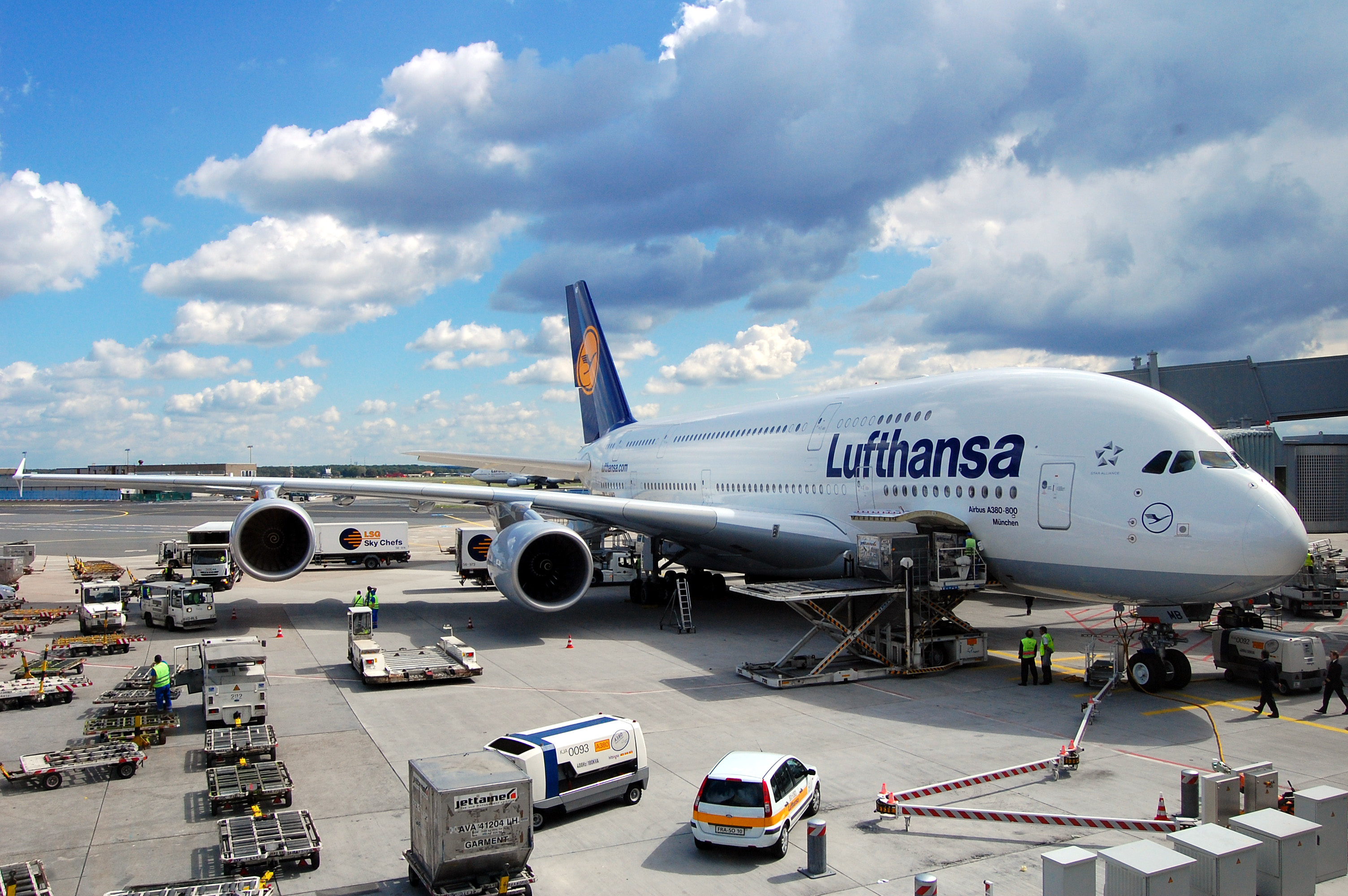
Loading and removing cargo from a Lufthansa Airbus A380 at Frankfurt Airport.

== Transport equipment ==
Transport equipment moves material from one location to another (e.g., between workplaces, between a loading dock and a storage area, etc.). The major subcategories of powered transport equipment are conveyors, cranes, and industrial trucks. Material can also be transported manually using no equipment or with the assistance of manual devices .

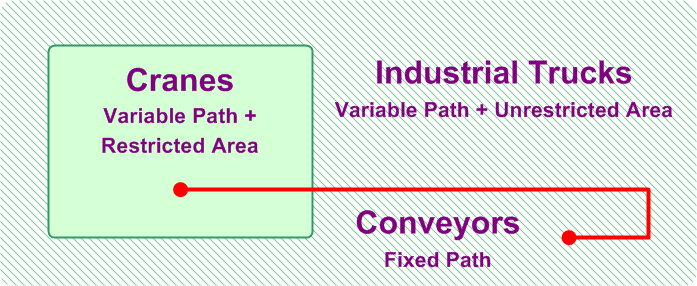
Difference between use of conveyors, cranes, and industrial trucks for transport with respect to their path and area of operation.

=== Conveyors ===
Conveyors are used when material is to be moved frequently between specific points over a fixed path and when there is a sufficient flow volume to justify the fixed conveyor investment. Different types of conveyors can be characterized by the type of product being handled: unit load or bulk load; the conveyor's location: in-floor, on-floor, or overhead, and whether or not loads can accumulate on the conveyor. Accumulation allows intermittent movement of each unit of material transported along the conveyor, while all units move simultaneously on conveyors without accumulation capability. For example, while both the roller and flat-belt are unit-load on-floor conveyors, the roller provides accumulation capability while the flat-belt does not; similarly, both the power-and-free and trolley are unit-load overhead conveyors, with the power-and-free designed to include an extra track in order to provide the accumulation capability lacking in the trolley conveyor. Examples of bulk-handling conveyors include the magnetic-belt, troughed-belt, bucket, and screw conveyors. A sortation conveyor system is used for merging, identifying, inducting, and separating products to be conveyed to specific destinations, and typically consists of flat-belt, roller, and chute conveyor segments together with various moveable arms and/or pop-up wheels and chains that deflect, push, or pull products to different destinations.

=== Cranes ===
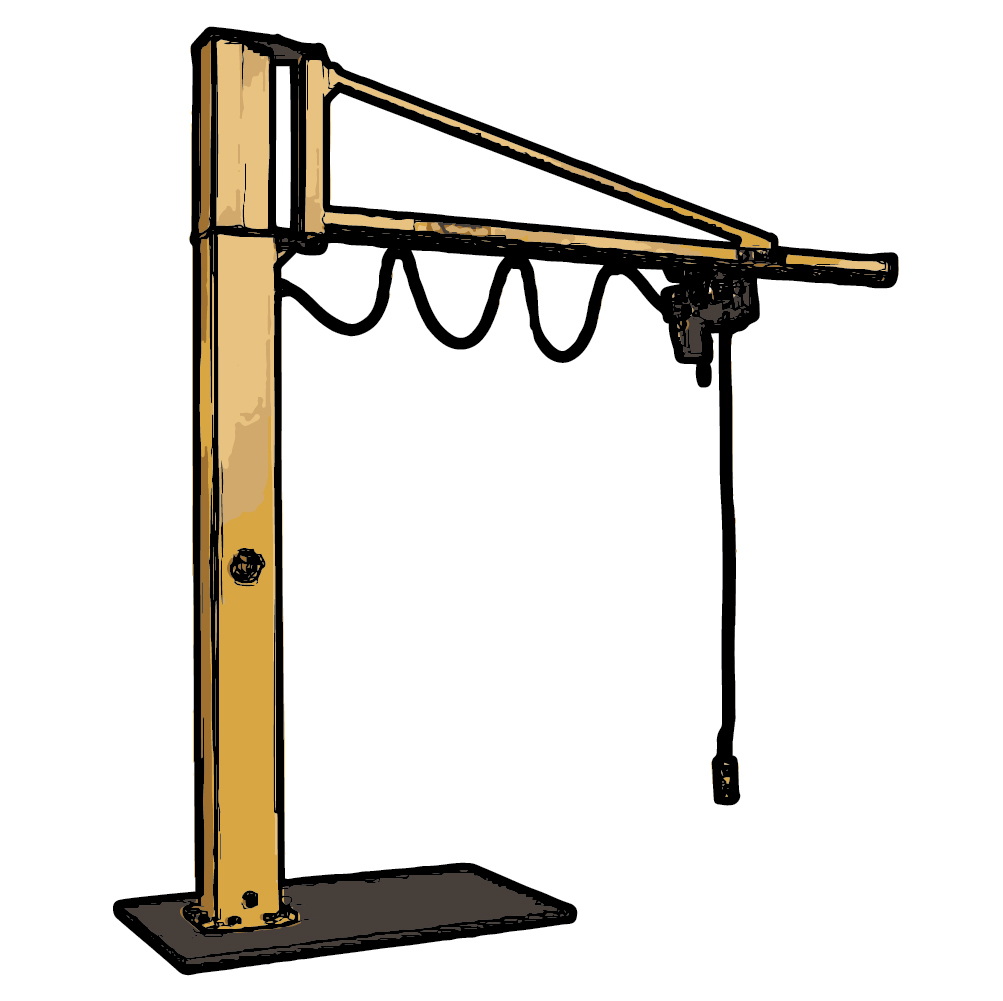
Jib crane

Cranes are used to transport loads over variable (horizontal and vertical) paths within a restricted area and when there is insufficient (or intermittent) flow volume such that the use of a conveyor cannot be justified. Cranes provide more flexibility in movement than conveyors because the loads handled can be more varied with respect to their shape and weight. Cranes provide less flexibility in movement than industrial trucks because they only can operate within a restricted area, though some can operate on a portable base. Most cranes utilize trolley-and-tracks for horizontal movement and hoists for vertical movement, although manipulators can be used if precise positioning of the load is required. The most common cranes include the jib, bridge, gantry, and stacker cranes.

=== Industrial trucks ===
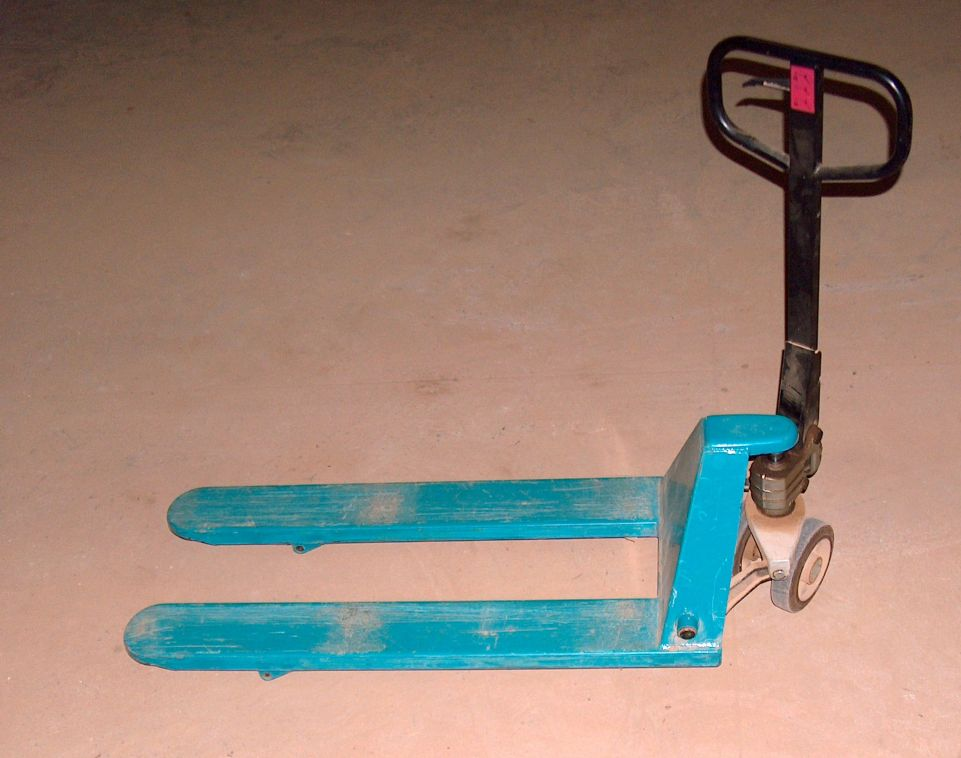
Pallet jack

Industrial trucks are powered trucks not licensed to travel on public roads (commercial trucks are licensed to travel on public roads). Industrial trucks move materials over variable paths primarily where there is insufficient and/or intermittent material flow volume such that conveyor use cannot be justified. Industrial trucks provide more flexibility in movement than conveyors and cranes because there are no restrictions on the area covered, and they can provide vertical movement if the truck has lifting capabilities. Industrial truck types can be characterized by:

- whether or not they have forks for handling pallets
- whether or not they are powered or manual related to lifting and travel capabilities
- allowing the operator to ride on the truck or requiring the operator walk with the truck during travel
- load stacking capability
- whether or not they can operate in narrow aisles.

==== Counterbalanced lift truck ====
A counterbalanced lift truck, sometimes referred to as a forklift truck or powered industrial truck (other attachments besides forks can be used), transports and stacks pallets, while the operator rides on the truck. Lift truck (and operator) weight behind the front wheels of truck counterbalances load weight (and weight of vehicle beyond front wheels); the front wheels act as a fulcrum or pivot point.

Narrow-aisle trucks usually require that the operator stand-up while riding in order to reduce the truck's turning radius.

==== Reach trucks ====
Reach trucks add to the counterbalance of the lift truck, mechanisms and outrigger arms that straddle and support a load.

==== Turret trucks ====
Turret trucks add to the counterbalance of the lift truck, forks that rotate during stacking, eliminating the need for the truck itself to turn in narrow aisles to access the load.

==== Order picker ====
Order pickers add to the counterbalance of the lift truck, a large operator platform that allows the platform to be lifted with the load, for less-than-pallet-load picking.

==== Automated guided vehicles ====
Automated guided vehicles (AGVs) are industrial trucks that can transport loads without requiring a human operator. AGVs are designed to ANSI B56.5.

==== Rough terrain forklift truck ====
Rough terrain forklift trucks have similar characteristics as the counterbalanced lift truck listed above but differ by fitting a larger diameter front (>12") and rear (>9") tire capable of traveling over unimproved surfaces or gravel. Rough terrain forklit trucks specifications at a minimum should meet the safety requirements in ANSI B56.6.

===== Variable Reach =====
Variable reach rough terrain forklift trucks should be designed to ANSI B55.1 and ISO 10896-1.

==== Electric tug ====
An electric tug is a small battery powered and pedestrian operated machine capable of either pushing or pulling a significantly heavier load than itself. The operation of industrial trucks is subject to safety regulations, including OSHA's 29 CFR 1910.176 for material handling.

=== Manual Handling Equipment ===
Commonly used to assist in moving smaller, lighter loads where larger equipment would struggle. Manual handling equipment such as dollies, pallet trucks, trolleys, and sack trucks can be an essential part of any material handling.

==== Hand Trucks ====
Hand trucks (including carts and dollies), the simplest type of industrial truck, cannot transport or stack pallets, is non-powered, and requires the operator to walk.

==== Pallet Jack ====
A pallet jack, which cannot stack a pallet, uses front wheels mounted inside the end of forks that extend to the floor as the pallet is only lifted enough to clear the floor for subsequent travel.

==== Transfer cart ====
Rail or wheel steered transfer carts are preferred for areas that do not have favourable conditions for the operation of forklifts. Rail transfer carts are carts that can move on the rail line. Wheel steered transfer carts can move independently of the route with battery powered energy systems.

==== Yard ramp ====
A yard ramp, sometimes called a mobile yard ramp, is a movable metal ramp for loading and unloading of vehicles. A yard ramp is placed at the back of a vehicle to provide access for forklifts to ascend the ramp. Using a yard ramp for vehicle loading or unloading allows the work to be carried out by a forklift.

== Positioning equipment ==
Positioning equipment handles material at a single location. It can be used at a workplace to feed, orient, load/unload, or otherwise manipulate materials so that they are in the correct position for subsequent handling, machining, transport, or storage. In many cases, positioning equipment is required for and can be justified by the ergonomic requirements of a task. Compared to manual handling, the use of positioning equipment can:

- raise worker productivity when handling frequency is high,
- improve product quality by limiting damage to materials and equipment when the item handled is heavy or awkward to hold and damage is likely through human error or inattention
- reduce fatigue and injuries when the environment is hazardous or inaccessible.

=== Lift / Tilt / Turn tables ===
Lift/tilt/turn tables reposition the workpiece so optimal accesibility and ergonomics can be achieved.

=== Hoists ===
Hoists reposition the workpiece in the vertical direction to offer optimal accessibility and ergonomics.

=== Balancers ===
Balancers allow operators to lift and lower their tools or objects with little to no force, offering improved accessibility and ergonomics.

=== Manipulators ===
Manipulators act as “muscle multipliers” by counterbalancing the weight of a load so that an operator lifts only a small portion (1%) of the load's weight, and they fill the gap between hoists and industrial robots: they can be used for a wider range of positioning tasks than hoists and are more flexible than industrial robots due to their use of manual control. They can be powered manually, electrically, or pneumatically, and a manipulator's end-effector can be equipped with mechanical grippers, vacuum grippers, electromechanical grippers, or other tooling.

=== Industrial robots ===
Industrial robots can complement operator work tasks by manipulating the work piece or handing the tools necessary for work to the operator.

== Unit load formation equipment ==
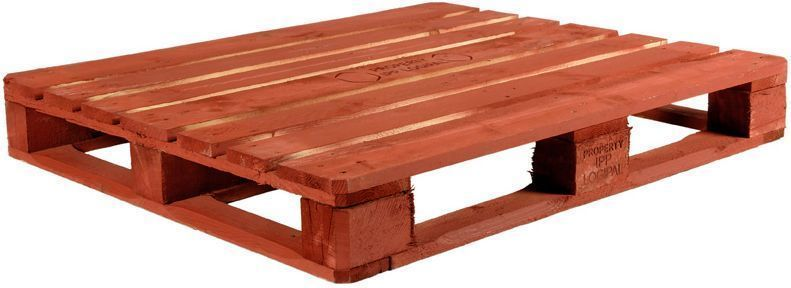
Four-way pallet

Unit load formation equipment is used to restrict materials so that they maintain their integrity when handled a single load during transport and for storage. If materials are self-restraining (e.g., a single part or interlocking parts), then they can be formed into a unit load with no equipment. Examples of unit load formation equipment include

=== Pallet ===
A pallet is a platform made of wood (the most common), paper, plastic, rubber, or metal with enough clearance beneath its top surface (or face) to enable the insertion of forks for subsequent lifting purposes.

=== Slipsheet ===
A slipsheet is a thick piece of paper, corrugated fiber, or plastic upon which a load is placed and has tabs that can be grabbed by special push/pull lift truck attachments. They are used in place of a pallet to reduce weight and volume, but loading/unloading is slower.

=== Skids ===
Skids are custom fabricated, modular platforms on which materials or plant equipment can be installed and later moved as needed.

=== Tote pans, bins / baskets, cartons, bags, and crates ===
These containers are typically small in size to allow bulk items to be moved by a person.

== Storage equipment ==
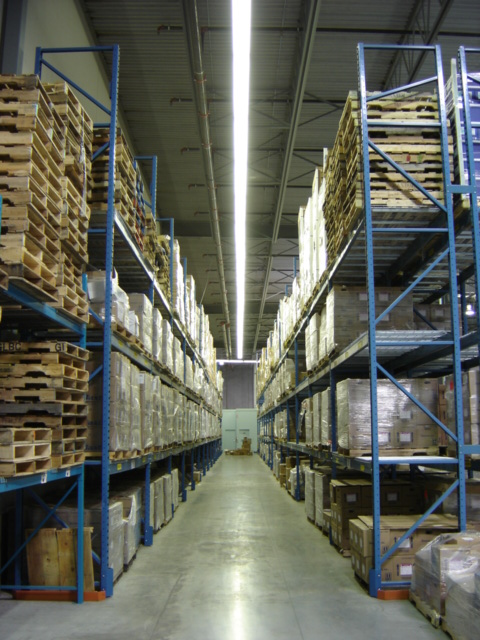
Single-deep pallet racks

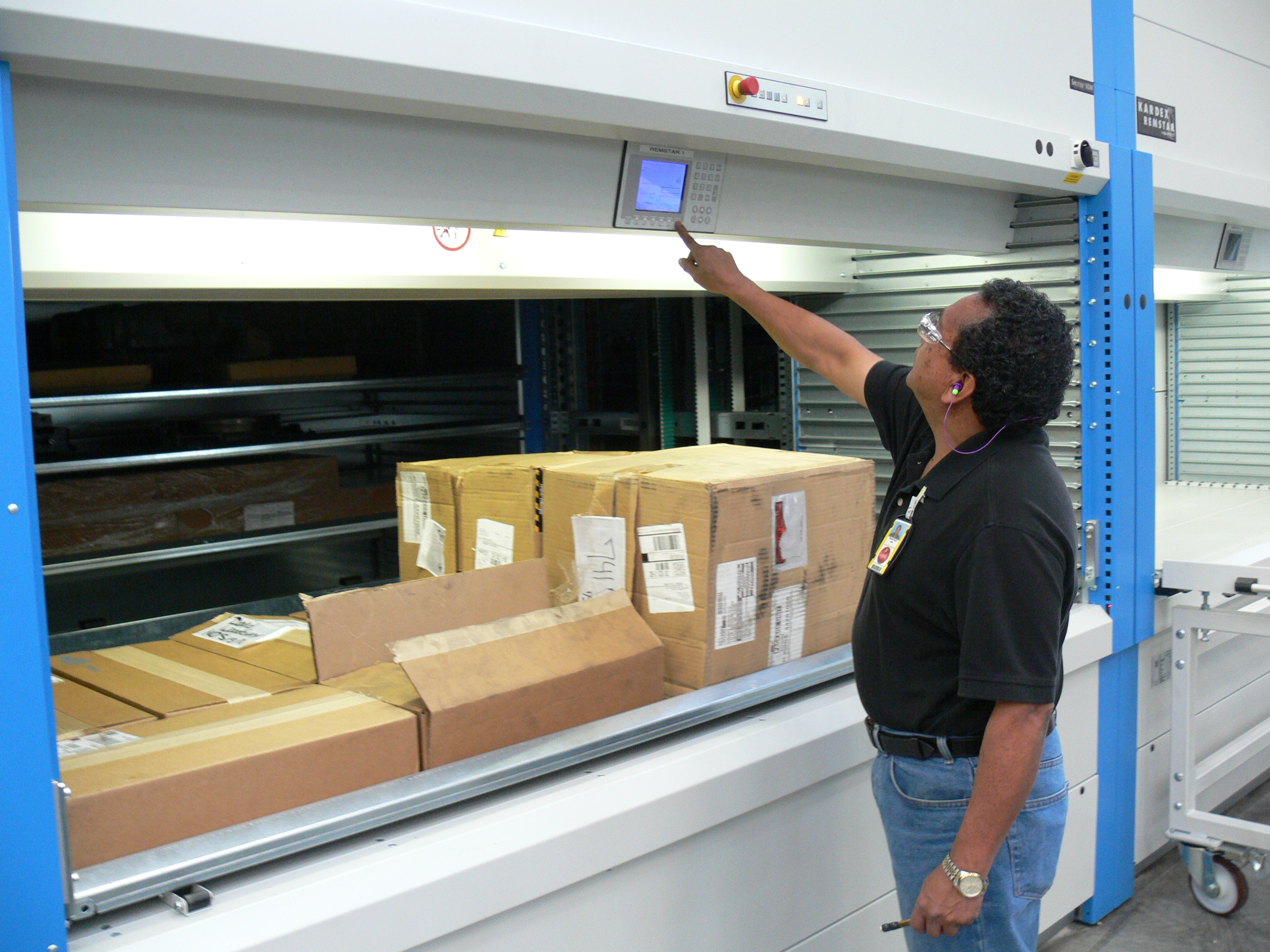
Vertical carousel

Storage equipment is used for holding or buffering materials over a period of time. The design of each type of storage equipment, along with its use in warehouse design, represents a trade-off between minimizing handling costs, by making material easily accessible, and maximizing the utilization of space (or cube). If materials are stacked directly on the floor, then no storage equipment is required, but, on average, each different item in storage will have a stack only half full; to increase cube utilization, storage racks can be used to allow multiple stacks of different items to occupy the same floor space at different levels. The use of racks becomes preferable to floor storage as the number of units per item requiring storage decreases. Similarly, the depth at which units of an item are stored affects cube utilization in proportion to the number of units per item requiring storage.

Pallets can be stored using single- and double-deep racks when the number of units per item is small, while pallet-flow and push-back racks are used when the units per item are mid-range, and floor-storage or drive-in racks are used when the number of units per item is large, with drive-in providing support for pallet loads that cannot be stacked on top of each other. Individual cartons can either be picked from pallet loads or can be stored in carton-flow racks, which are designed to allow first-in, first-out (FIFO) carton access. For individual piece storage, bin shelving, storage drawers, carousels, and A-frames can be used.

== Engineered systems ==
Engineered systems are automated solutions designed to streamline and optimize material handling processes. An automatic storage/retrieval system (AS/RS) is an integrated computer-controlled storage system that combines storage medium, transport mechanism, and controls with various levels of automation for fast and accurate random storage of products and materials.

== Identification and Control Equipment ==
Equipment used to collect and communicate the information that is used to coordinate the flow of materials within a facility and between a facility and its suppliers and customers. The identification of materials and associated control can be performed manually with no specialized equipment.

== See also ==
- Automated guided vehicle
- Automated storage and retrieval system
- Bulk material handling
- Caster
- Drum handler
- Electric track vehicle system
- Forklift truck
- Industrial robot
- Material handling
- Packaging machinery
- Pallet
- Pallet inverter
- Pallet racking
- Slip sheet
- Telescopic handler
- Warehouse
