= Extended core stretch wrapper =

Type of stretch film

Extended core stretch wrappers are rolls of stretch film that have their internal core extended beyond their film roll creating a handle by which film can be wrapped.

Extended core wrapping is the lowest initial investment stretch wrapping system as no machinery is purchased. This system provides little control over stretch and is hard on workers' hands. Because of this, many stretch wrap users opt for low cost hand wrappers such as "hand savers" or mechanical brake systems.

== Books ==
- Yam, K. L., "Encyclopedia of Packaging Technology", John Wiley & Sons, 2009, ISBN 978-0-470-08704-6
