= Temperature control =

Maintaining a desired system temperature

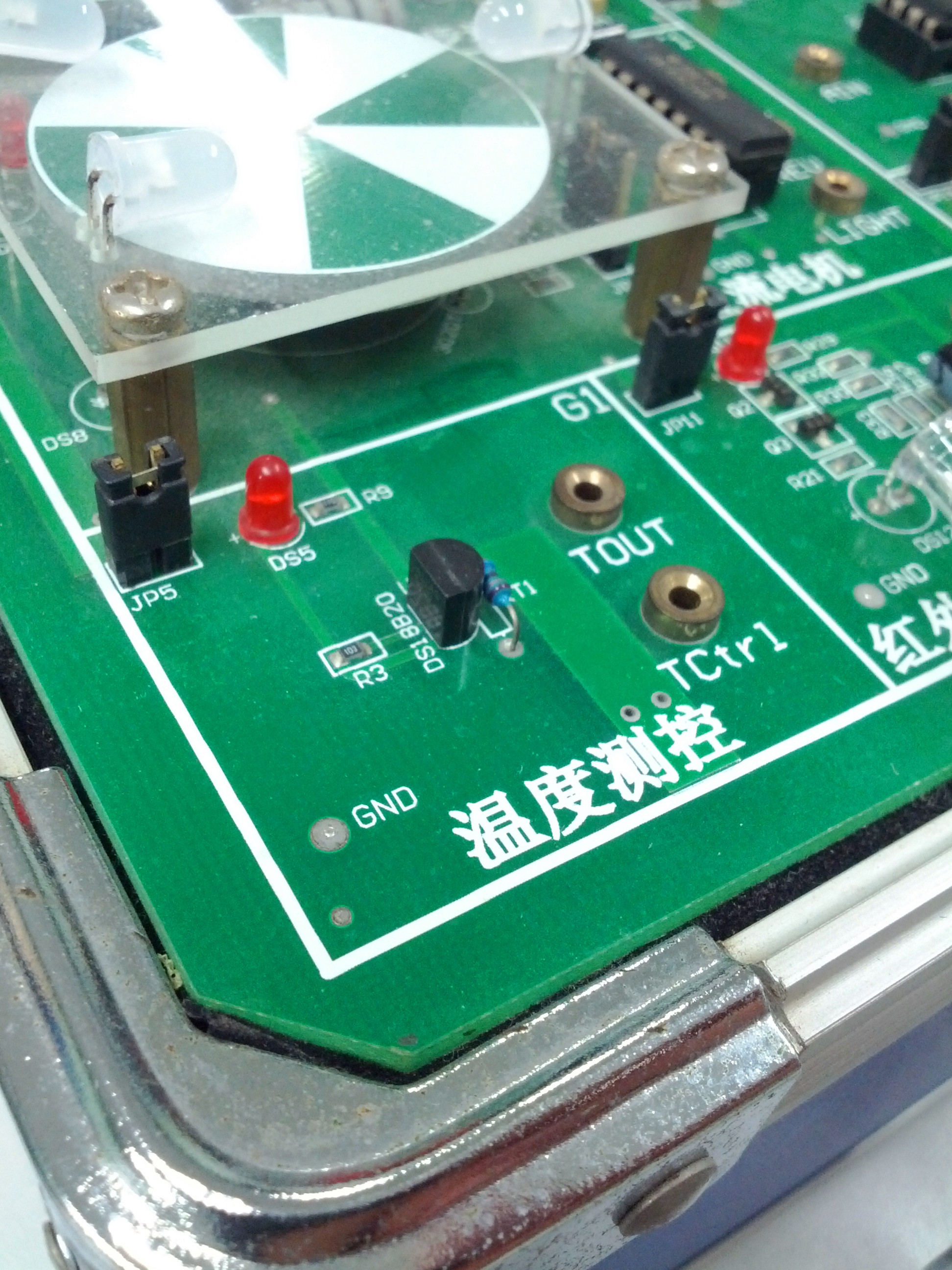
Temperature measuring and controlling module for microcontroller experiment

Temperature control is a process in which change of temperature of a space (and objects collectively there within), or of a substance, is measured or otherwise detected, and the passage of heat energy into or out of the space or substance is adjusted to achieve a desired temperature.

== Control loops ==
A home thermostat is an example of a closed control loop: It continuously measures the current room temperature and compares this to a desired user-defined setpoint, and controls a heater and/or air conditioner to increase or decrease the temperature to meet the desired setpoint.

Several types of control are possible:

- A very simple form us a thermostat that merely switches a heater or air conditioner either on or off, and temporary overshoot and undershoot of the desired average temperature must be expected.
- A more advanced thermostat may vary the amount of heating or cooling provided by the heater or cooler, depending on the difference between the required temperature (the setpoint) and the actual temperature. This is called proportional control, and minimizes overshoot and undershoot.
- Further enhancements using the accumulated error signal (integral) and the rate at which the error is changing (derivative) are used to form more complex PID controllers, which is the form usually seen in industrial settings and more advanced consumer products.

== Energy balance ==
An object's or space's temperature increases when heat energy moves into it, increasing the average kinetic energy of its atoms, e.g., of things and air in a room. Heat energy leaving an object or space lowers its temperature. Heat flows from one place to another (always from a higher temperature to a lower one) by up to three processes: conduction, convection and radiation:

- In conduction, energy is passed from one atom to another by direct contact.
- In convection, heat energy moves by conduction into some movable fluid (such as air or water) and the fluid moves from one place to another, carrying the heat with it. At some point the heat energy in the fluid is usually transferred to some other object by means conduction again. The movement of the fluid can be driven by negative buoyancy, as when cooler (and therefore denser) air drops and thus upwardly displaces warmer (less dense) air (natural convection), or by fans or pumps (forced convection).
- In radiation, the heated atoms make electromagnetic emissions absorbed by remote other atoms, whether nearby or at astronomical distance. For example, the sun radiates heat as both invisible and visible electromagnetic energy. What we know as light is but a narrow region of the electromagnetic spectrum.

If, in a place or thing, more energy is received than is lost, its temperature increases. If the amount of energy coming in and going out are exactly the same, the temperature stays constant—there is thermal balance, or thermal equilibrium.

== See also ==
- Automation, control systems using technology such that a process or procedure is performed with minimal human assistance
- Heat exchanger, system used to transfer heat between a source and a working fluid
- Moving bed heat exchanger, heat exchanger transferring heat between a fluid and a solid granular material using continuous downward flow past a surface
- Spacecraft thermal control, process of keeping all parts of a spacecraft within acceptable temperature ranges
- Thermodynamic equilibrium, state of thermodynamic system(s) where no net macroscopic flow of matter or energy occurs
