= ITW Mima Packaging Systems =

ITW Mima Packaging Systems logo

ITW Mima Packaging Systems is the European marketing division of ITW's Specialty Systems businesses, manufacturing fully automatic stretch wrapping machines in Finland, semi-automatic and automatic machines in Bulgaria and manufacturing film in Belgium and Ireland.

== Overview ==
Mima was founded in 1976 in the United States to manufacture stretch wrapping machinery. Mima was acquired by ITW in 1986. Alongside this, Matti Haloila started his own company in Finland and began manufacturing HaloilaHaloila - Etusivu semi-automatic stretch wrappers in 1976. In 1983, Haloila launched an automatic, rotating ring stretch wrapper with the brand name Octopus. Haloila became part of the Illinois Tool Works (ITW) in 1995, and shortly after this, ITW acquired the stretch film business from Mobil and ITW Mima Packaging System was formed. ITW Mima Packaging Systems manufacture stretch films in Belgium and Ireland and stretch wrappers in Bulgaria and Finland.

In 2006 Mima launched the Octopus Twin a wrapping machine capable of wrapping 150 pallets per hour. ITW Mima delivered their 3000th Octopus stretch wrapper in 2008.

The Octopus is also currently being manufactured for the US market in Canada by ITW Muller. Other Haloila’s wrapping machines include the Cobra, Ecomat and Rolle.

ITW Mima Packagings Systems is a member of the Process and Packaging Machinery Association (PPMA)
