= Telelift =

German automated intralogistics manufacturer in various sectors.

Telelift GmbH
- Trade name: TELELIFT
- Type: GmbH (Private company)
- Industry: Automated material handling Healthcare logistics
- Founded: 1964
- Headquarters: Maisach, Bavaria, Germany
- Area served: Worldwide
- Products: ETV(Electric Track Vehicle Systems), AGV, PTS(Pneumatic‌ Tube System), AWLS, AFWS(Automatic Food and Waste transport system)
- Brands: Unicar, Multilift, Unidrop
- Website: www.telelift-logistics.com

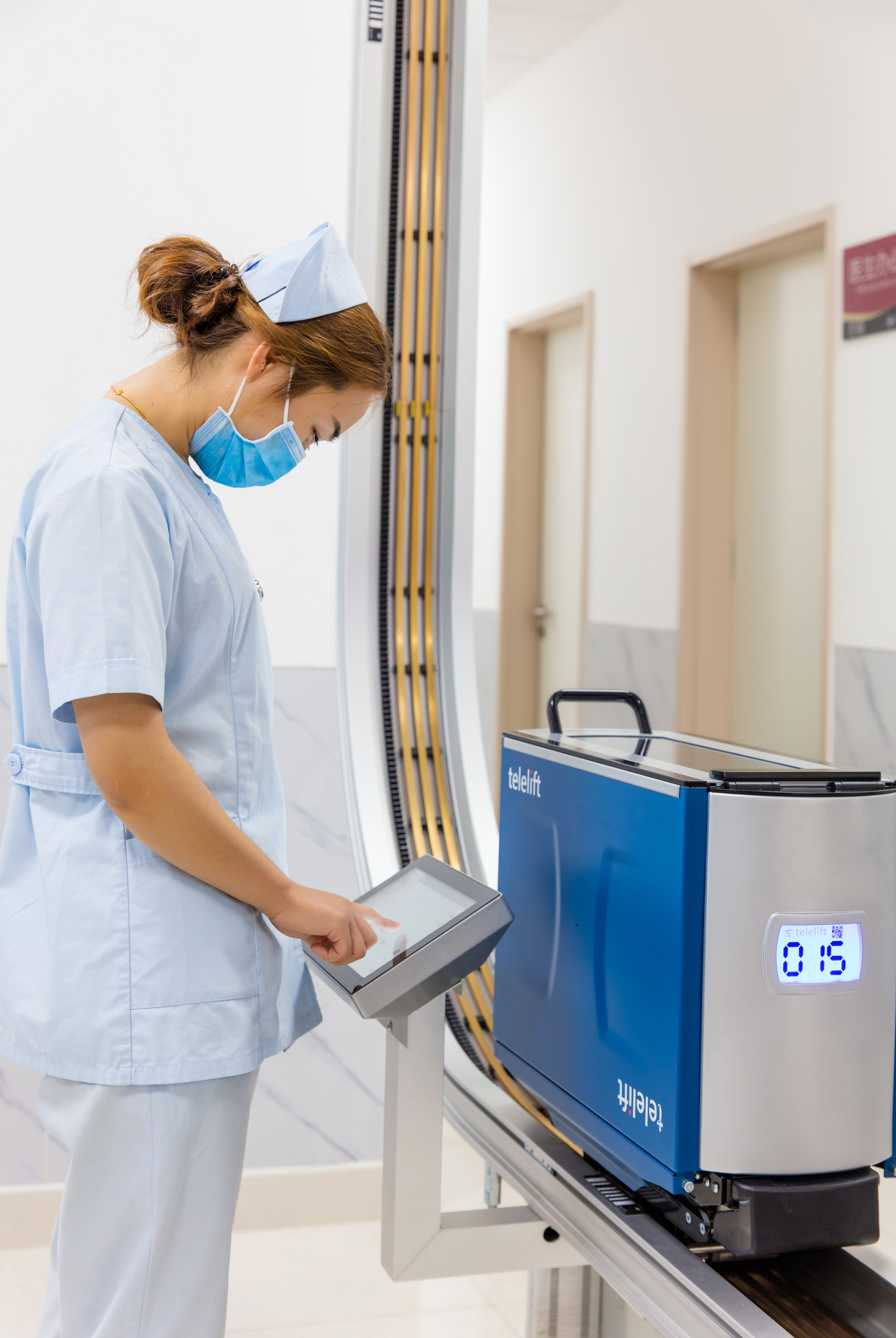
Typical application of Telelift in a hospital

Telelift GmbH is a German Manufacturer operating worldwide which develops and installs advanced logistics systems, notably Electric Track Vehicle (ETV) systems, for hospitals, libraries, industry- and security-related applications. The systems provide a transport automation of light materials handling and have no limits in number of operator stations for both sending, and receiving of goods, in closed and locked container vehicles.

Telelift has headquarters in Maisach, near Munich in Germany and three subsidiaries in Berlin, Stuttgart and Singapore.

== History ==
Telelift was founded in 1964 in Munich. In the same year, the first of numerous patents was granted for an electric track vehicle system. It has reached many places in areas/continents such as Europe, America, Asia, Middle East, and Australia/Oceania. A professional distribution brought hundreds of so-called "UniCar" systems to many hospitals, libraries, and administration buildings. HSBC headquarters for example in London and Hong Kong operate large Telelift systems with hundreds of transport trolleys.

Other product line are the AGV (automated guided vehicle system) called "UniVan" which is installed in dozens of hospitals in Europe and Asia, and pneumatic tube systems.

In 1989, Thyssen bought Telelift GmbH, integrated its own library automation system type "MultiLift" and added the Siemens track system type Simacom VT. In 1999, a Swiss company bought Telelift GmbH and integrated it into their healthcare solutions group. In 2012, Telelift GmbH was sold and is privately owned again.

To date, more than 1,500 Telelift systems have been installed in over 50 countries.

== Products ==
Telelift develops and produces conveying systems for transporting goods of up to 500 kg in buildings and production plants. All systems utilise a three-dimensional traffic routing, with 100% system monitoring and Industry 4.0 qualified implementation.

Healthcare has the largest market share. About 650 systems have been installed in hospitals, to increase hygiene standards and optimize the number of transportation staff.

Other markets are libraries with more than 250,000 books, administration buildings with security demand, and industry applications (automotive and food industries).

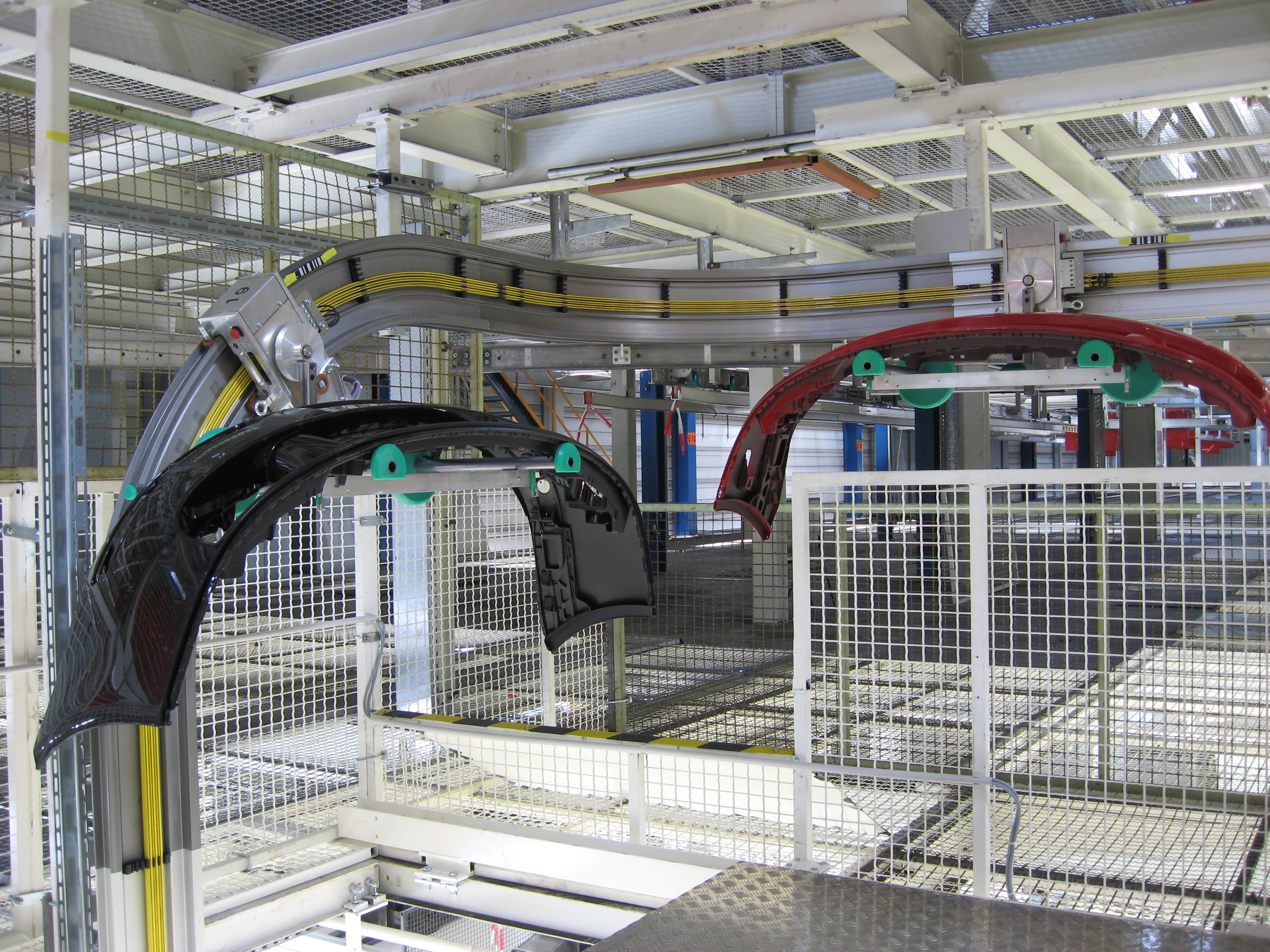
Modern 3D MultiCar system at Wolfsburg Volkswagen plant

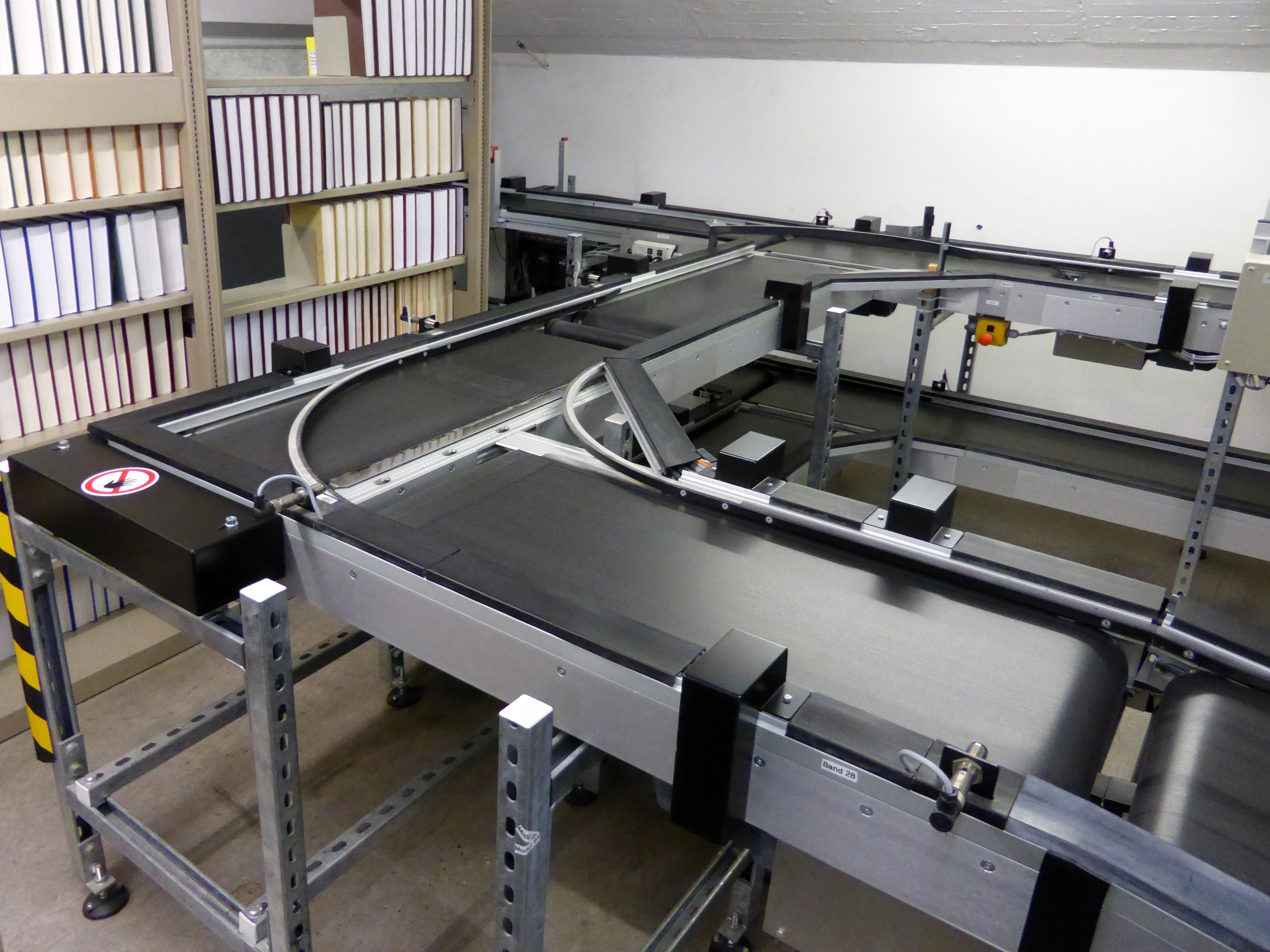
Conveyor belt for Books at Bavarian State Library

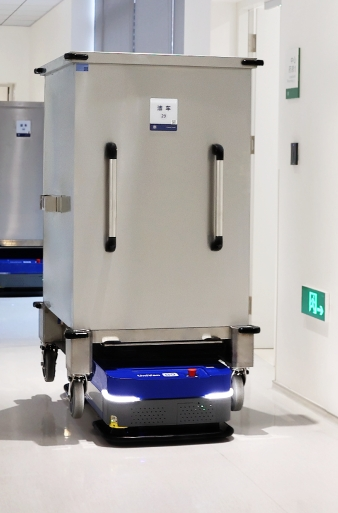
AGV in hospital

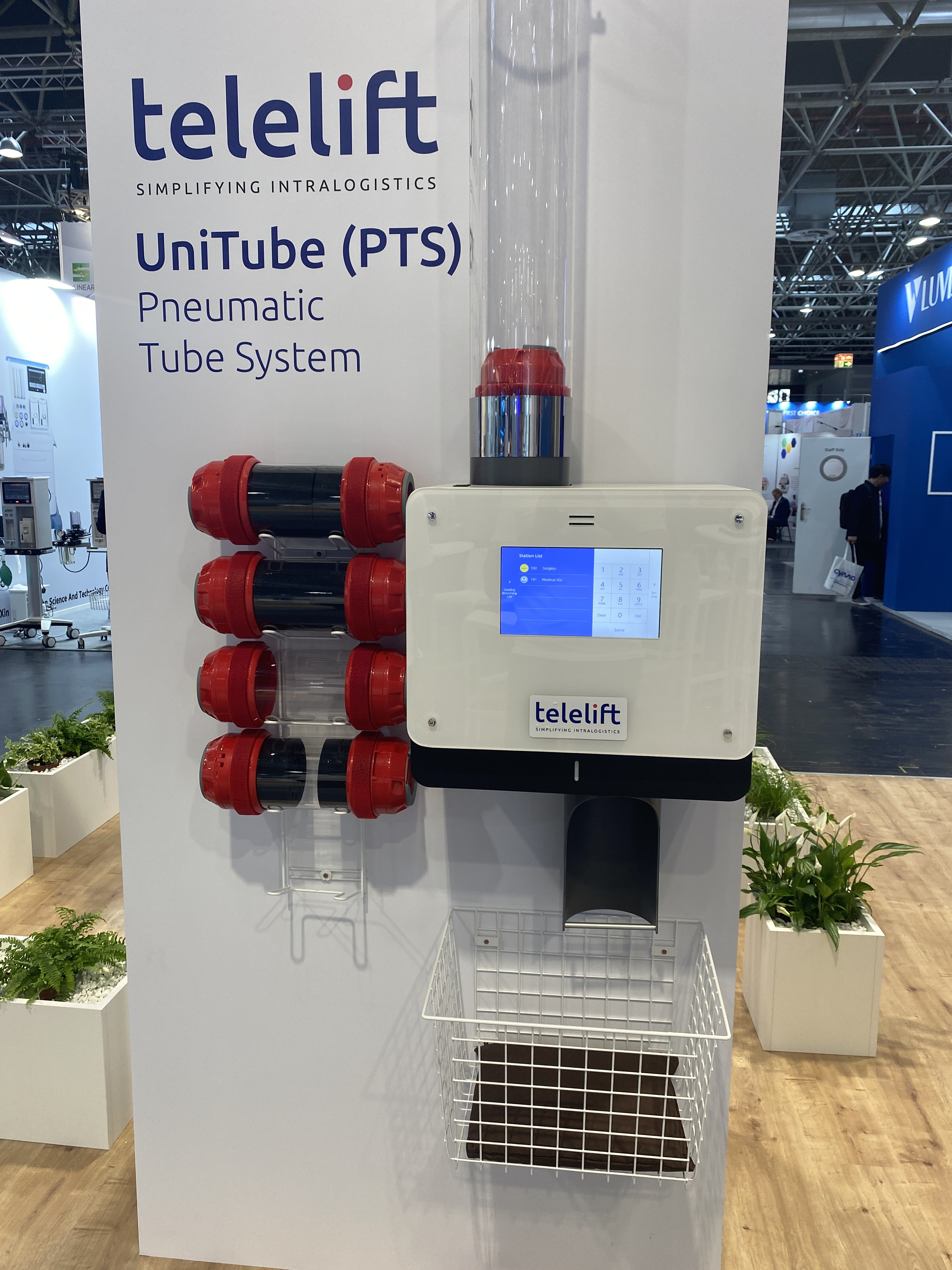
Pneumatic tube

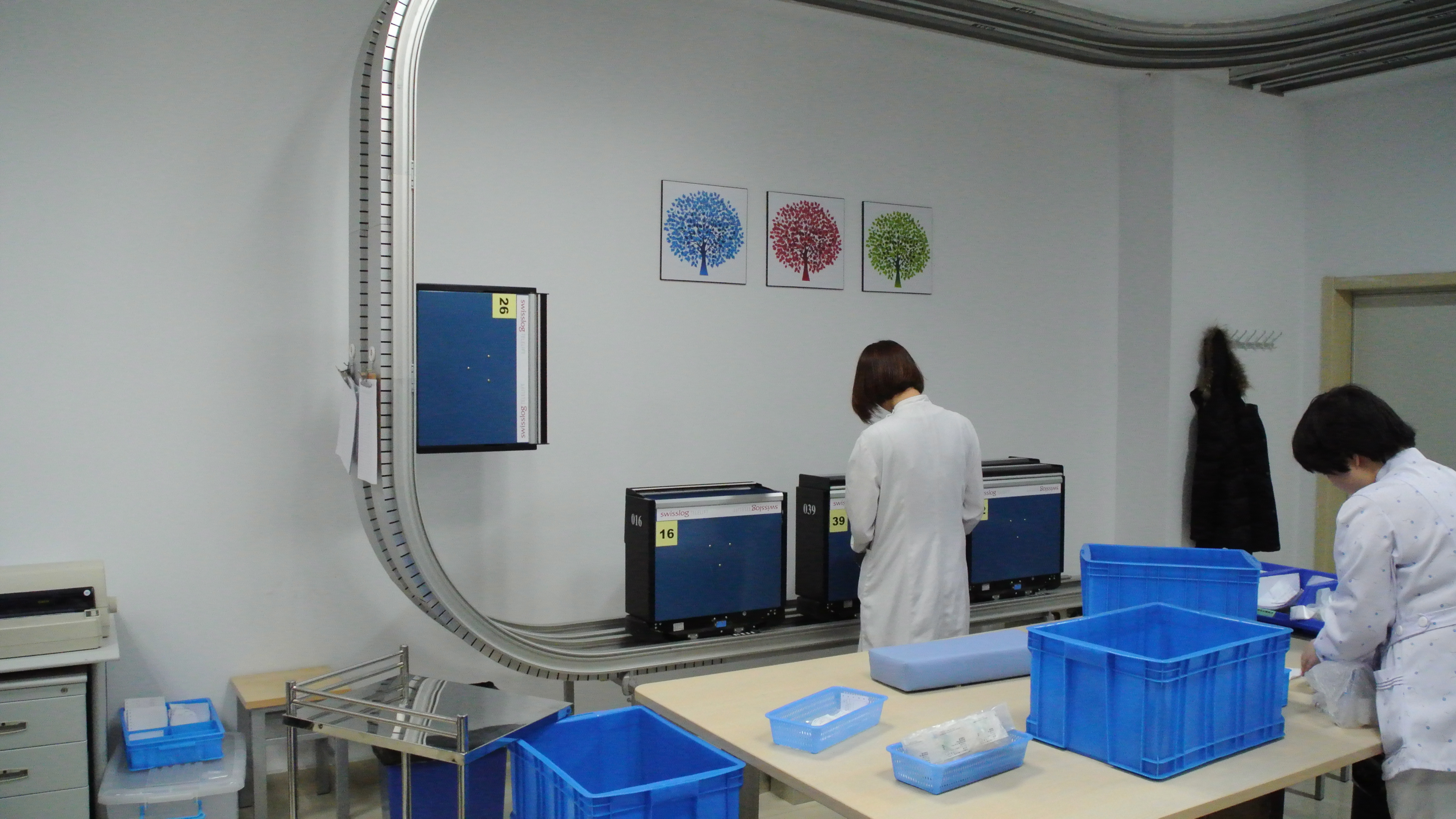
ETV-Hospital automated track transport systems
