= Pallet inverter =

Machine used to turn over pallets

A pallet inverter or pile turner is a machine that is used to turn over full pallet loads of packages or products. The term pallet inverter is also used to cover machines that turn the palletised load through 90 degrees only.

== Use ==
The reasons for needing to turn over a pallet are varied. The primary reason is to have access to the bottom of the load without having to manually unload all of the boxes or bags. If a pallet or slip sheet is damaged, it can be replaced by inverting the load, replacing it, and re-inverting the load. Sometimes a manufacturer simply needs to turn their products to stop their contents settling. In some industries, it is necessary to transfer goods from one type of pallet to another – for example, when plastic pallets are used for on-site storage and wooden pallets are used for shipping.

Some products require rapid freezing immediately after production and packaging. Processes can utilize freezer spacers between each tier of boxes on a pallet: these promote air flow for controlled and accelerated refrigeration. Prior to shipping, these spacers can be removed using a pallet inverter. This rotates the load ninety degrees to allow easy removal and reuse.

Pallet inverters can be built into production lines or be used as a stand-alone product.

== See also ==
- Bulk material handling
- Conveyor system
- Palletizer
- Slip sheet
