= Orbital stretch wrapper =

Packaging process

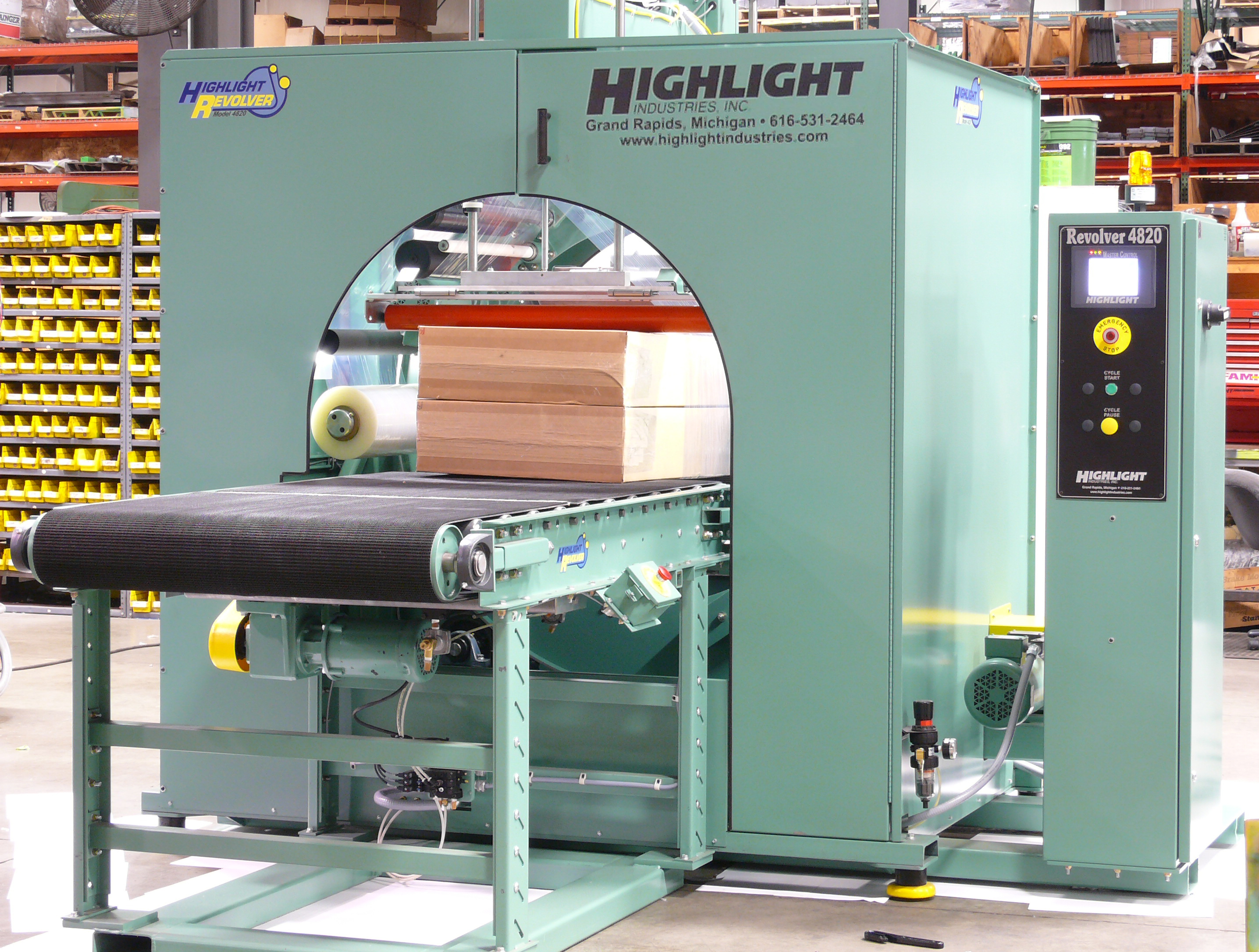
An orbital stretch wrapper

An orbital stretch wrapper is a means of applying stretchable plastic film to a load, consisting of a roll (or rolls) of stretch wrap supported on a vertical rotating ring and a means of passing a load through the ring's eye horizontally. Several designs are available.

The item or load can go through the ring on a conveyor or can be placed into the ring by a pallet truck. Small loads can be suspended within the rotating ring by hand. Stretch is achieved by creating tension between the load and film roll using a brake or gear ratio system.
