= Lineshaft roller conveyor =

Conveyor powered by a shaft beneath rollers

A lineshaft roller conveyor moves boxed produce at a distribution center.

A lineshaft roller conveyor or line-shaft driven live roller conveyor is a type of conveyor system powered by a shaft beneath rollers. These conveyors are suitable for light applications up to 50 kg (110 lb) such as cardboard boxes and tote boxes.

A single shaft runs below the rollers running the length of the conveyor. On the shaft are a series of spools, one spool for each roller. An elastic polyurethane o-ring belt runs from a spool on the powered shaft to each roller. When the shaft is powered, the o-ring belt acts as a chain between the spool and the roller making the roller rotate. The rotation of the rollers pushes the product along the conveyor. The shaft is usually driven by an electrical motor that is generally controlled by an electronic PLC (programmable logic controller). The PLC electronically controls how specific sections of the conveyor system interact with the products being conveyed.

Advantages of this conveyor are quiet operation, easy installation, moderate maintenance and low expense. Line-shaft conveyors are also extremely safe for people to work around because the elastic belts can stretch and not injure fingers should any get caught underneath them. Moreover, the spools will slip and allow the rollers to stop moving if clothing, hands or hair gets caught in them. In addition, since the spools are slightly loose on the shaft, they act like clutches that slip when products are required to accumulate (stop moving and bump up against each other. i.e. queue up). With the exception of soft bottomed containers like cement bags, these conveyors can be utilized for almost all applications.

A disadvantage of the roller lineshaft conveyor is that it can only be used to convey products that span at least three rollers, but rollers can be as small as 17 mm (0.67 in) in diameter and as close together as 18.5 mm (0.73 in). For items shorter than 74 mm (2.9 in), the conveyor belt system is generally used as an alternative option.

== See also ==
- Conveyor systems
- Conveyor belt
- Chain conveyor
- Line shaft
