= Tube chain conveyor =

A tube chain conveyor moves materials inside a tube, pulled by a chain. It offers a convenient way for conveying bulk material from one location to another, and also multi-axially. Tube chain conveyors are used for transporting, feeding, dosing, distributing and discharging pourable bulk materials.

== Construction ==
The material chosen for the transport discs screwed on support discs to a round link chain depends in particular on design parameters such as the material to be transported and the temperature. Tube chain conveyors transport material volumetrically from the inlet to the outlet inside the transport tube.

== Specification ==
The customer is responsible for the correctness of the bulk material and operational parameters on which the design is based, and has to ensure that these parameters are observed when the plant is in operation.

== Advantages ==
=== Cleanliness ===
The enclosed construction ensures that the material is transported in a dust free and non-polluting way. Self-cleaning is achieved by the technique applied as well as by the stations, in particular the tensioning station with its tensioning technique. A tube chain conveyor can transport different types of bulk materials without substantial mixing of products or destruction of grains.

=== Adaptability ===
By using different plant components, the conveyor can be adapted arrangement to local conditions, i.e. one conveyor can be arranged at various operating levels. The configuration can be horizontal, vertical, circular, or a combination of these. It can convey material multi-dimensionally in a single move. Change in position can be effected horizontally and/or vertically by tube bends and/or deflection stations.

== See also ==
- Chain Pump
