= Slip sheet =

Unit load handling aid using sheet

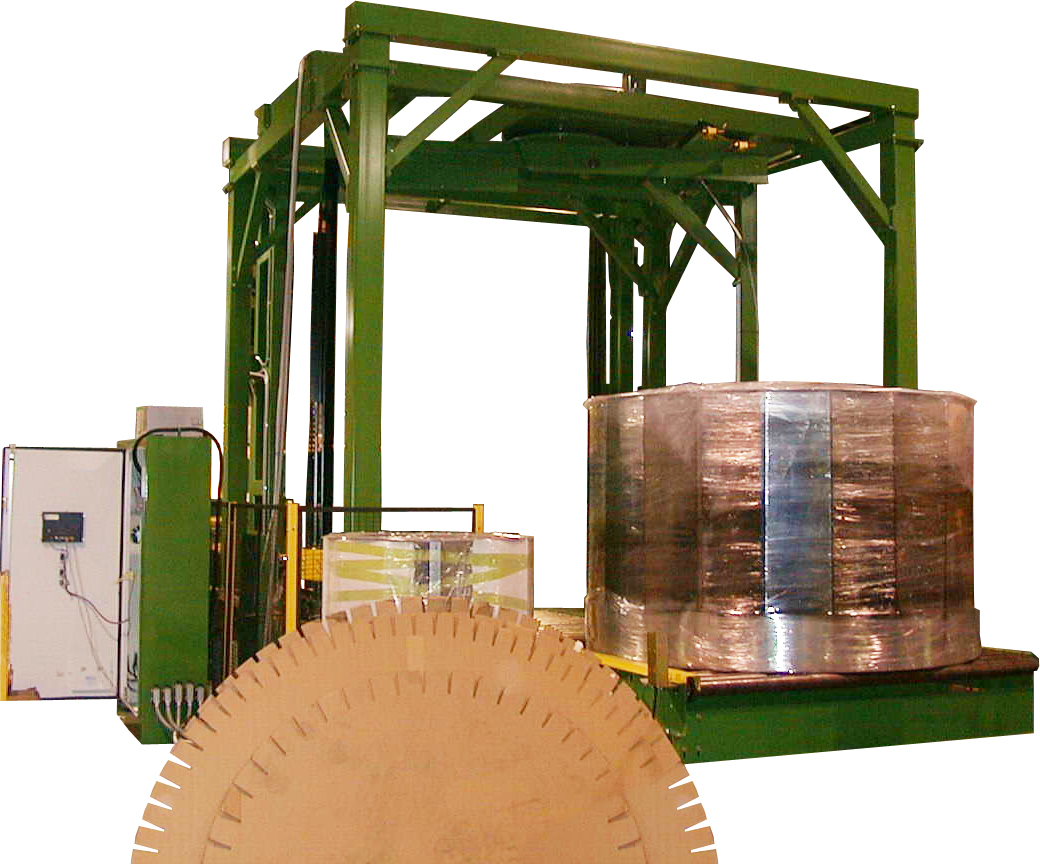
A load stretch wrapped with slip sheet on rotary arm stretch wrapper; slip sheets in foreground

A Slip sheet is “a corrugated, solid fiber, or plastic sheet onto which a unit load can be assembled. A protruding short panel can be grasped by the jaws of a pull-pack truck and the load pulled back onto the pull-pack platform.”

== Construction ==
Several constructions are available. replacing traditional wooden pallets. The unit load is usually stretch wrapped or shrink wrapped for stability.

Many are constructed of corrugated fiberboard or a thick solid fiber sheet. They are typically the size of a pallet or of the load to go on a pallet. One or more sides has a lip which extends from the load to allow grasping by a special push-pull attachment on a modified fork truck.

Plastic slip sheets can be made of corrugated plastic or a molded shape. Sometimes, the lip on the slipsheet can extend on all sides resembling a tray or shallow basket. These slip sheets are well suited to a returnable and reusable closed-loop system.

== Use ==
A common usage would be for the slip sheet to be placed on a pallet and loaded with boxes or bags. This loaded pallet might be going to a warehouse for storage: most slip sheets are not rigid enough to support loads in warehouse racks. When needed, the load can be called to the loading dock where a special fork lift truck will grab the lip of the slip sheet and pull it onto a flat steel platform. Some roller platforms are also available.

The slip sheet and load are then loaded onto a truck, rail car, of intermodal container and placed on the floor. This reduces the volume and weight of the pallet for shipment. At the end of the shipment, similar fork trucks with puch-pull attachments grab the loads and place them on pallets for further storage, distribution, or use,

== Comparison with pallets ==
Each system has some advantages. A thorough analysis is useful to determine all cost factors for a particular situation. The primary advantages of a slip sheet system, is the reduction in material cost compared with a pallet and the ability to increase the density of packages per truck or shipping container. The disadvantages might include the need for special handling equipment at both ends of the shipment.

== See also ==
- Packaging and labeling
- Pallet inverter
