= Mechanical brake stretch wrapper =

Manual package wrapping system

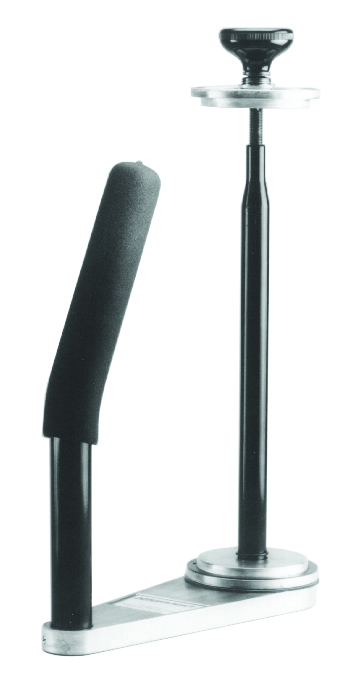
A mechanical brake stretch wrapper.

Mechanical brake stretch wrappers are manual stretch wrapping systems which consist of a simple structure supporting a roll of film to be stretched and a mechanical brake which acts on the film roll, creating resistance to turning and stretching the film as it is fed out.

The amount of braking is often variable by means of either a knob or a lever system. The support structure is most commonly a base paired with a handle, but recently pole wrappers have been introduced providing a more ergonomic design.
