= Chain conveyor =

Type of conveyor system for production lines

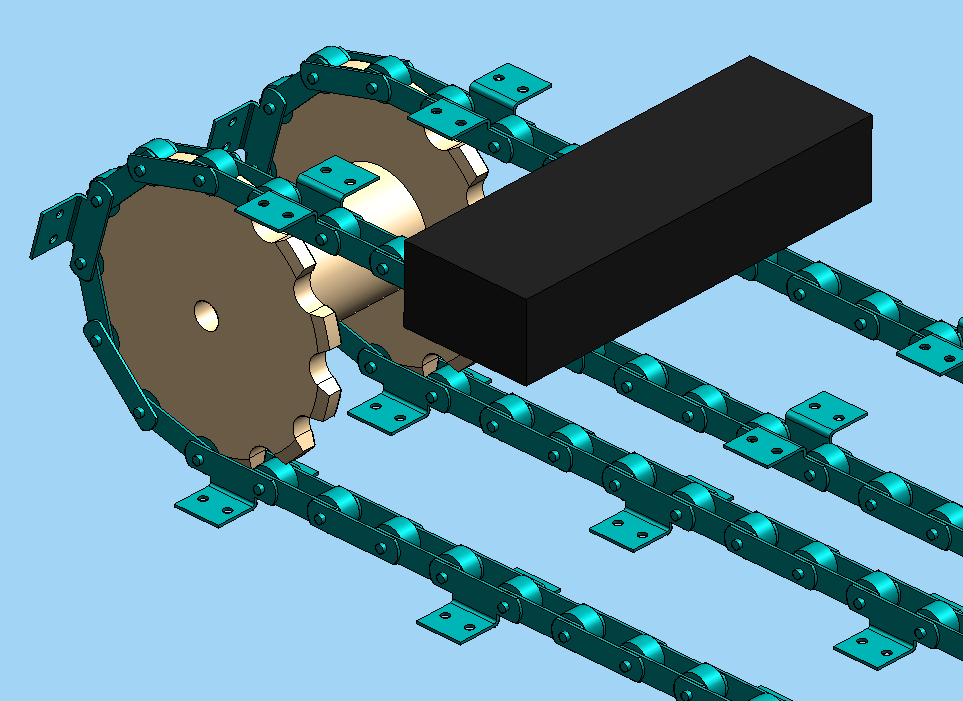
Diagram of a chain and sprockets in a conveyor system

A chain conveyor is a type of conveyor system for moving material through production lines.

== Operation ==
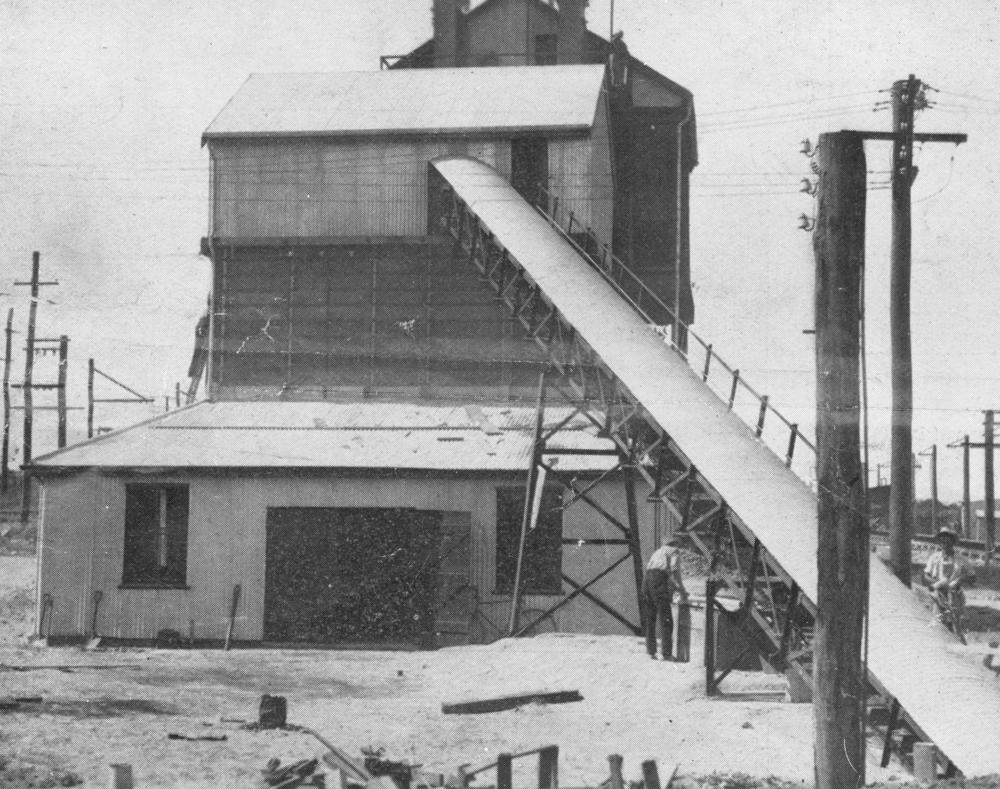
Covered scraper-chain conveyor at the Bowen State Coke Works, Queensland, 1933

Chain conveyors use an endless chain both to transmit power and to propel material through a trough, either pushed directly by the chain or by attachments to the chain. The chain runs over sprockets at either end of the trough. Chain conveyors are used to move material up to 90 metres (300 ft), and typically under 30 metres (98 ft).

Chain conveyors utilize a powered continuous chain arrangement, carrying a series of single pendants. The chain arrangement is driven by a motor, and the material suspended on the pendants is conveyed. Chain conveyors are used for moving products down an assembly line and/or around a manufacturing or warehousing facility.

Chain conveyors are primarily used to transport heavy unit loads, e.g., pallets, grid boxes, and industrial containers. These conveyors can be single or double chain strand in configuration. The load is positioned on the chains, and the friction pulls the load forward. Chain conveyors are generally easy to install and have minimal maintenance for users.

Many industry sectors use chain conveyor technology in their production lines. The automotive industry commonly uses chain conveyor systems to convey car parts through paint plants. Chain conveyors also have widespread use in the white and brown goods, metal finishing and distribution industries. Chain conveyors are also used in the painting and coating industry, which allows for easier paint application. The products are attached to an overhead chain conveyor, keeping products off of the floor allows for higher productivity levels.

== Types ==
Types of chain conveyor include apron, drag, plain chain, scraper, flight, and en-masse conveyors.

=== Drag conveyor ===
Drag conveyors, variously called drag chain conveyors, scraper chain conveyors and en-masse conveyors, are used in bulk material handling to move solid material along a trough. They are used for moving materials such as cement clinker, ash, and sawdust in the mining and chemical industries, municipal solid waste incinerators, and the production of pellet fuel.

The difference between drag conveyors, scraper conveyors, and flight conveyors largely depends on whether the chain links have obvious flights or paddles attached. In a drag conveyor, the chain moves the material directly, while a flight conveyor uses a series of wood, metal, or plastic flights attached to the chain at regular intervals, which push the material along the trough.

=== Multiflexing chain conveyor ===
Vertical chain conveyor in the pharmaceutical industry

Multiflexing conveyor systems use plastic chains in many configurations. The flexible conveyor chain design permits horizontal as well as vertical change of direction.

== See also ==
- Conveyor system
- Conveyor belt
- Lineshaft roller conveyor
