= Tubular Gallery =

A Tubular Gallery is a large diameter, round, tubular steel structure used to enclose a troughed conveyor belt. It is typically an elevated structure used to span over roadways, rivers or creeks or for use in shiploader systems.

== Applications ==
Tubular Gallery conveyors are used when a product needs to be isolated from its surrounding environment during transport. Power, cement, petroleum by-product, bio-fuel, coal, agricultural and ship loading are a few of the industries and applications that commonly use Tubular Gallery conveyors.

A cost-effective alternative to the Tubular Gallery System is a totally enclosed air supported belt conveyor.

== Comparison to covered truss conveyors ==
The Tubular Gallery is distinct from covered truss conveyors. Tubular Galleries consist of a completed assembly (which may include the conveyor, air and water piping, lights, and venting) which is assembled in the shop and shipped in completed sections. As a result, it takes much less time and labor to erect in the field and is more durable than covered truss conveyors.

== Specifications ==
Common sizes are 8’-12’ diameter, with clear spans over 100’. A variety of options exist for material type, paint and internal arrangements to complete the tubular gallery.
