= Moving-bed heat exchanger =

A moving-bed heat exchanger (MBHE) is a heat exchanger that transfers heat between a fluid and a solid granular material using continuous downward flow (often gravity-driven) past a surface (tube, plate, funnel, et cetera). They are widely used in industry, on applications involving heat recovery (providing a high volumetric transfer area) and filtering (avoiding common operational problems in fixed bed or ceramic filters like the pressure drop increase during operation). Example use-cases include high-temperature industrial processes like waste heat recovery, biomass gasification, and concentrated solar power. The name "bed" refers to the layer of solid particles that flows in order to be heated or cooled.

== Construction ==
The moving-bed heat exchanger is a gravity driven indirect heat exchanger using fine-grained bulk material. Media moves along heat transfer surfaces which can be tubes, plates or panels. Moving-bed heat exchangers offer the advantages of little external equipment, a compact design, low maintenance cost and low construction costs.

The moving-bed heat exchanger can consist of several heat exchanger modules arranged one above the other. The product leaves the heat exchanger via the discharge bottom and a funnel. The funnel can be equipped with a collecting screw conveyor if necessary. This does not affect the moving bed. A roof-shaped protecting screen can be installed above the heat exchanger modules to keep out agglomerates and impurities that cannot pass safely through the tube packages. Baffle plates can be installed to prevent wear of the protective screen. At the water/steam side, the ends of the heat exchanger packages (ends of the cooling water tubes) are fitted with reversing chambers and sealed with removable end plates.

On the product side, the outer tubes of the heat exchanger packages are equipped with steel plate strips at the sides. Their patented design keeps the product inside the heat exchanger - without the side walls obstructing access to the inside or interfering with the product movement. In addition, doors can be fitted (to protect the environment and the product quality).

== Applications ==
Moving-bed heat exchangers can be used for cooling or warming of all free-flowing bulk materials which correspond to the requirements of the apparatus, concerning grain size and angle of repose. The heat exchangers often can be found after rotary kilns and dryers to cool e.g. mineral (quartz sand, Ilmentit, etc.) or chemical products (fertilizer, soda, etc.). The entry temperatures of the products can reach up to 1200 °C.

Thermal energy storage (TES) systems utilizing low cost sand have been proposed.

A study was conducted on the use of a moving-bed heat exchanger filter (MHEF) for removing fine dust particles from gases. The influence of a number of variables was examined, including gas velocities, solid velocities, gas temperatures and dust sizes. The collection efficiency was found to decrease with increasing temperature; the total collection efficiency decreases strongly when the solid velocity increases. A stable numerical model for filtration and heat exchange was developed that predicts the two-dimensional transient response of both solid and fluid phases. The numerical model incorporates variation in void fraction, velocities and transport coefficient due to combined processes of filtration and heat exchange.

== Technical considerations ==
Moving-bed heat exchangers have a relatively compact construction. Because of the working principle they need only a small base. However, depending on their application they can build relatively high. Because of having only few moved parts they have low electrical requirements and are low-maintenance. Problems with noise or dust contamination of the environments do not occur.

Particulate materials are a promising heat storage and heat transfer media for high temperature applications such as industrial processes, conventional power plants or concentrating solar power (CSP). The flow behavior of the bulk material not only influences the design of the heat exchanger, but also affects the thermal behavior, since the contact time at the walls strongly depends on particle flowability. Occurrence of attrition leads to a deteriorated flow pattern, because the mean grain size and bulk porosity decrease as grain size distribution widens. This has a significant impact on design considerations.

== See also ==
- Conveyor system, common piece of mechanical handling equipment that moves materials from one location to another
- Heat exchanger, system used to transfer heat between a source and a working fluid
