= Turntable stretch wrapper =

Type of automatic and semi-automatic stretch wrapping system

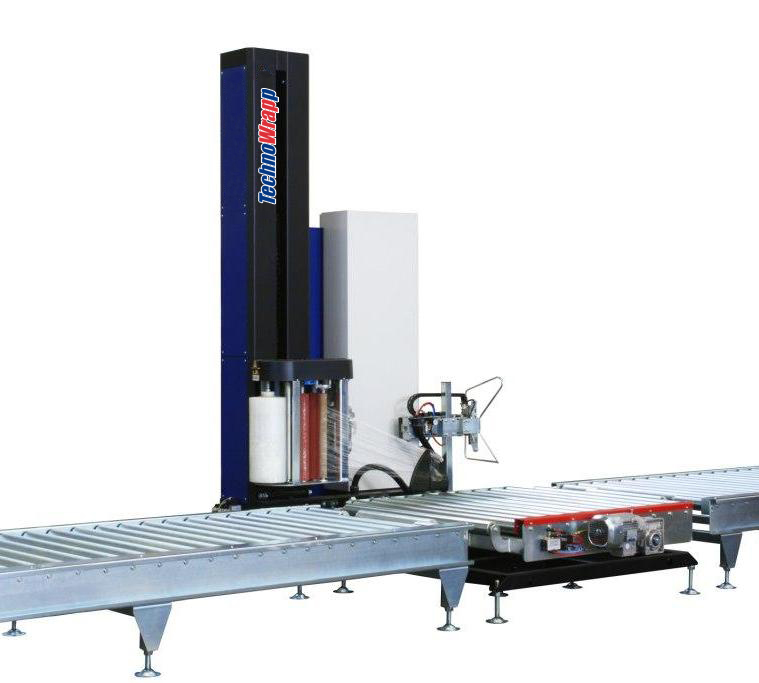
An automatic turntable stretch wrapper with a pre-stretch system

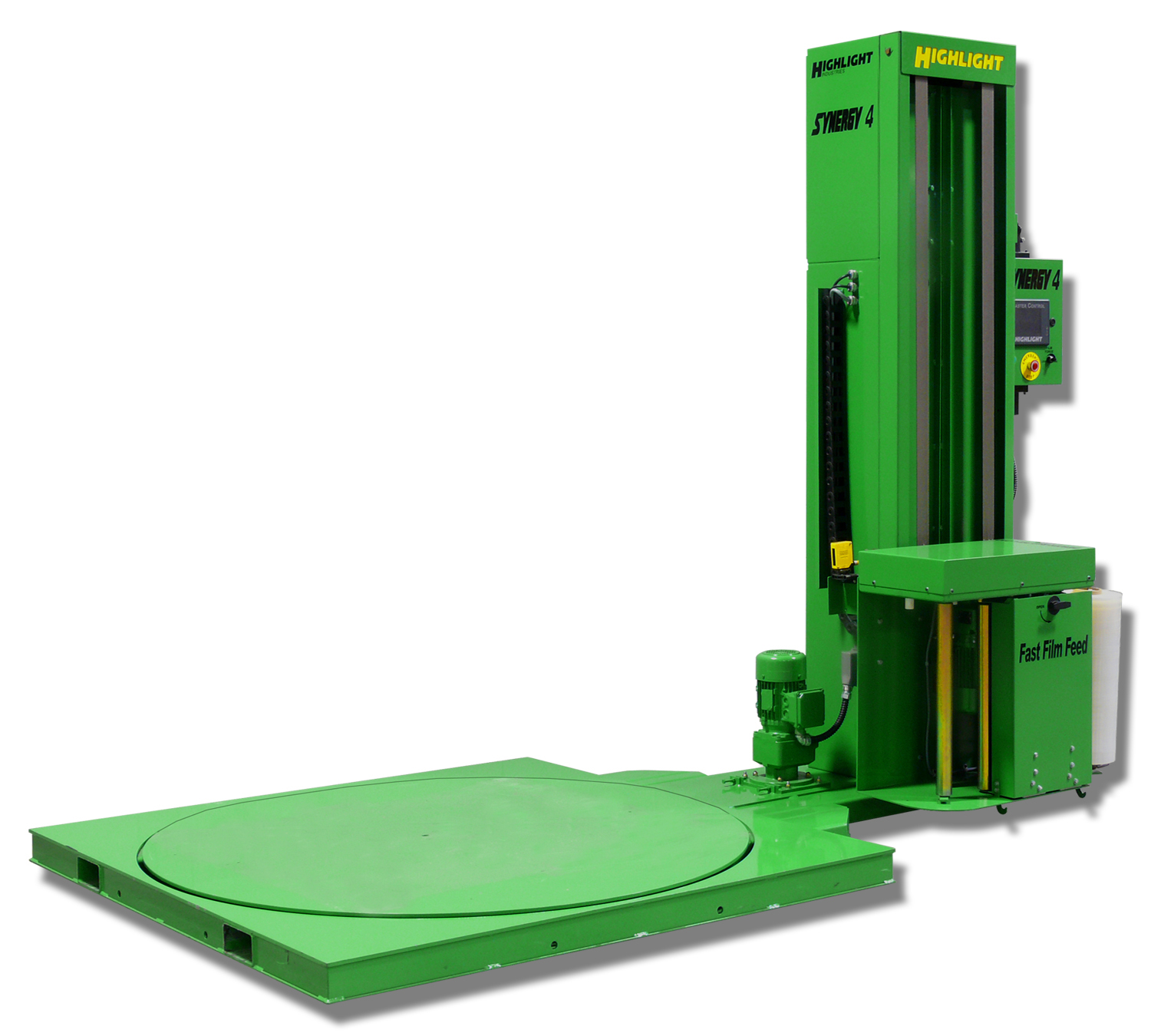
A semi-automatic turntable stretch wrapper.

Turntable stretch wrappers are a type of automatic and semi-automatic stretch wrapping system. A load is placed on a turntable, which rotates relative to the film roll, which is housed in a carriage attached to a vertical "mast" on which it may move up and down.

== Information ==
In the simplest turntable systems, stretch is achieved by rotating the load at a speed in which the take-up demand on the load surface is faster than the rate at which the film is allowed to be fed, being limited by a brake system.

More sophisticated systems also pre-stretch the film before wrapping by means of fixed/variable gear ratios or other, even more sophisticated means, such as hydraulic ratios which can better take advantage of film "sweet spots", improving performance and film savings.
