= Electric track vehicle system =

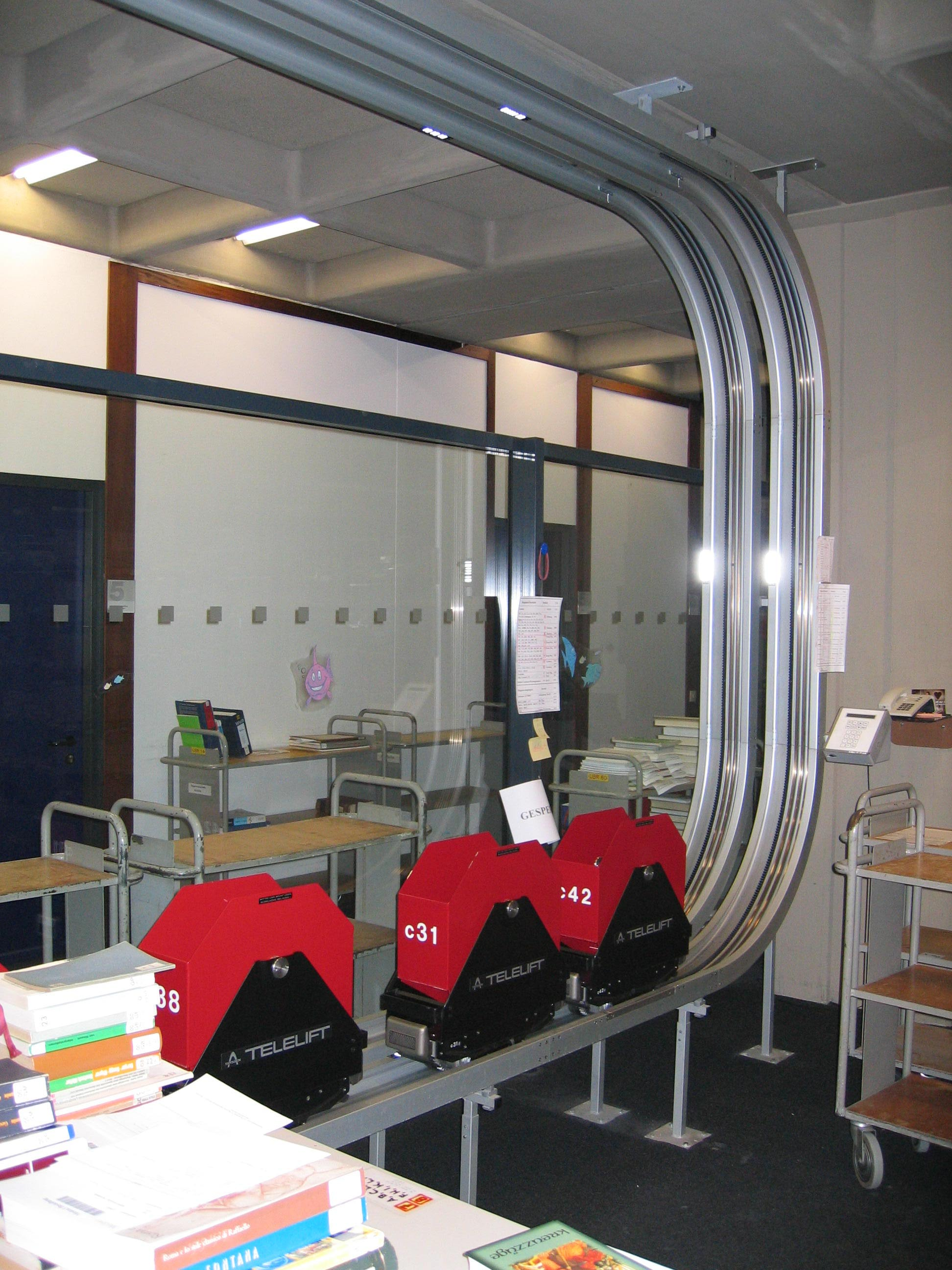
Telelift GmbH ETV system at University library Regensburg, Germany

An electric track vehicle system (ETV) is a conveyor system for light goods transport. The system uses independently driven vehicles traveling on a monorail track network, consisting of straight track elements, bends, curves and transfer-units for changing of travel direction. Vehicles in an ETV system transport payloads up to 50 kg both vertical and horizontal in buildings and manufacturing plants. ETV systems were primarily put on the market in the 1960s by German company Telelift GmbH. Later additional companies like Siemens or Thyssen engaged in this business.

== Application ==
Initially, electric track vehicle systems were designed for documents transport and mail distribution in office buildings and headquarters. Later, further applications were designed for hospitals, libraries, printing plants, retail stores and material handling in manufacturing plants.

Mainly transported goods are:

- Hospital: blood plasma, lab samples, pharmaceuticals, sterile utilities, patient records, x-rays and hospital consumables
- Library: books, newspapers, journals, media
- Headquarters, ministries, office buildings: documents, mail, parcels
- Printing plants: printing plates
- Retail stores: garment, shoes, jewelry, luxury goods
- Manufacturing plants: component parts, assemblies, tools

Electric track vehicle systems operate horizontal and vertical in one and the same vehicle per transport job. Conveying without transfer allows gentle transport of sensitive goods. Vehicle destination is usually typed into a touchscreen terminal at the station. The vehicles operate with a speed up to 1 m/s.

The modular design of Electric Track Vehicle systems allows wide spreading track networks. E.g., the ETV system in the Bibliothèque nationale de France in Paris consists of 6.6 km tracks, 151 stations and 300 vehicles.
