= Stretch wrap =

Packaging material

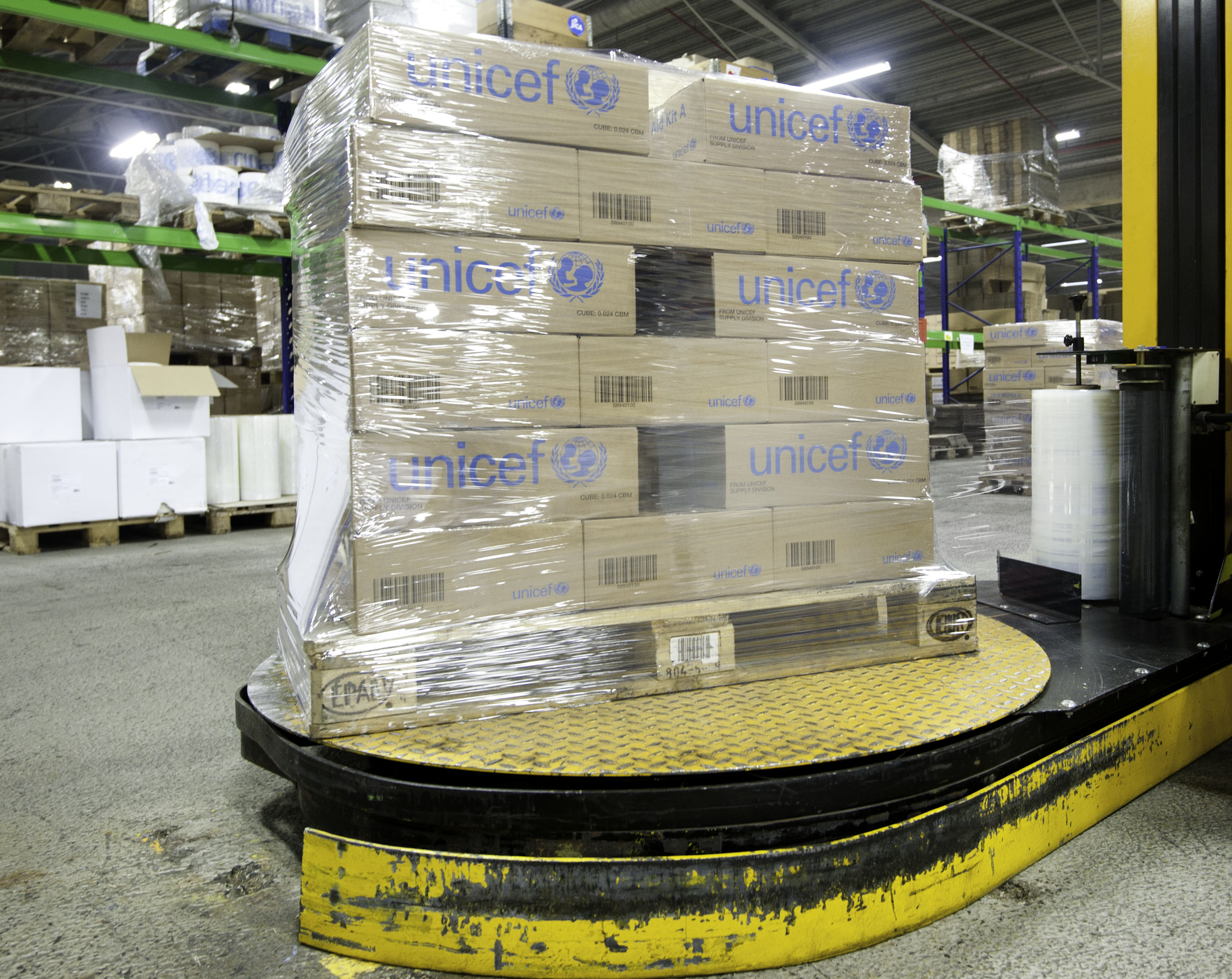
A pallet loaded with corrugated fiberboard boxes being stretch wrapped

Stretch wrap or stretch film, sometimes known as pallet wrap, is a highly stretchable plastic film that is wrapped around items. The elastic recovery keeps the items tightly bound. In contrast, shrink wrap is applied loosely around an item and shrinks tightly with heat. While it is similar to plastic food wrap, it is not usually made of material rated as safe for food contact.

It is frequently used to secure pallet loads to one another but also may be used for bundling smaller items. Types of stretch film include bundling stretch film, hand stretch film, extended core stretch film, machine stretch film and static dissipative film.

== Materials ==
The most common stretch wrap material is linear low-density polyethylene (LLDPE), which is produced by copolymerization of ethylene with alpha-olefins, the most common of which are butene, hexene and octene. The use of higher alpha-olefins (hexene or octene) gives rise to enhanced stretch film characteristics, particularly in respect of elongation at break and puncture resistance. Other types of polyethylene and PVC can also be used. Many films have about 500% stretch at break but are only stretched to about 100–300% in use. Once stretched, the elastic recovery is used to keep the load tight.

There are two methods of producing stretch wrap:

- Blown: the resin is melted and extruded through an annular die, it is air-cooled. This is a slower process but provides for higher cling quality. Blown film is not a consistent extrusion process, leading to inconsistencies across the film web. The cost of production is also higher due to the quantity that can be produced per hour.
- Cast: the film is extruded through a slot die, then passed over cooling rollers. This makes the cooling process quick. Cast films are more consistent and have better performance characteristics. The cling quality is not as good as blown but more can be produced in an hour with lower costs.

Other properties such as break strength, cling, clarity, tear resistance, static discharge, etc. are also important.

== Functions ==
In pallet unitizing, stretch wrap can have several functions:

- Improved stability of products or packages, forming a unit load
- More efficient handling and storage of unit loads
- Some degree of dust and moisture protection
- Some degree of tamper resistance and resistance to package pilferage
- Some degree of sun protection (UV stretch wraps)

Making sure boxes stay on the pallet and properly aligned is an important consideration in warehouse distribution, especially as the demands for increased throughput continues to rise.

== Stretch wrappers ==
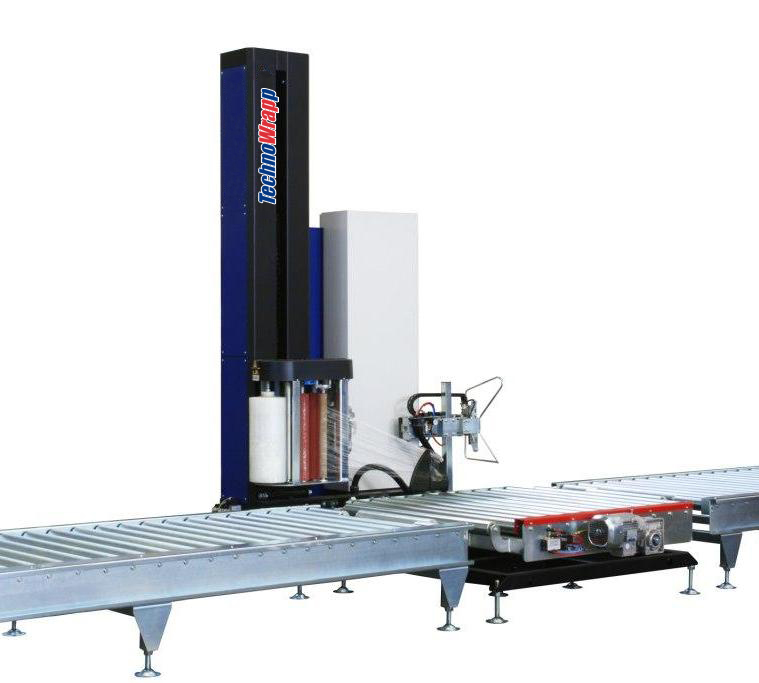
An automatic turntable wrapper

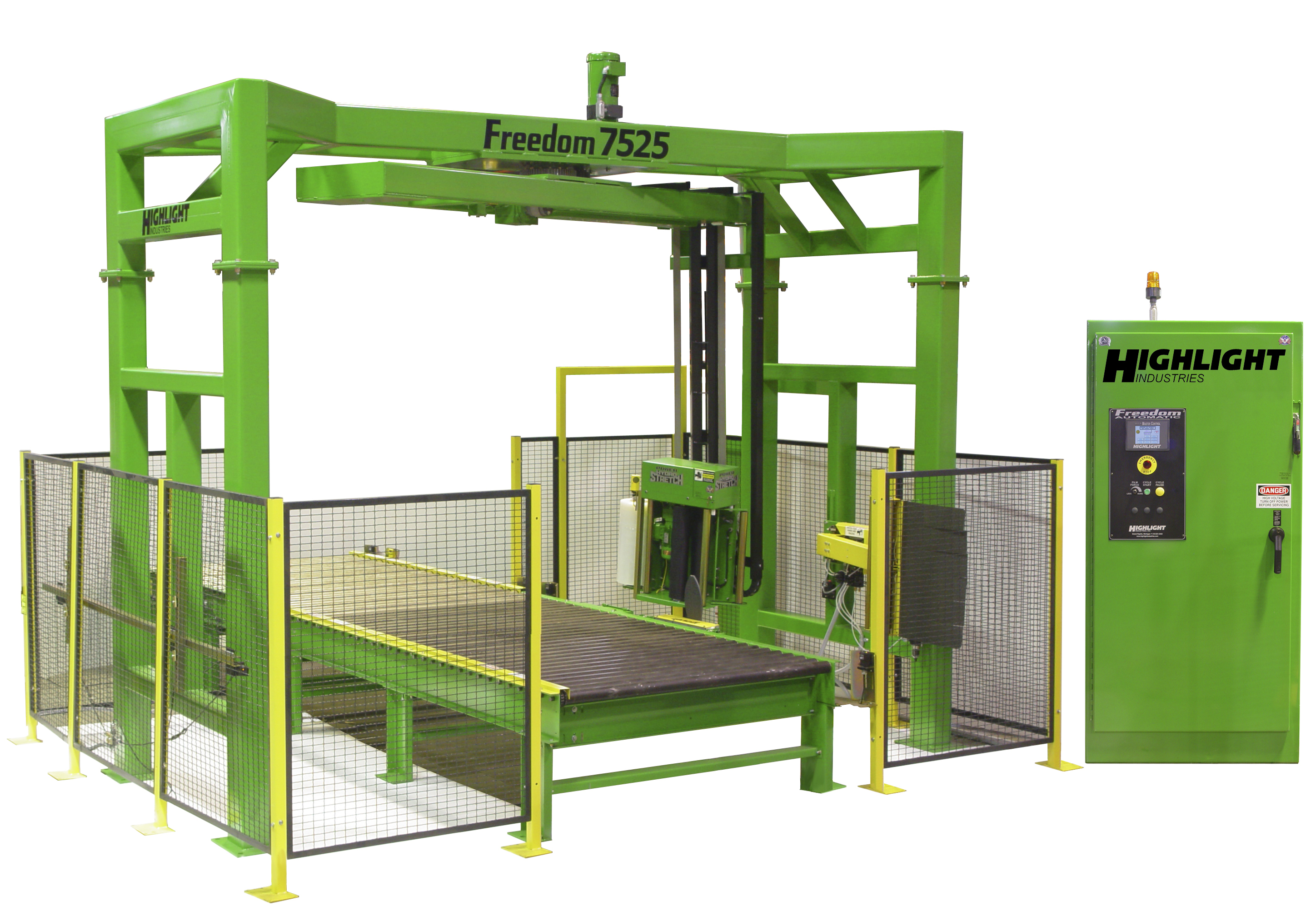
An automatic rotary arm wrapper

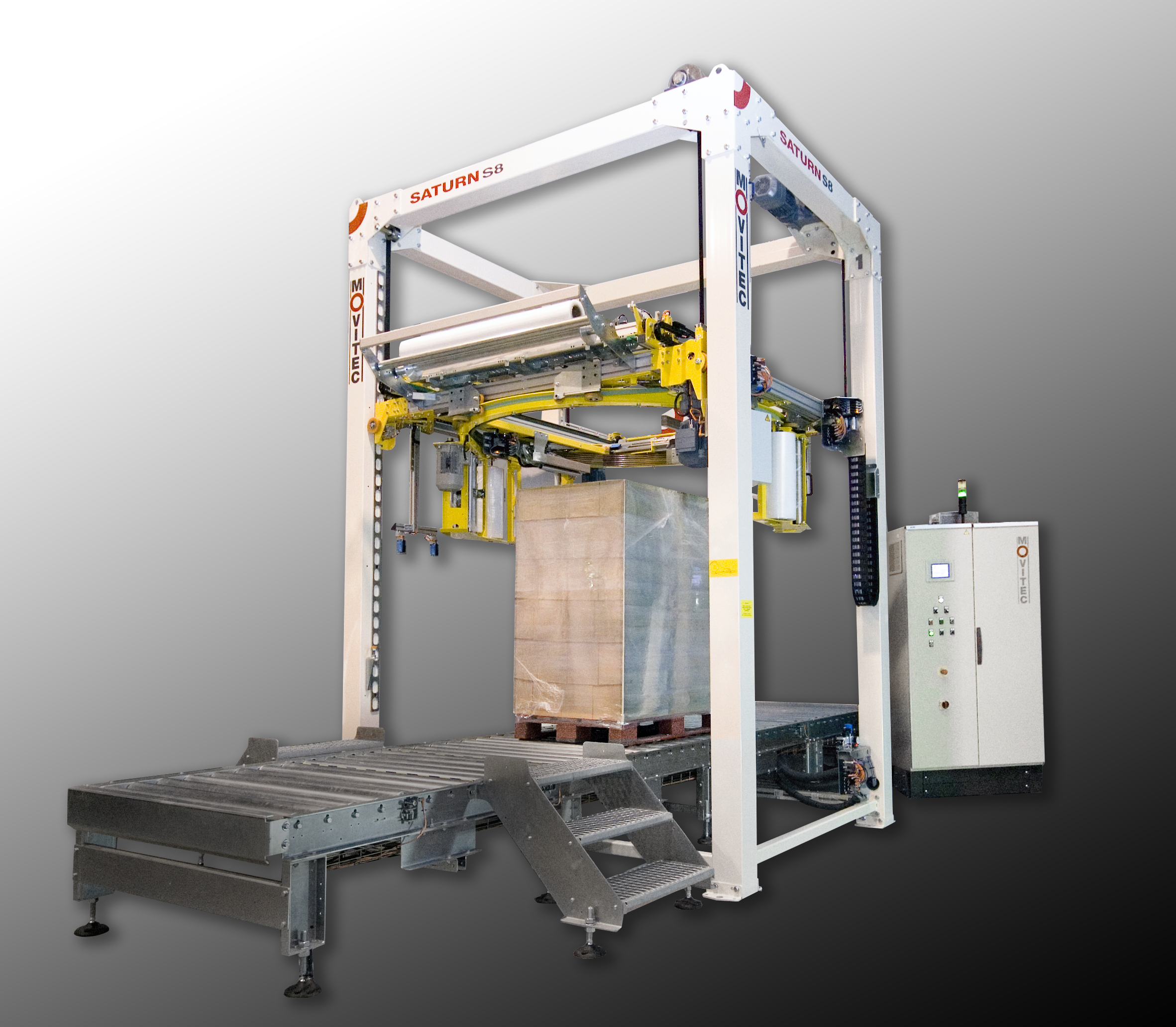
An automatic rotary ring wrapper

Stretch wrappers are devices used to apply stretch wrap. There are many types of stretch wrappers:

- Manual (or hand) wrappers:
  - Extended core: An extension of the film's core serves as a handle for wrapping; this type of wrapper offers little stretch control and is hard on hands.
  - Mechanical brake: A simple structure supports a film roll and a mechanical brake system provides resistance creating stretch of the film.
  - Pole wrappers: Similar to the mechanical brake system, but the roll and brake are at the end of an extended pole, creating an ergonomic design which eliminates the need to bend to wrap the bottoms of loads and strain to reach the tops of loads.
  - Prestretch hand wrappers. One-hand-operated wrapping tool with a mechanical pre stretch achieved by two guiding rollers for the stretch film with different speeds.
- Semi-automatic wrappers:
  - Turntable wrappers: The load to be wrapped sits on a turntable which spins the load relative to the film roll, which is housed in a carriage which can move up and down a fixed "mast". Stretch is achieved by rotating the load at a faster rate than the film is fed.
  - Orbital wrappers: The film is housed in a carriage on a vertical ring, the load is fed horizontally through the eye of the rotating ring, applying film to the load. A variation of an orbital stretch wrapper is a horizontal ring system, in which the load remains still while a horizontal ring is rotated around the load and moves up and down vertically relative to the load, similar to a rotary arm stretch wrapper.
  - Rotary arm wrappers: In this system, the load remains still while a rotating arm turns around it wrapping the load. This system is used for light loads or for speeds which would otherwise cause the load to topple due to high rotation speeds.
- Automatic wrappers: Automatic wrappers are generally a variant of a semi-automatic system. Automatic wrappers include a conveyor system to automatically load the wrapping machine and automatic systems to apply, seal, and cut the film.
  - Turntable wrappers: The load to be wrapped sits on a turntable which spins the load relative to the film roll, which is housed in a carriage which can move up and down a fixed "mast". Stretch is achieved by rotating the load at a faster rate than the film is fed.
  - Rotary arm wrappers: In this system, the load remains still while a rotating arm turns around it wrapping the load. This system is used for light loads or for speeds which would otherwise cause the load to topple due to high rotation speeds.
  - Rotary ring wrappers: The film is housed in a carriage on a horizontal ring in which the load remains static while the horizontal ring is rotating around the load and moves up and down vertically relative to the load, similar to a rotary arm stretch wrapper. The rotary ring technology is really a more balanced system with less wear and maintenance than the other available wrapping technologies. These wrappers are capable to reach the highest production capacities (up to 160 pallets per hour).

== See also ==
- Packaging and labeling
- Palletizer
- Paper pallet
- Plastic recycling
- Slip sheet
