= Conveyor system =

Equipment used for conveying materials

An overhead chain conveyor moves cars at Mercedes in Germany

A conveyor system is a common piece of mechanical handling equipment that moves materials from one location to another. Conveyors are especially useful in applications involving the transport of heavy or bulky materials. Conveyor systems allow quick and efficient transport for a wide variety of materials, which make them very popular in the material handling and packaging industries. They also have popular consumer applications, as they are often found in supermarkets and airports, constituting the final leg of item or bag delivery to customers. Many kinds of conveying systems are available and are used according to the various needs of different industries. There are chain conveyors (floor and overhead) as well. Chain conveyors consist of enclosed tracks, I-Beam, towline, power and free, and hand pushed trolleys.

== Industries where used ==
A lineshaft roller conveyor moves boxed produce at a distribution center.

A conveyor belt conveys papers at a newspaper print plant

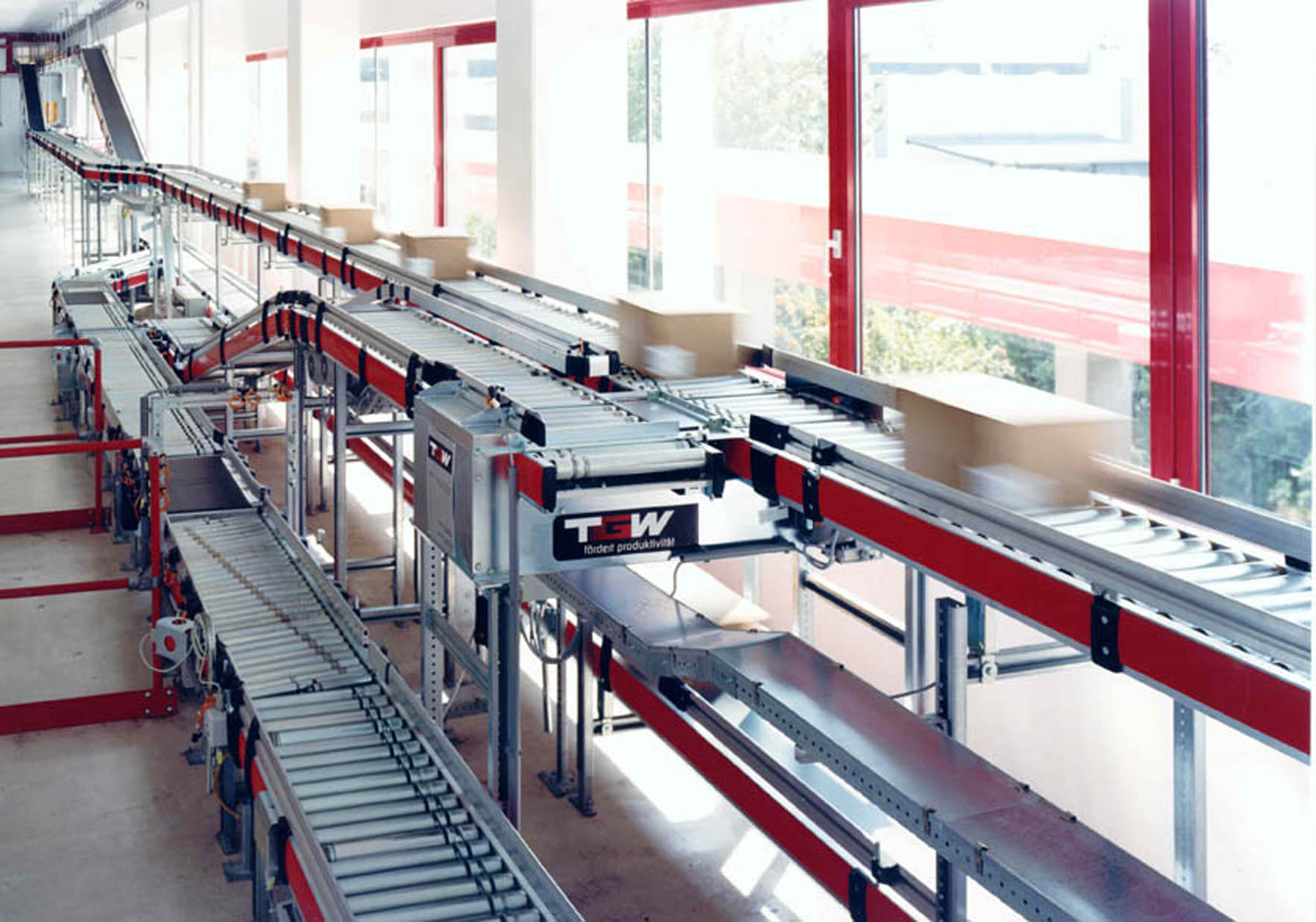
Roller conveyor for carton transport in the apparel industry

Conveyor systems are used widespread across a range of industries due to the numerous benefits they provide.

- Conveyors are able to safely transport materials from one level to another, which when done by human labor would be strenuous and expensive.
- They can be installed almost anywhere, and are much safer than using a forklift or other machine to move materials.
- They can move loads of all shapes, sizes and weights. Also, many have advanced safety features that help prevent accidents.
- There are a variety of options available for running conveying systems, including the hydraulic, mechanical and fully automated systems, which are equipped to fit individual needs.

Conveyor systems are commonly used in many industries, including the Mining, automotive, agricultural, computer, electronic, food processing, aerospace, pharmaceutical, chemical, bottling and canning, print finishing and packaging. Although a wide variety of materials can be conveyed, some of the most common include food items such as beans and nuts, bottles and cans, automotive components, scrap metal, pills and powders, wood and furniture and grain and animal feed. Many factors are important in the accurate selection of a conveyor system. It is important to know how the conveyor system will be used beforehand. Some individual areas that are helpful to consider are the required conveyor operations, such as transport, accumulation and sorting, the material sizes, weights and shapes and where the loading and pickup points need to be.

== Care and maintenance ==
A conveyor system is often the lifeline to a company's ability to effectively move its product in a timely fashion. The steps that a company can take to ensure that it performs at peak capacity, include regular inspections and system audits, close monitoring of motors and reducers, keeping key parts in stock, and proper training of personnel.

Increasing the service life of a conveyor system involves: choosing the right conveyor type, the right system design and paying attention to regular maintenance practices.

A conveyor system that is designed properly will last a long time with proper maintenance. Overhead conveyor systems have been used in numerous applications from shop displays, assembly lines to paint finishing plants and more.

== Impact- and wear-resistant materials ==
Conveyor systems require materials suited to the displacement of heavy loads and the wear-resistance to hold-up over time without seizing due to deformation. Where static control is a factor, special materials designed to either dissipate or conduct electrical charges are used. Examples of conveyor handling materials include UHMW, nylon, Nylatron NSM, HDPE, Tivar, Tivar ESd, and polyurethane.

== Growth in various industries ==
As far as growth is concerned the material handling and conveyor system makers are getting utmost exposure in the industries like automotive, pharmaceutical, packaging and different production plants. The portable conveyors are likewise growing fast in the construction sector and by the year 2014 the purchase rate for conveyor systems in North America, Europe and Asia is likely to grow even further. The most commonly purchased types of conveyors are line-shaft roller conveyors, chain conveyors and conveyor belts at packaging factories and industrial plants where usually product finishing and monitoring are carried. Commercial and civil sectors are increasingly implementing conveyors at airports, shopping malls, etc.

== Types ==
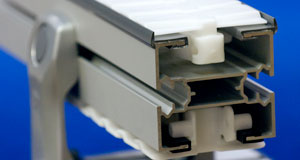
Flexible conveyor

- Aero-mechanical
- Automotive
- Belt
- Belt-driven live roller
- Bucket
- Chain
- Chain-driven live roller
- Chain-on-edge
- Drag
- Dust-proof
- Electric track vehicle system
- Flexible
- Gravity
- Gravity skate-wheel
- Lineshaft roller
- Motorized-drive roller
- Overhead I-beam
- Overland
- Pharmaceutical
- Plastic belt
- Pneumatic
- Screw or auger
- Spiral
- Tube chain
- Tubular gallery
- Vacuum
- Vertical
- Vibrating
- Walking beam
- Wire mesh

=== Flexible ===
The flexible conveyor is based on a conveyor beam in aluminum or stainless steel, with low-friction slide rails guiding a plastic multi-flexing chain. Products to be conveyed travel directly on the conveyor, or on pallets/carriers. These conveyors can be worked around obstacles and keep production lines flowing. They are made at varying levels and can work in multiple environments. They are used in food packaging, case packing, and pharmaceutical industries and also in large retail stores such as Wal-Mart and Kmart.

=== Pneumatic ===
Every pneumatic system uses pipes or ducts called transport lines that carry a mixture of materials and a stream of air. These materials are free flowing powdery materials like cement and fly ash. Products are moved through tubes by air pressure. Pneumatic conveyors are either carrier systems or dilute-phase systems; carrier systems simply push items from one entry point to one exit point, such as the money-exchanging pneumatic tubes used at a bank drive-through window. Dilute-phase systems use push-pull pressure to guide materials through various entry and exit points. Air compressors or blowers can be used to generate the air flow. Three systems used to generate high-velocity air stream:

1. Suction or vacuum systems, utilizing a vacuum created in the pipeline to draw the material with the surrounding air. The system operated at a low pressure, which is practically 0.4–0.5 atm below atmosphere, and is utilized mainly in conveying light free flowing materials.
2. Pressure-type systems, in which a positive pressure is used to push material from one point to the next. The system is ideal for conveying material from one loading point to a number of unloading points. It operates at a pressure of 6 atm and upwards.
3. Combination systems, in which a suction system is used to convey material from a number of loading points and a pressure system is employed to deliver it to a number of unloading points.

=== Roller ===
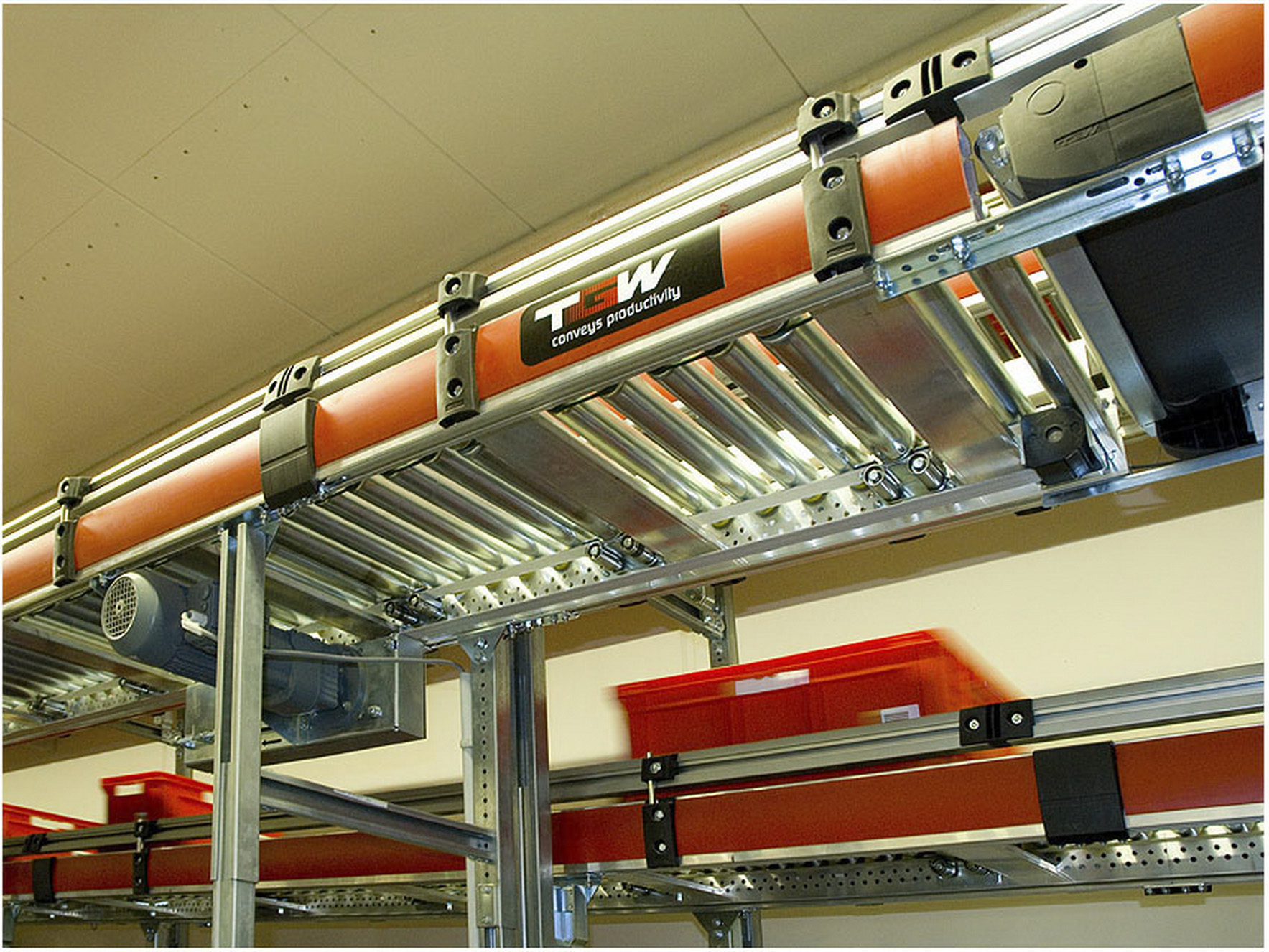
Belt driven roller conveyor for cartons and totes.

==== Heavy-duty ====
Heavy-duty roller conveyors are used for moving items that weigh at least 500 pounds (230 kg). This type of conveyor makes the handling of such heavy equipment/products easier and more time effective. Many of the heavy duty roller conveyors can move as fast as 75 feet per minute (23 m/min).

Other types of heavy-duty roller conveyors are gravity roller conveyors, chain-driven live roller conveyors, pallet accumulation conveyors, multi-strand chain conveyors, and chain and roller transfers.

Gravity roller conveyors are easy to use and are used in many different types of industries such as automotive and retail.

Chain-driven live roller conveyors are used for single or bi-directional material handling. Large, heavy loads are moved by chain driven live roller conveyors.

Pallet accumulation conveyors are powered through a mechanical clutch. This is used instead of individually powered and controlled sections of conveyors.

Multi-strand chain conveyors are used for double-pitch roller chains. Products that cannot be moved on traditional roller conveyors can be moved by a multi-strand chain conveyor.

Chain and roller conveyors are short runs of two or more strands of double-pitch chain conveyors built into a chain-driven line roller conveyor. These pop up under the load and move the load off of the conveyor.

=== Motorized drive (MDR) ===
Motorized drive roller (MDR) conveyors utilize drive rollers that have a brushless DC (BLDC) motor embedded within a conveyor roller tube. A single motorized roller tube is then mechanically linked to a small number of non-powered rollers to create a controllable zone of powered conveyor. A linear collection of these individually powered zones are arranged end to end to form a line of contiguous conveyor. The mechanical performance (torque, speed, efficiency, etc.) of drive rollers equipped with BLDC motors is right in the range of that needed for roller conveyor zones when they need to convey general use carton boxes of the size and weight seen in typical modern warehouse and distribution applications. A typical motorized roller conveyor zone can handle carton items weighing up to approximately 35 kg (75 lbs.).

=== Spiral ===
Like vertical conveyors, spiral conveyors raise and lower materials to different levels of a facility. In contrast, spiral conveyors are able to transport material loads in a continuous flow. A helical spiral or screw rotates within a sealed tube and the speed makes the product in the conveyor rotate with the screw. The tumbling effect provides a homogeneous mix of particles in the conveyor, which is essential when feeding pre-mixed ingredients and maintaining mixing integrity. Industries that require a higher output of materials - food and beverage, retail case packaging, pharmaceuticals - typically incorporate these conveyors into their systems over standard vertical conveyors due to their ability to facilitate high throughput. Most spiral conveyors also have a lower angle of incline or decline (11 degrees or less) to prevent sliding and tumbling during operation.

=== Vertical ===
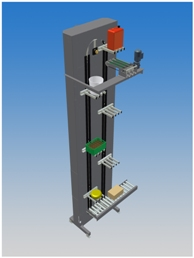
Vertical conveyor with forks

Vertical conveyors, also commonly referred to as freight lifts and material lifts, are conveyor systems used to raise or lower materials to different levels of a facility during the handling process. Examples of these conveyors applied in the industrial assembly process include transporting materials to different floors. While similar in look to freight elevators, vertical conveyors are not equipped to transport people, only materials.

Vertical lift conveyors contain two adjacent, parallel conveyors for simultaneous upward movement of adjacent surfaces of the parallel conveyors. One of the conveyors normally has spaced apart flights (pans) for transporting bulk food items. The dual conveyors rotate in opposite directions, but are operated from one gear box to ensure equal belt speed. One of the conveyors is pivotally hinged to the other conveyor for swinging the attached conveyor away from the remaining conveyor for access to the facing surfaces of the parallel conveyors. Vertical lift conveyors can be manually or automatically loaded and controlled. Almost all vertical conveyors can be systematically integrated with horizontal conveyors, since both of these conveyor systems work in tandem to create a cohesive material handling assembly line.

Like spiral conveyors, vertical conveyors that use forks can transport material loads in a continuous flow. With these forks the load can be taken from one horizontal conveyor and put down on another horizontal conveyor on a different level. By adding more forks, more products can be lifted at the same time. Conventional vertical conveyors must have input and output of material loads moving in the same direction. By using forks many combinations of different input- and output- levels in different directions are possible. A vertical conveyor with forks can even be used as a vertical sorter. Compared to a spiral conveyor a vertical conveyor - with or without forks - takes up less space.

Vertical reciprocating conveyors (or VRC) are another type of unit handling system. Typical applications include moving unit loads between floor levels, working with multiple accumulation conveyors, and interfacing overhead conveyors line. Common material to be conveyed includes pallets, sacks, custom fixtures or product racks and more.

=== Vibrating ===
A vibrating conveyor is a machine with a solid conveying surface which is turned up on the side to form a trough. They are used extensively in food-grade applications to convey dry bulk solids where sanitation, washdown, and low maintenance are essential. Vibrating conveyors are also suitable for harsh, very hot, dirty, or corrosive environments. They can be used to convey newly-cast metal parts which may reach upwards of 1,500 °F (820 °C). Due to the fixed nature of the conveying pans vibrating conveyors can also perform tasks such as sorting, screening, classifying and orienting parts. Vibrating conveyors have been built to convey material at angles exceeding 45° from horizontal using special pan shapes. Flat pans will convey most materials at a 5° incline from horizontal line.

=== Walking beam ===
It usually consists of two fluid power cylinders or also can use a motor driven cam. For the cylinder driven fluid power type, one axis is for vertical motion and the other for horizontal. Both cam and fluid power types require nests at each station to retain the part that is being moved. The beam is raised, raising the part from its station nest and holding the part in a nest on the walking beam, then moved horizontally, transporting the part to the next nest, then lowered vertically, placing the part in the next station's nest. The beam is then returned to its home position while it is in the lowered position out of the way of the parts. This type of conveying system is useful for parts that need to be accurately physically located or relatively heavy parts. All stations are equidistant and require a nest to retain the part.

== See also ==
- Belt conveyor
- Chain conveyor
- Checkweigher
- Manufacturing
- Material handling
- Moving bed heat exchanger
- Moving walkway
- Treadmill
