= Town =

Type of human settlement

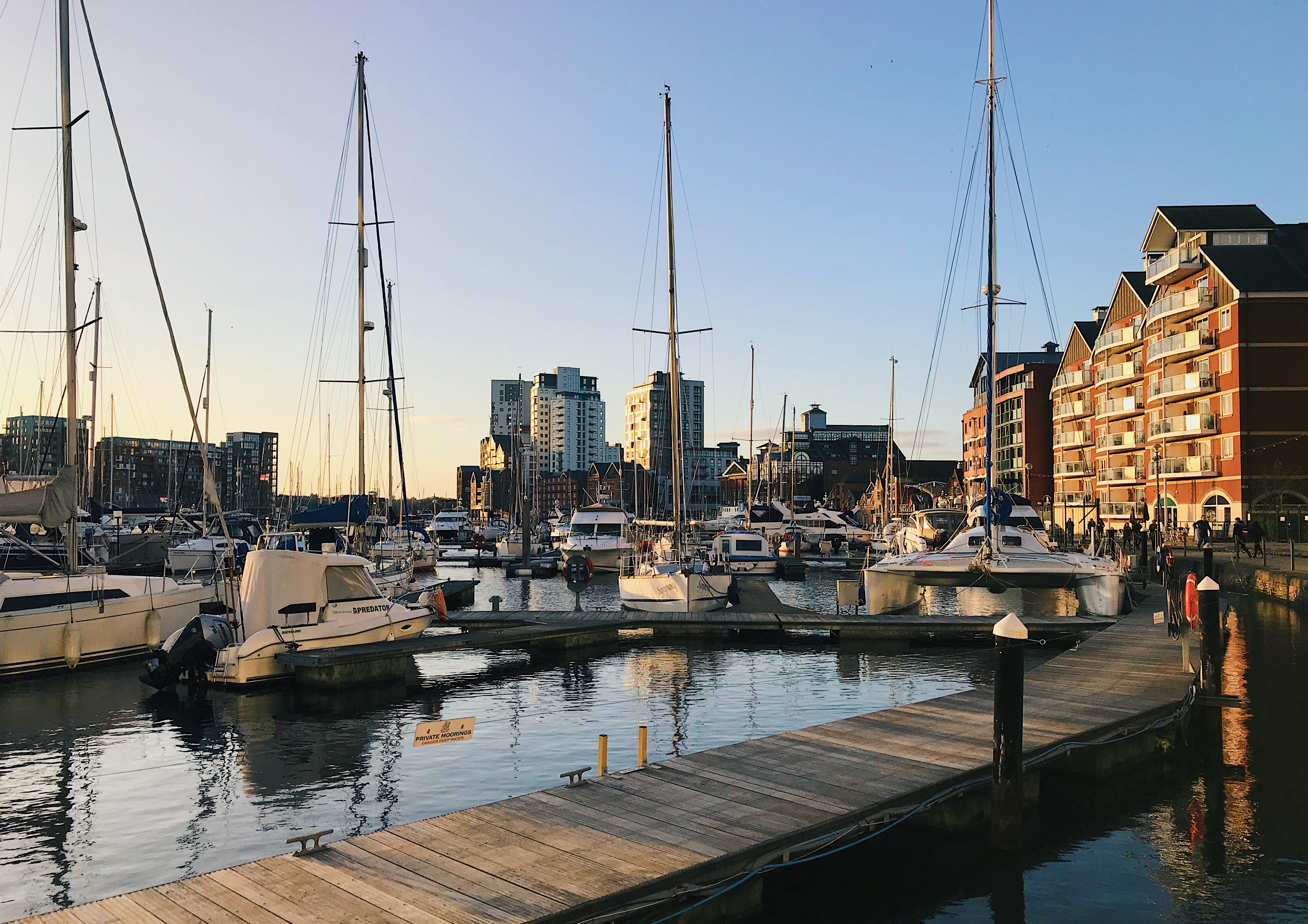
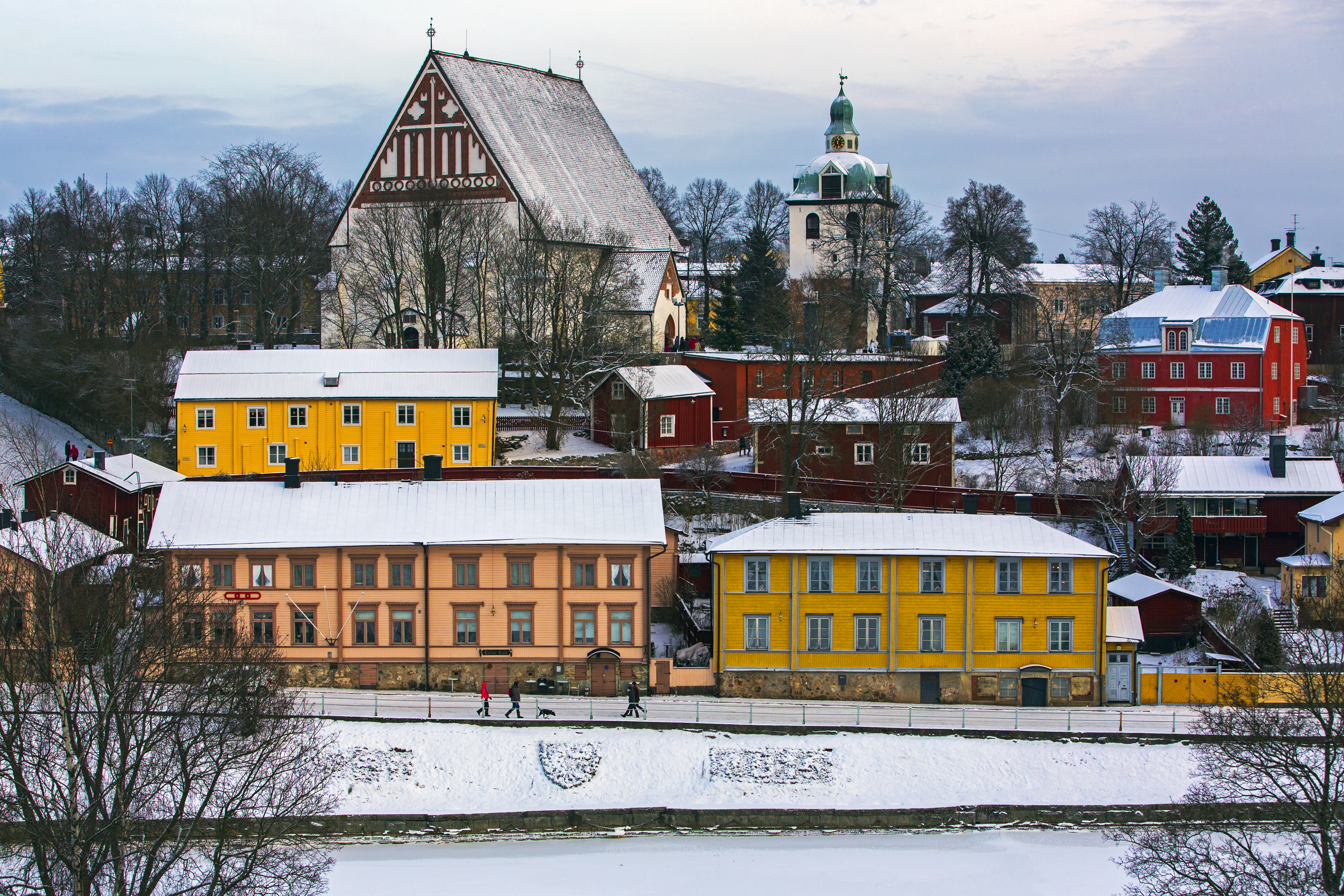
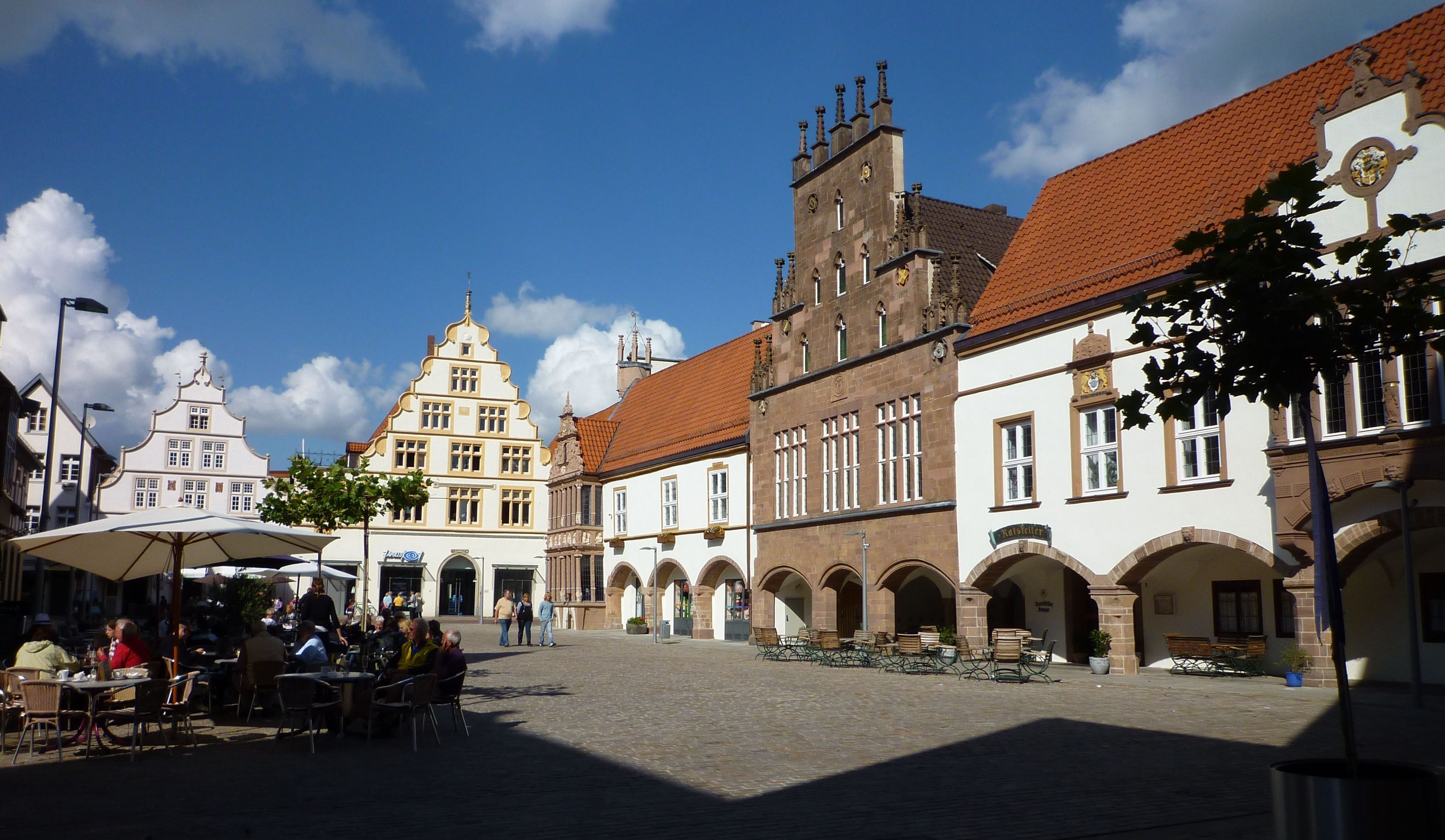
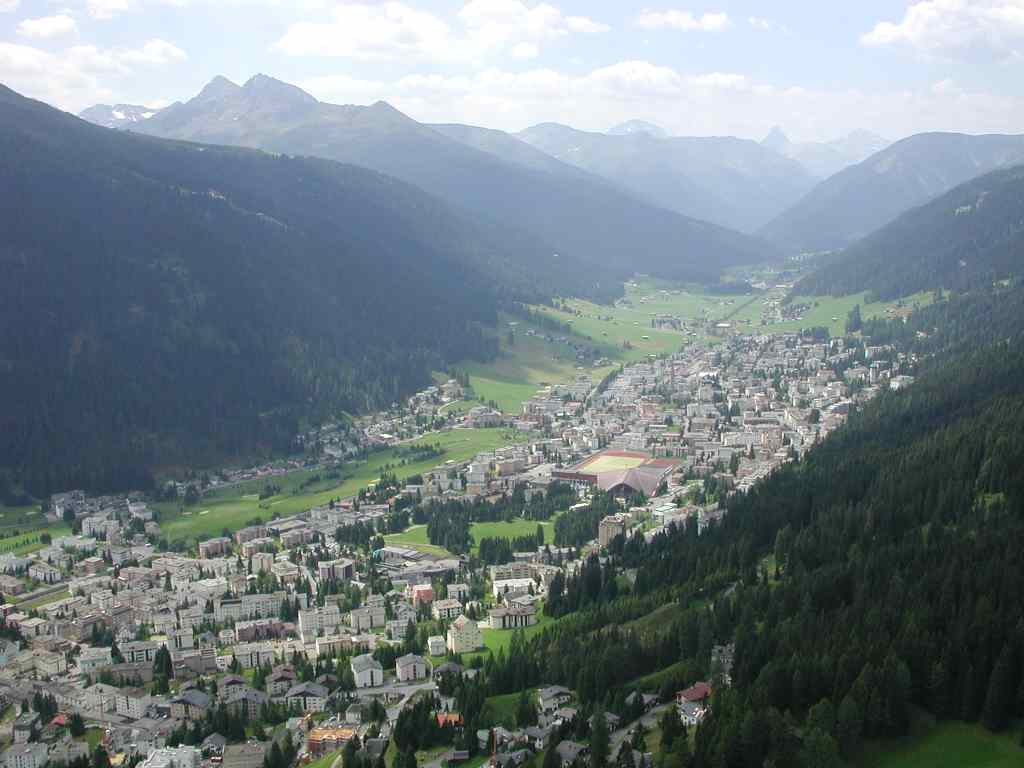
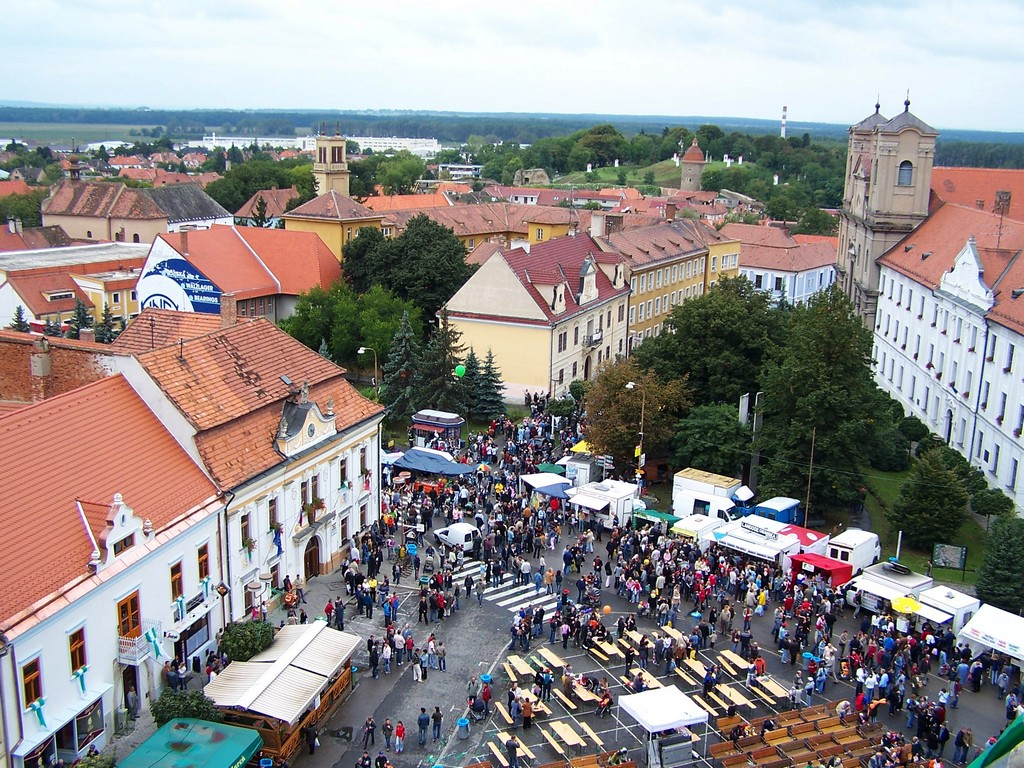
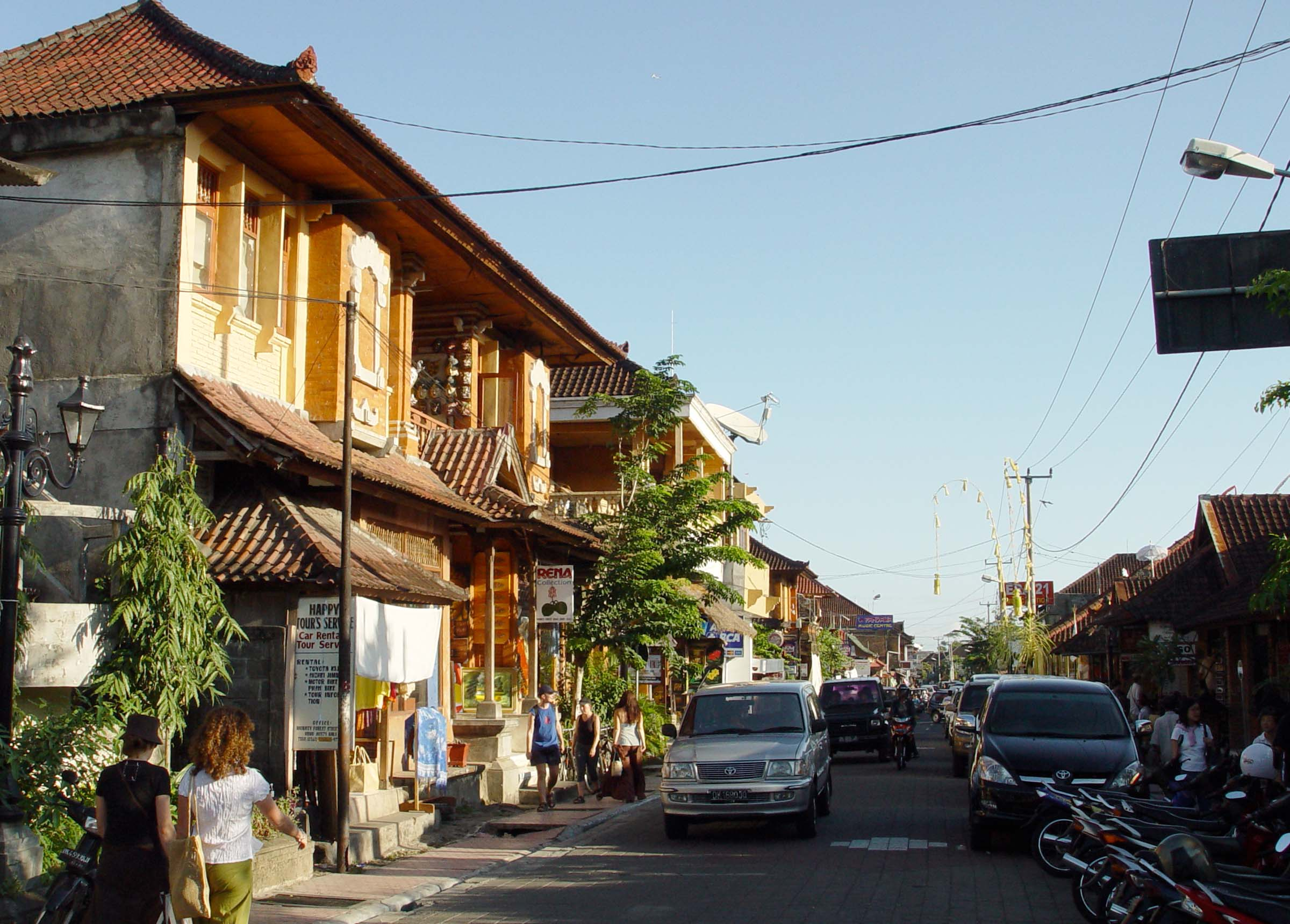
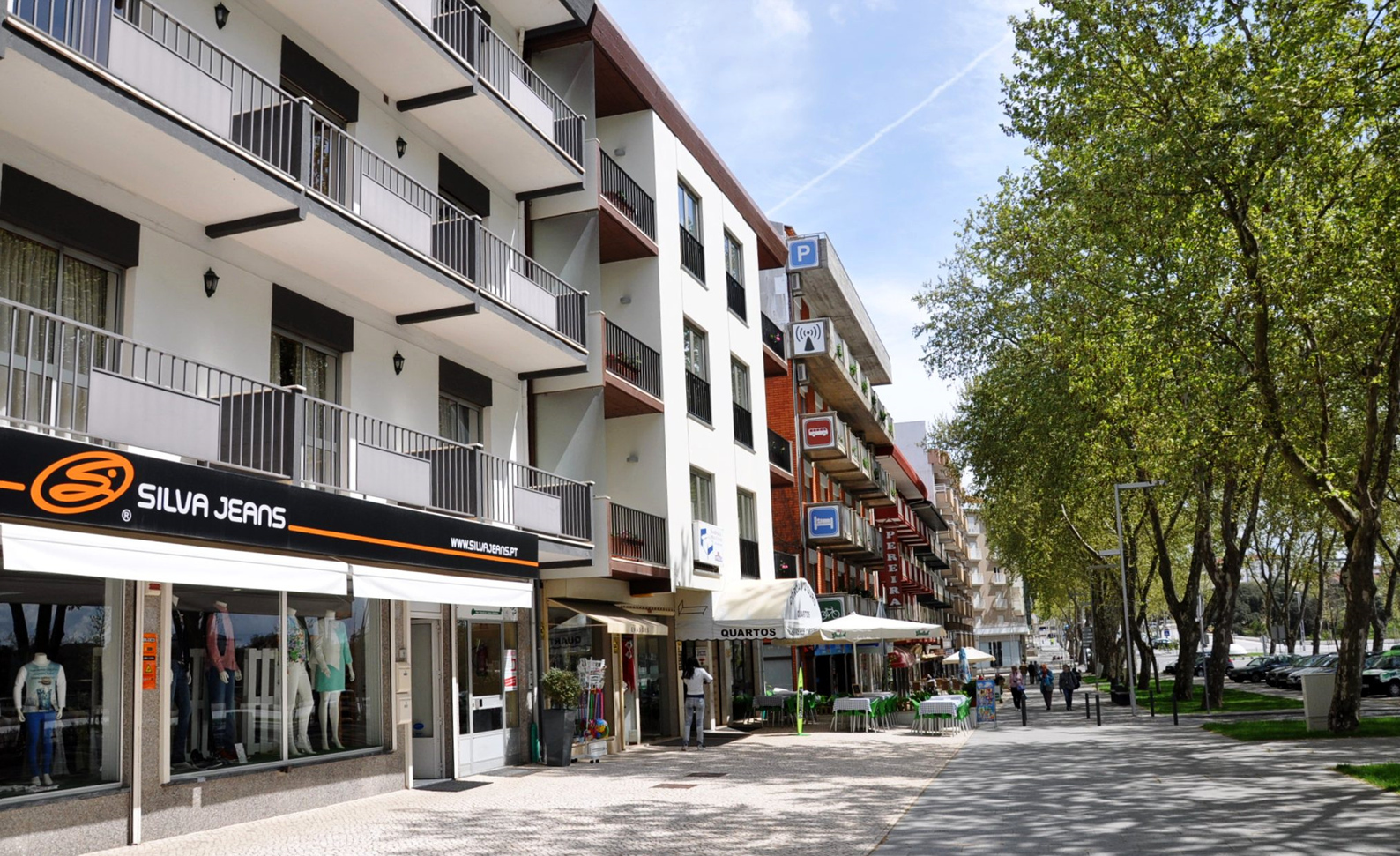
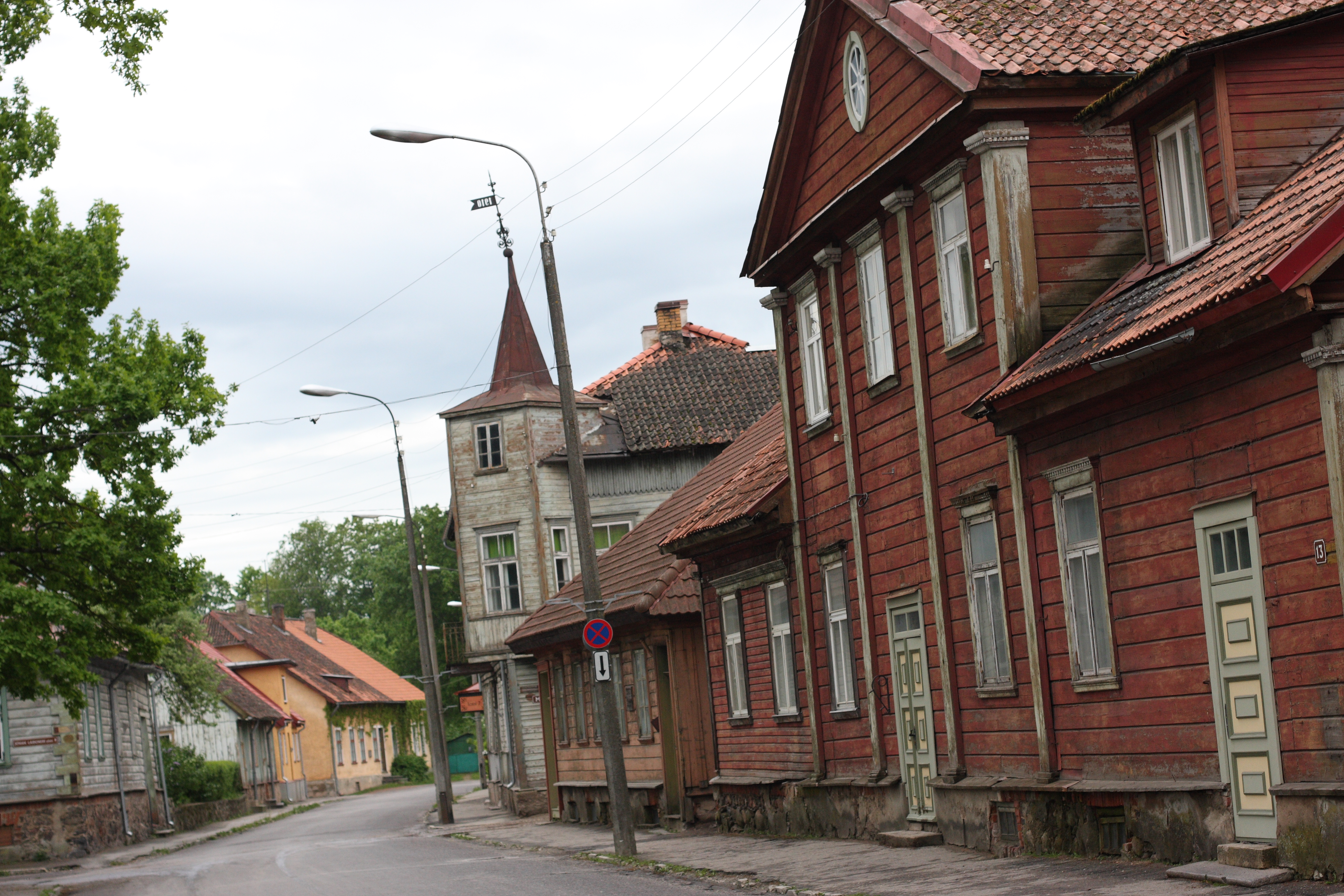
Left to right, from top: Ipswich in England, Porvoo in Finland, Lemgo in Germany, Davos in Switzerland, Skalica in Slovakia, Ubud in Bali (Indonesia), Fátima in Portugal, Viljandi in Estonia.

A town is a type of a human settlement, generally larger than a village but smaller than a city.

The criteria for distinguishing a town vary globally, often depending on factors such as population size, economic character, administrative status, or historical significance. In some regions, towns are formally defined by legal charters or government designations, while in others, the term is used informally. Towns typically feature centralized services, infrastructure, and governance, such as municipal authorities, and serve as hubs for commerce, education, and cultural activities within their regions.

The concept of a town varies culturally and legally. For example, in the United Kingdom, a town may historically derive its status from a market town designation or royal charter, while in the United States, the term is often loosely applied to incorporated municipalities. In some countries, such as Australia and Canada, distinctions between towns, cities, and rural areas are based on population thresholds. Globally, towns play diverse roles, ranging from agricultural service centers to suburban communities within metropolitan areas.

== Etymology ==
The word "town" shares an origin with the German word Zaun ("fence"), the Dutch word tuin ("garden, yard; fence, enclosure"), and the Old Norse tún ("enclosure, as for a homestead"). The original Proto-Germanic word, *tūną, is thought to be an early borrowing from *dūnom (cf. Old Irish dún, Welsh din).

The original sense of the word in both Germanic and Celtic was that of a fortress or an enclosure. Cognates of the English word town in many modern Germanic languages designate a "fence" or a "hedge". In English and Dutch, the meaning of the word took on the sense of the space which these fences enclosed, and through which a track must run. In England, a "town" was a small community that could not afford or was not allowed to build walls or other larger fortifications, and built a palisade or stockade instead. In the Netherlands, this space was a garden, more specifically those of the wealthy, which had a high fence or a wall around them (like the garden of the palace of Het Loo in Apeldoorn, which was the model for the privy garden of William III and Mary II at Hampton Court). In Old Norse tún means a (grassy) place between farmhouses, and the word is still used with a similar meaning in modern Norwegian.

Old English tūn became a common place-name suffix in England and southeastern Scotland during the Anglo-Saxon settlement period. In Old English and Early and Middle Scots, the words ton, toun, etc. could refer to diverse kinds of settlements from agricultural estates and holdings, partly picking up the Norse sense (as in the Scots word fermtoun) at one end of the scale, to fortified municipalities. Other common Anglo-Saxon suffixes included ham 'home', stede 'stead', and burh 'bury, borough, burgh'.

In toponymic terminology, names of individual towns and cities are called astyonyms or astionyms (from Ancient Greek ἄστυ 'town, city', and ὄνομα 'name').

== Meaning ==
In some cases, town is an alternative name for "city" or "village" (especially a small city or large village; and occasionally even hamlets). Sometimes, the word town is short for township. In general, towns today can be differentiated from townships, villages, or hamlets on the basis of their economic character, in that most of a town's population will tend to derive their living from manufacturing industry, commerce, and public services rather than primary sector industries such as agriculture or related activities.

A place's population size is not a reliable determinant of urban character. In many areas of the world, e.g. in India at least until recent times, a large village might contain several times as many people as a small town. In the United Kingdom, there are historical cities that are far smaller than the larger towns.

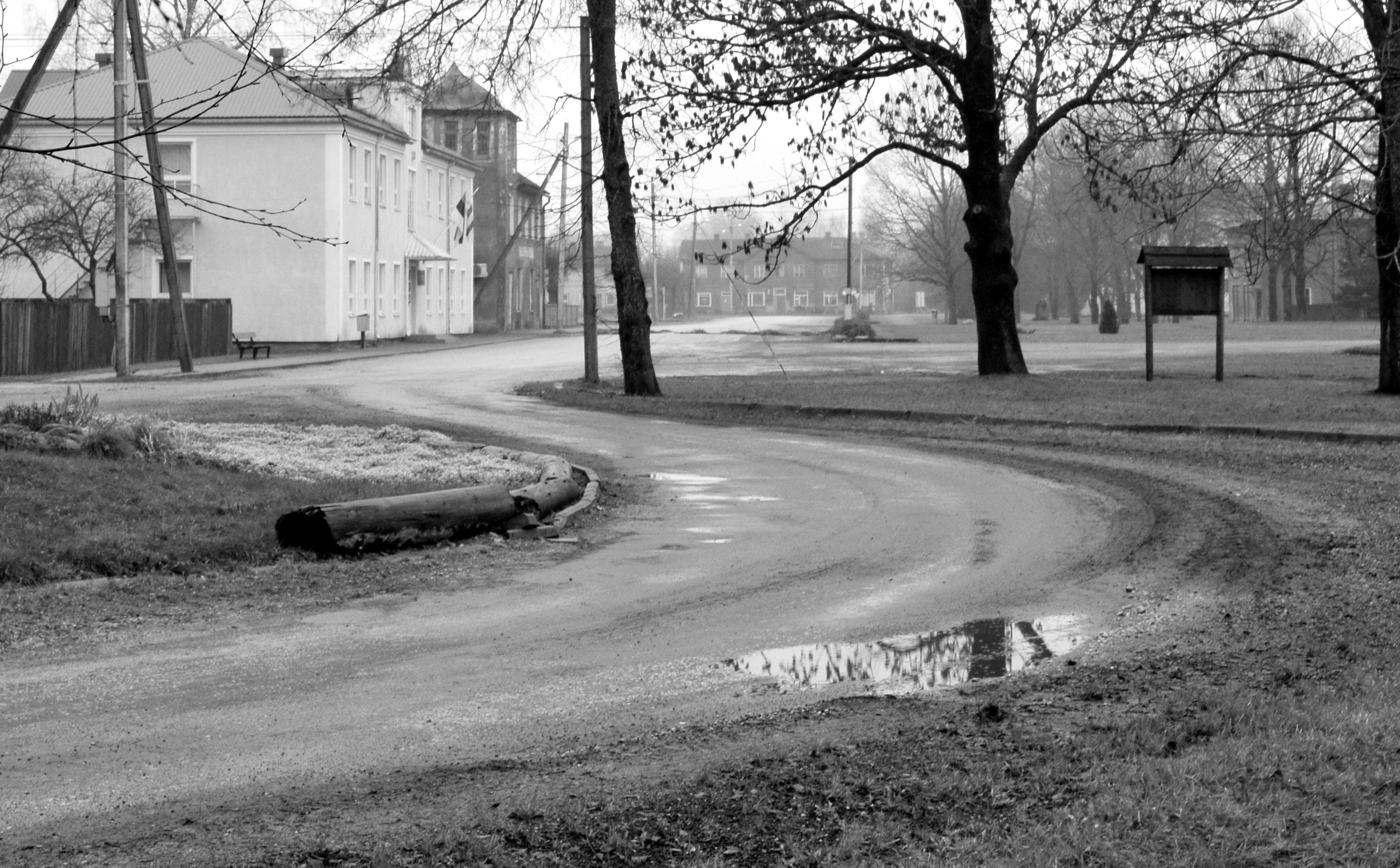
Mõisaküla is a small town in the southern part of Estonia, just next to the border of Latvia. The town's current population is less than 1,000 inhabitants.

The modern phenomenon of extensive suburban growth, satellite urban development, and migration of city dwellers to villages has further complicated the definition of towns, creating communities urban in their economic and cultural characteristics but lacking other characteristics of urban localities.

Some forms of non-rural settlement, such as temporary mining locations, may be clearly non-rural, but have at best a questionable claim to be called a town.

Towns often exist as distinct governmental units, with legally defined borders and some or all of the appurtenances of local government (e.g. a police force). In the United States these are referred to as "incorporated towns". In other cases the town lacks its own governance and is said to be "unincorporated". The existence of an unincorporated town may be legally set out by other means, e.g. zoning districts. In the case of some planned communities, the town exists legally in the form of covenants on the properties within the town. The United States census identifies many census-designated places (CDPs) by the names of unincorporated towns which lie within them; however, those CDPs typically include rural and suburban areas and even surrounding villages and other towns.

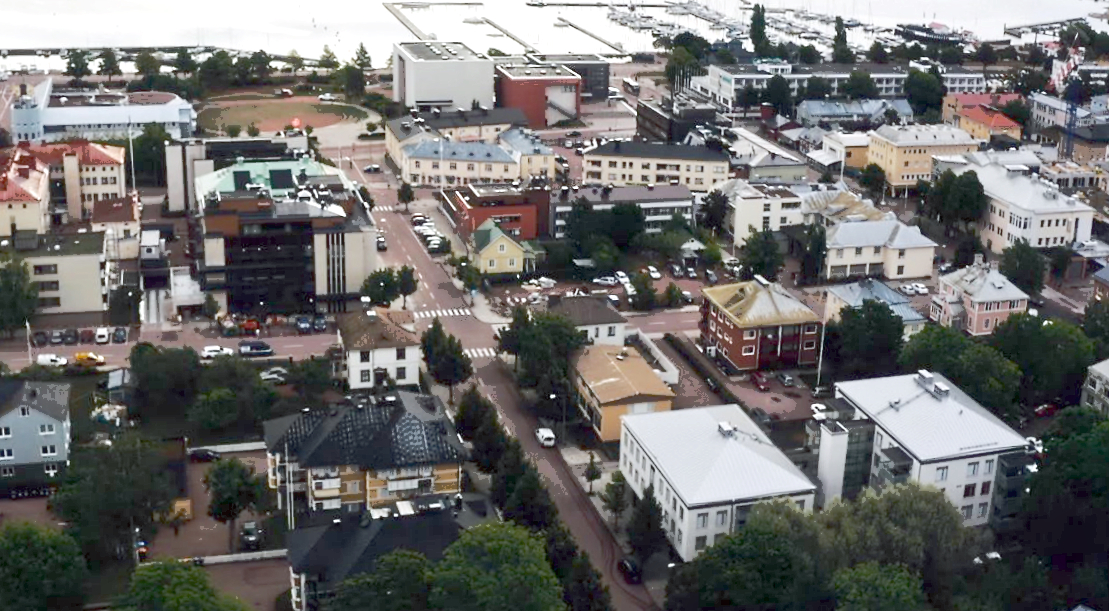
Aerial view of Mariehamn, the town in Åland with over 10,000 inhabitants

The distinction between a town and a city similarly depends on the approach: a city may strictly be an administrative entity which has been granted that designation by law, but in informal usage, the term is also used to denote an urban locality of a particular size or importance: whereas a medieval city may have possessed as few as 10,000 inhabitants, today some consider an urban place of fewer than 100,000 as a town, even though there are many officially designated cities that are much smaller than that.

Starting in March 2021, the then-193 member states of the United Nations have been involved in an effort led by EU aparatusses to agree on a common statistical definition of cities, towns and rural areas.

=== Age of towns scheme ===
Australian geographer Thomas Griffith Taylor proposed a classification of towns based on their age and pattern of land use. He identified five types of towns:

- Infantile towns, with no clear zoning
- Juvenile towns, which have developed an area of shops
- Adolescent towns, where factories have started to appear
- Early mature towns, with a separate area of high-class housing
- Mature towns, with defined industrial, commercial and various types of residential area

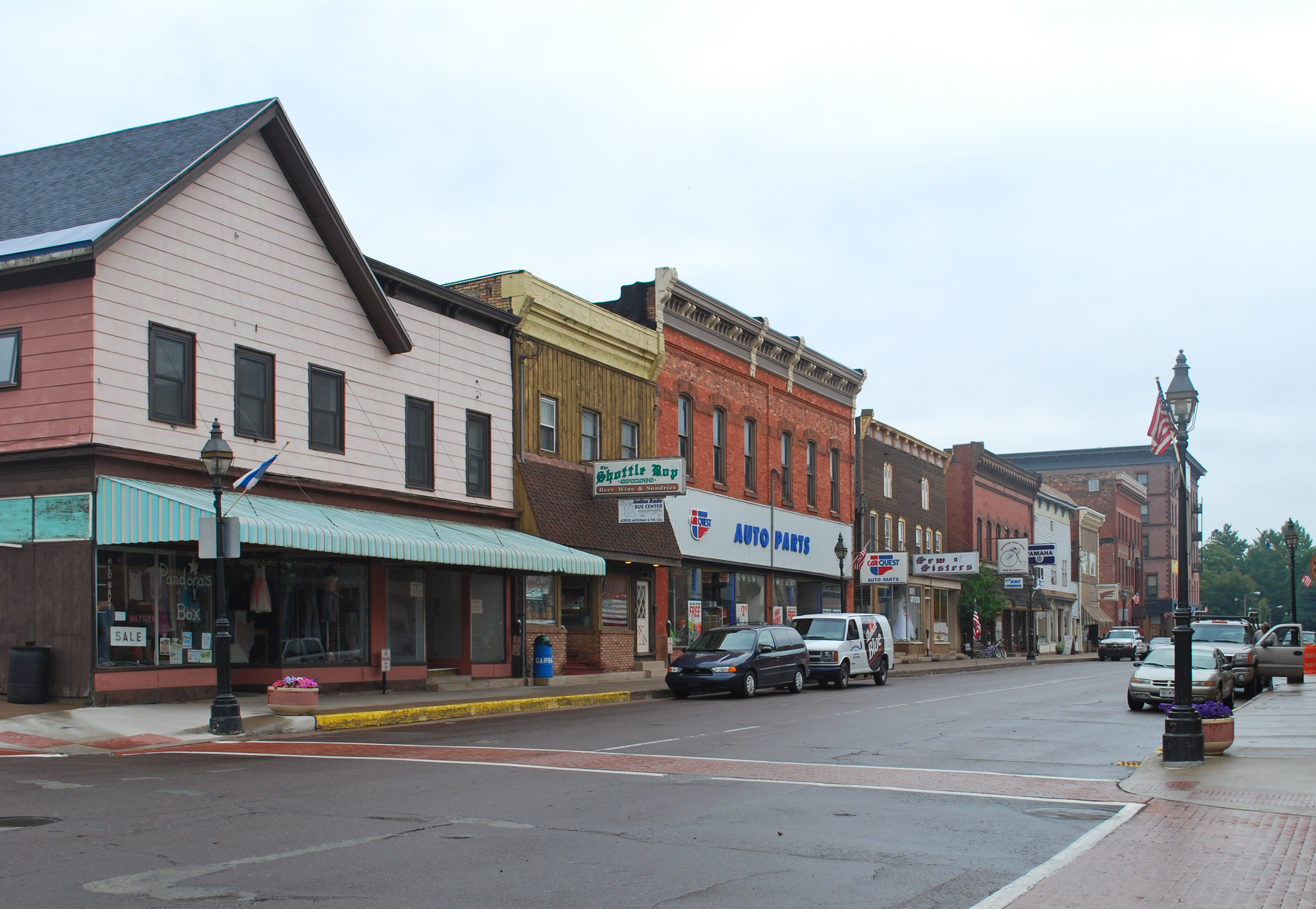
The city of Hancock, Michigan along Quincy Street

== History ==
Çatalhöyük, currently an archaeological site, was considered to be the oldest inhabited town, or proto-city, that existed from around 7100 BC.

=== Roman era ===
In Roman times, a villa was a rural settlement formed by a main residential building and another series of secondary buildings. It constituted the center from which an agricultural holding was administered. These are sometimes referred to as villa rustica (country villa), which consist of modest farmhouses. With the consolidation of large estates during the Roman Empire, the town became the center of large farms.

A distinction was created between rustic and urban settlements:

- Country villas (villa rustica), from where the exploitation of resources was directed, slave workers resided, livestock were kept and production was stored.
- Urban villas (pars urbana), in which the lord resided and which increasingly adopted the architectural and beautification forms typical of urban mansions. When from the first century the great territorial property was divided between the area directly exploited by the lord and that ceded to tenant settlers, urban villas became the centers of the administrative power of the lords, appearing the forms of vassalage typical of feudalism of the fourth century.

== By country ==
=== Afghanistan ===
In Afghanistan, a city and a town are both referred to as shahr (Dari: شهر; Pashto: ښار). The capital of each of its 34 provinces may include a major city such as Kabul whose population is over five million people or a town such as Parun, the capital of Nuristan Province, whose population is less than 20,000 people.

=== Albania ===
In Albania qytezë means 'town', which is very similar to the word for city (qytet), although there is no official use of the term for any settlement. In Albanian, qytezë means 'small city' or 'new city', while in ancient times it referred to a small residential center within the walls of a castle.

=== Australia ===
In Australia, most rural and regional centres of population can be called towns; many small towns have populations of less than 200. The smallest may be described as townships.

In addition, some local government entities are officially styled as towns in Queensland, South Australia, Western Australia and the Northern Territory, and formerly also (till the 1990s) in Victoria.

=== Austria ===
The Austrian legal system does not distinguish between villages, towns, and cities. The country is partitioned into 2098 municipalities (German: Gemeinden) of fundamentally equal rank. Larger municipalities are designated as market towns (German: Marktgemeinden) or cities (Städte), but these distinctions are purely symbolic and do not confer additional legal responsibilities. There is a number of smaller communities that are labelled cities because they used to be regional population centers in the distant past. The city of Rattenberg for example has about 400 inhabitants. The city of Hardegg has about 1200 inhabitants.

There are no unincorporated areas.

Of the 201 cities in Austria, 15 are statutory cities (Statutarstädte). A statutory city is a city that is vested, in addition to its purview as a municipality, with the duties of a district administrative authority. The status does not come with any additional autonomy: district administrative authorities are essentially just service centers that citizens use to interact with the national government, for example to apply for driver licenses or passports. The national government generally uses the provinces to run these points of contact on its behalf; in the case of statutory cities, the municipality gets to step up.

=== Brazil ===
In Brazil, since 1938, it was defined that the seat of the municipalities would pass to the category of city and give it the name and the districts would be designated by the name of their respective seats, and if they were not municipal seats, they would have the category of town.

=== Bulgaria ===
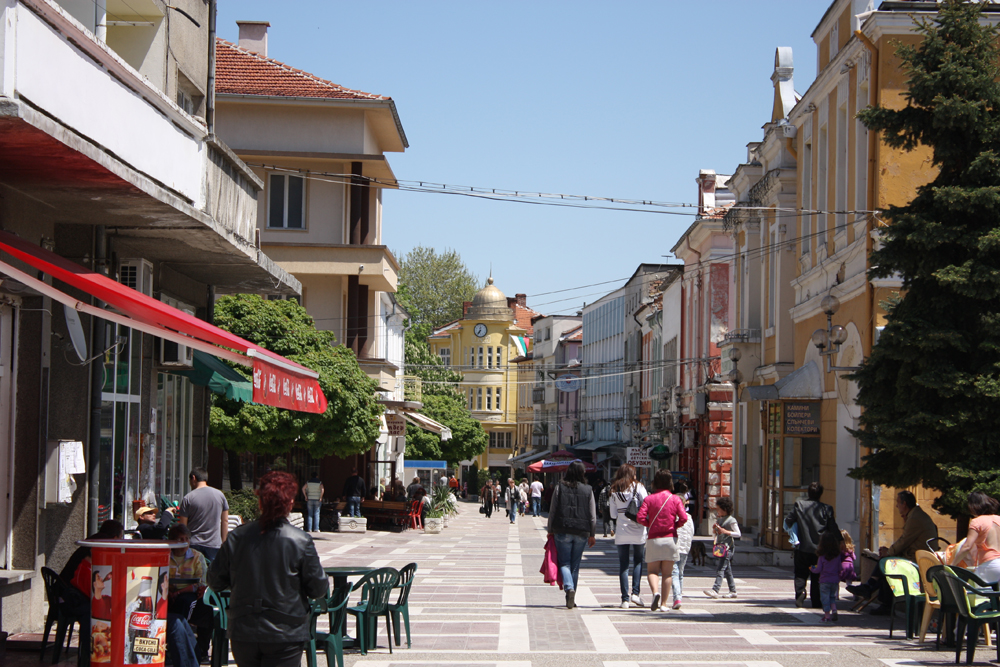
The town of Peshtera, Bulgaria

Bulgarians do not, in general, differentiate between 'city' and 'town'. However, in everyday language and media the terms "large towns" and "small towns" are in use. "Large towns" usually refers to Sofia, Plovdiv, Varna and Burgas, which have population over 200,000. Ruse and Stara Zagora are often included as well due to presence of relatively developed infrastructure and population over 100,000 threshold. It is difficult to call the remaining provincial capitals "large towns" as, in general, they are less developed and have shrinking population, some with as few as 30,000 inhabitants.

In Bulgaria the Council of Ministers defines what constitutes a settlement, while the President of Bulgaria grants each settlement its title. In 2005 the requirement that villages that wish to classify themselves as town must have a social and technical infrastructure, as well as a population of no fewer than 3500 people. For resort settlements the requirements are lower with the population needing to be no fewer than 1000 people but infrastructure requirements remain.

=== Canada ===
The legal definition of a town in Canada varies by province or territory, as each has jurisdiction over defining and legislating towns, cities and other types of municipal organization within its own boundaries.

The province of Quebec is unique in that it makes no distinction under law between towns and cities. There is no intermediate level in French between village and ville (municipality is an administrative term usually applied to a legal, not geographical entity), so both are combined under the single legal status of ville. While an informal preference may exist among English speakers as to whether any individual ville is commonly referred to as a city or as a town, no distinction and no objective legal criteria exist to make such a distinction under law.

Ontario allows municipalities to select whichever administrative term they like with no legal distinction existing between towns, townships, cities, and villages. Instead all municipalities, with the exception of Toronto and Ottawa, fall into one of three legal categories under the Municipalities Act: Single-tier (I.e. towns that are located within a region or county but that are considered separate for municipal purposes such as Hamilton), lower-tier (i.e. municipalities that are part of a region or county such as St. Catharines), or upper-tier (i.e. regional municipalities such as Niagara). Accordingly, many larger municipalities continue to use the title of town due to it better reflecting the character of the municipality. For example, Oakville (2021 Population: 213,759) is the largest municipality to use the title of town to reflect its largely suburban character while other municipalities such as Richmond Hill (2021 Population: 202,022) have opted to change their status from "town" to "city" to encourage investment.

=== Chile ===
In Chile, towns (Spanish: pueblos) are defined by the National Statistics Institute (INE) as an urban entity with a population from 2001 to 5000 or an area with a population from 1001 to 2000 and an established economic activity.

=== Czech Republic ===
In the Czech Republic, a municipality can obtain the title of a city (Czech: statutární město), town (Czech: město) or market town (Czech: městys). The title is granted by law.

Statutory cities (in English usually called just "cities"), which are defined by law no. 128/2000 Coll., can define their own self-governing municipal districts. There are 26 such cities, in addition to Prague, which is a de facto statutory city. All the Czech municipalities with more than 40,000 inhabitants are cities.

Town and market town are above all ceremonious honorary degrees, referring to population, history and regional significance of a municipality. As the statistics of Czech municipalities shows, towns usually have between 1,000 and 35,000 inhabitants, with median around 4,000 and average around 6,500. Nowadays a municipality must have at least 3,000 inhabitants to have the right to request the town title. Market towns usually have between 500 and 4,000 inhabitants, with median and average both around 1,000.

=== Denmark ===
In Denmark, in many contexts no distinction is made between "city", "town" and "village"; all three translate as by. In more specific use, for small villages and hamlets the word landsby (meaning 'country town') is used, while the Danish equivalent of English city is storby (meaning 'large town'). For formal purposes, urban areas having at least 200 inhabitants are considered by.

Historically some towns held various privileges, the most important of which was the right to hold market. They were administered separately from the rural areas in both fiscal, military and legal matters. Such towns are known as købstad (roughly the same meaning as borough albeit deriving from a different etymology) and they retain the exclusive right to the title even after the last vestiges of their privileges vanished through the reform of the local administration carried through in 1970.

=== Estonia ===
In Estonia, there is no distinction between a town and a city as the word linn is used for both bigger and smaller settlements, which are bigger than villages and boroughs. There are 30 municipal towns (omavalitsuslik linn) in Estonia and a further 17 towns, which have merged with a municipal parish (vallasisene linn).

=== Finland ===
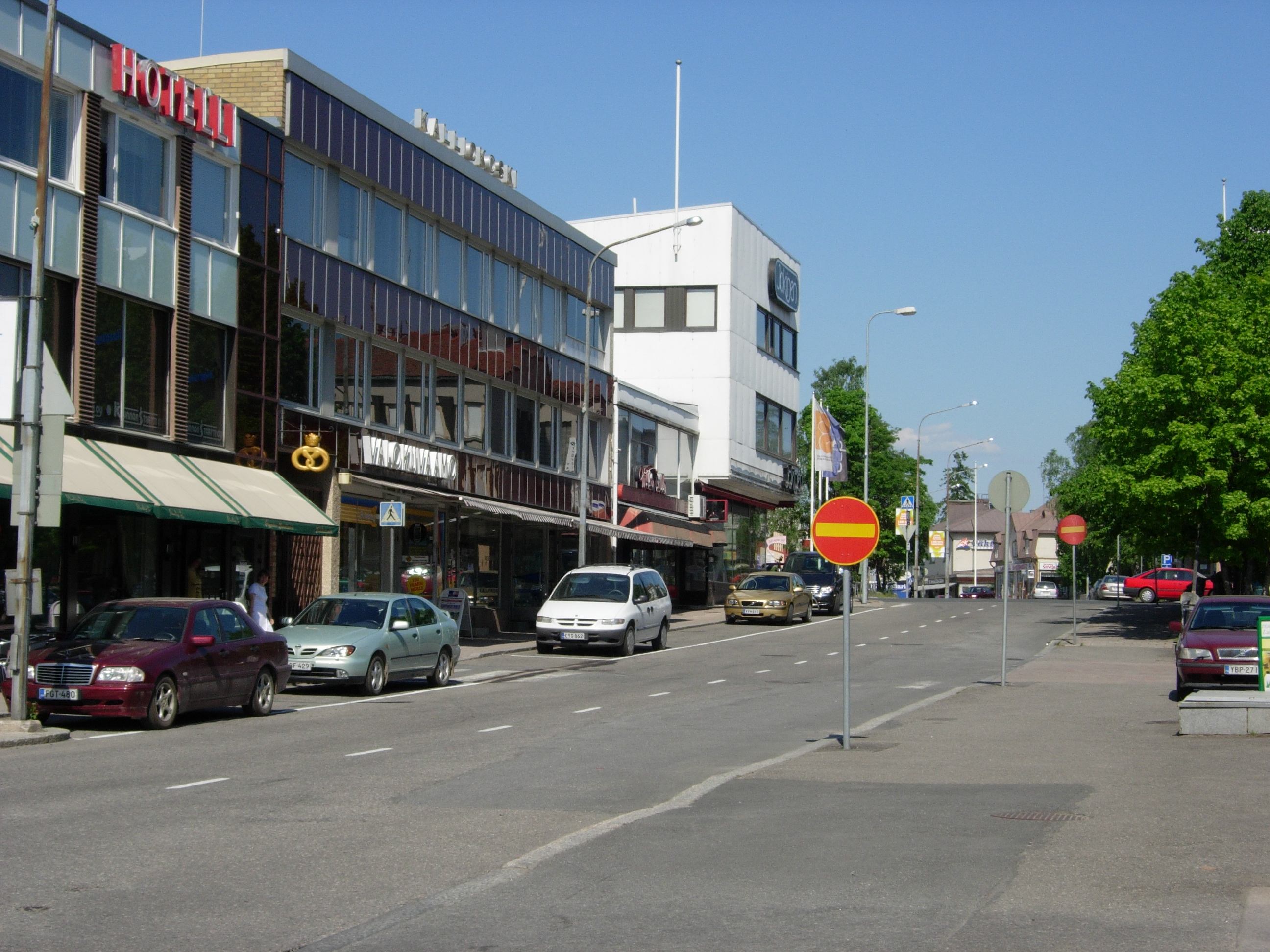
The town of Sastamala, Finland

In Finland, there is no distinction between a town and a city as the word kaupunki is used for both bigger and smaller settlements, which are bigger than villages and boroughs; although when talking about the word town, the word pikkukaupunki is used (pikku means 'little' or 'small'). There are over one hundred municipal towns in Finland.

=== France ===
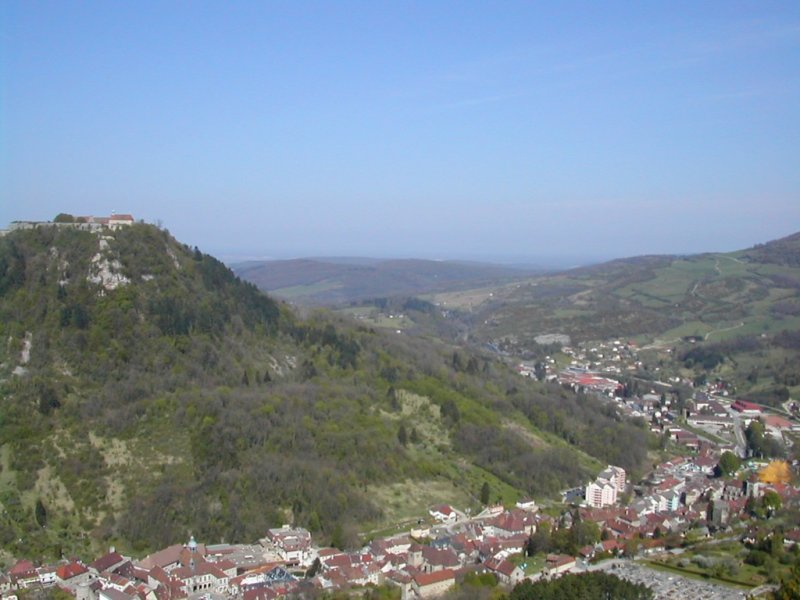
The town of Salins-les-Bains, France

From an administrative standpoint, the smallest level of local authorities are all called communes. They can have anywhere from a handful to millions of inhabitants, and France has 36,000 of them. The French term for town is bourg but French laws generally do not distinguish between towns and cities which are all commonly called villes. However, some laws do treat these authorities differently based on the population and different rules apply to the three big cities Paris, Lyon and Marseille. For historical reasons, six communes in the Meuse département exist as independent administrative entities despite having no inhabitants at all.

For statistical purposes, the national statistical institute (INSEE) operates a distinction between urban areas with fewer than 2,000 inhabitants and bigger communes, the latter being called villes. Smaller settlements are usually called villages.

=== Germany ===
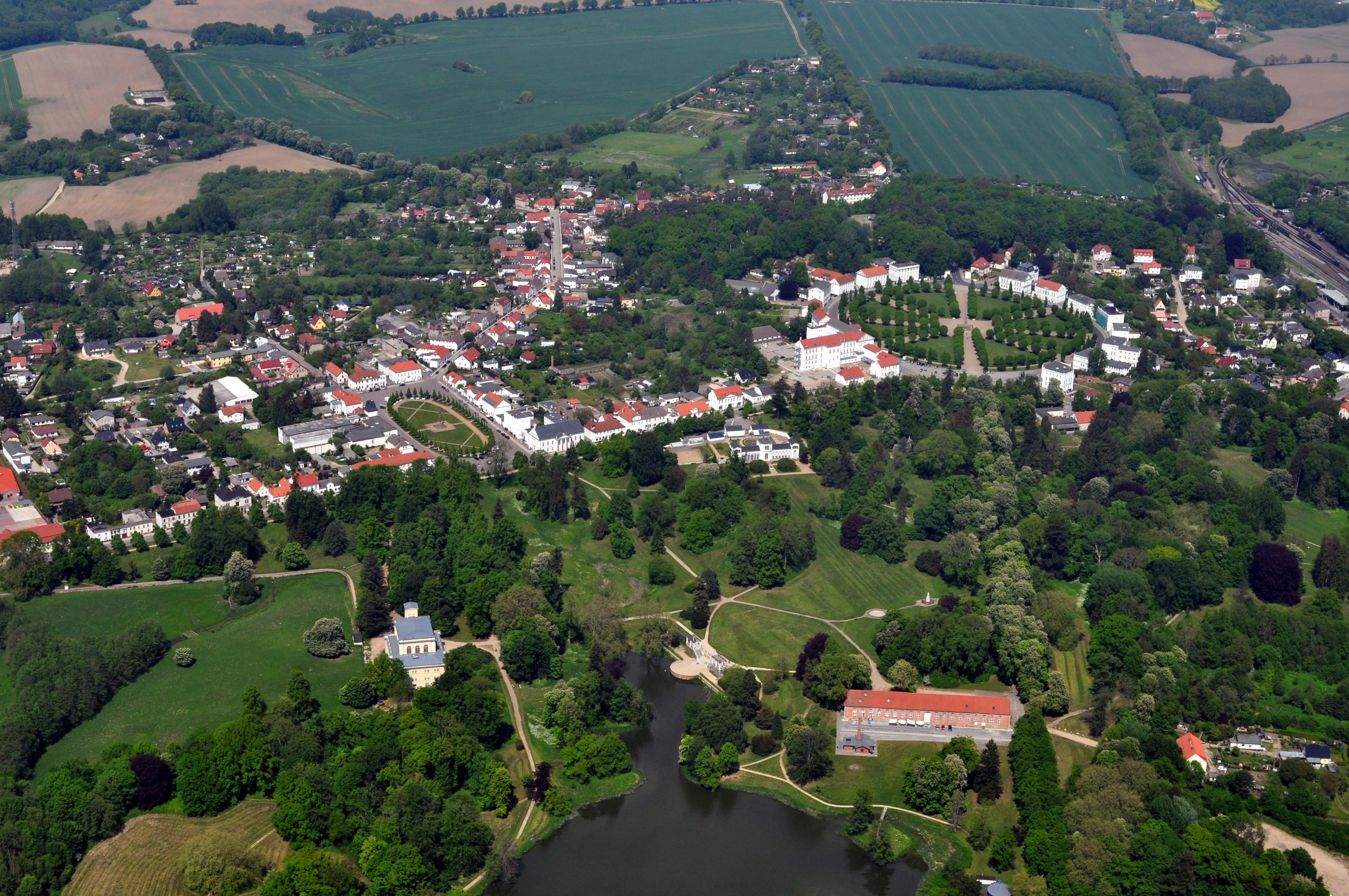
Putbus on Rügen Island, Germany

Germans do not, in general, differentiate between 'city' and 'town'. The German word for both is Stadt, as it is the case in many other languages that do not differentiate between these concepts. The word for a 'village', as a smaller settlement, is Dorf. However, the International Statistics Conference of 1887 defined different sizes of Stadt, based on their population size, as follows: Landstadt ('country town'; under 5,000), Kleinstadt ('small town'; 5,000 to 20,000), Mittelstadt ('middle town'; between 20,000 and 100,000) and Großstadt ("large town"; 100,000 to 1,000,000). The term Großstadt may be translated as 'city'. In addition, Germans may speak of a Millionenstadt, a city with anywhere between one and five million inhabitants (such as Cologne, Munich, Hamburg and Berlin). Also, a city with more than five million inhabitants is often referred to as a Megastadt (commonly translated as megacity).

Historically, many settlements became a Stadt by being awarded a Stadtrecht in medieval times. In modern German language use, the historical importance, the existence of central functions (education, retail etc.) and the population density of an urban place might also be taken as characteristics of a Stadt. The modern local government organisation is subject to the laws of each state and refers to a Gemeinde (municipality), regardless of its historic title. While most Gemeinden form part of a Landkreis (district) on a higher tier of local government, larger towns and cities may have the status of a kreisfreie Stadt, combining both the powers of a municipality and a district.

Designations in different states are as diverse as e.g. in Australian States and Territories, and differ from state to state. In some German states, the words Markt ('market'), Marktflecken (both used in southern Germany) or Flecken ('spot'; northern Germany e.g. in Lower Saxony) designate a town-like residential community between Gemeinde and Stadt with special importance to its outer conurbation area. Historically those had Marktrecht (market right) but not full town privileges; see Market town. The legal denomination of a specific settlement may differ from its common designation (e.g. Samtgemeinde – a legal term in Lower Saxony for a group of villages [Dorf, pl. Dörfer] with common local government created by combining municipalities [Gemeinde, pl. Gemeinden]).

=== Greece and Cyprus ===
In ordinary speech, Greeks use the word χωριό ('village') to refer to smaller settlements and the word πόλη or πολιτεία ('city') to refer to larger ones. Careful speakers may also use the word κωμόπολη to refer to towns with a population of 2,000–9,999.

In Greek administrative law there used to be a distinction between δήμοι, i.e. municipalities with more than 10,000 inhabitants or considered important for some other geographical (county seats), historical or ecclesiastical (bishops' seats) reason, and κοινότητες, referring to smaller self-governing units, mostly villages. A sweeping reform, carried out in two stages early in the 21st century, merged most κοινότητες with the nearest δήμοι, dividing the whole country into 325 self-governing δήμοι. The former municipalities survive as administrative subdivisions (δημοτικά διαμερίσματα, δημοτικές ενότητες).

Cyprus, including the Turkish-occupied areas, is also divided into 39 δήμοι (in principle, with at least 5,000 inhabitants, though there are exceptions) and 576 κοινότητες.

=== Hong Kong ===
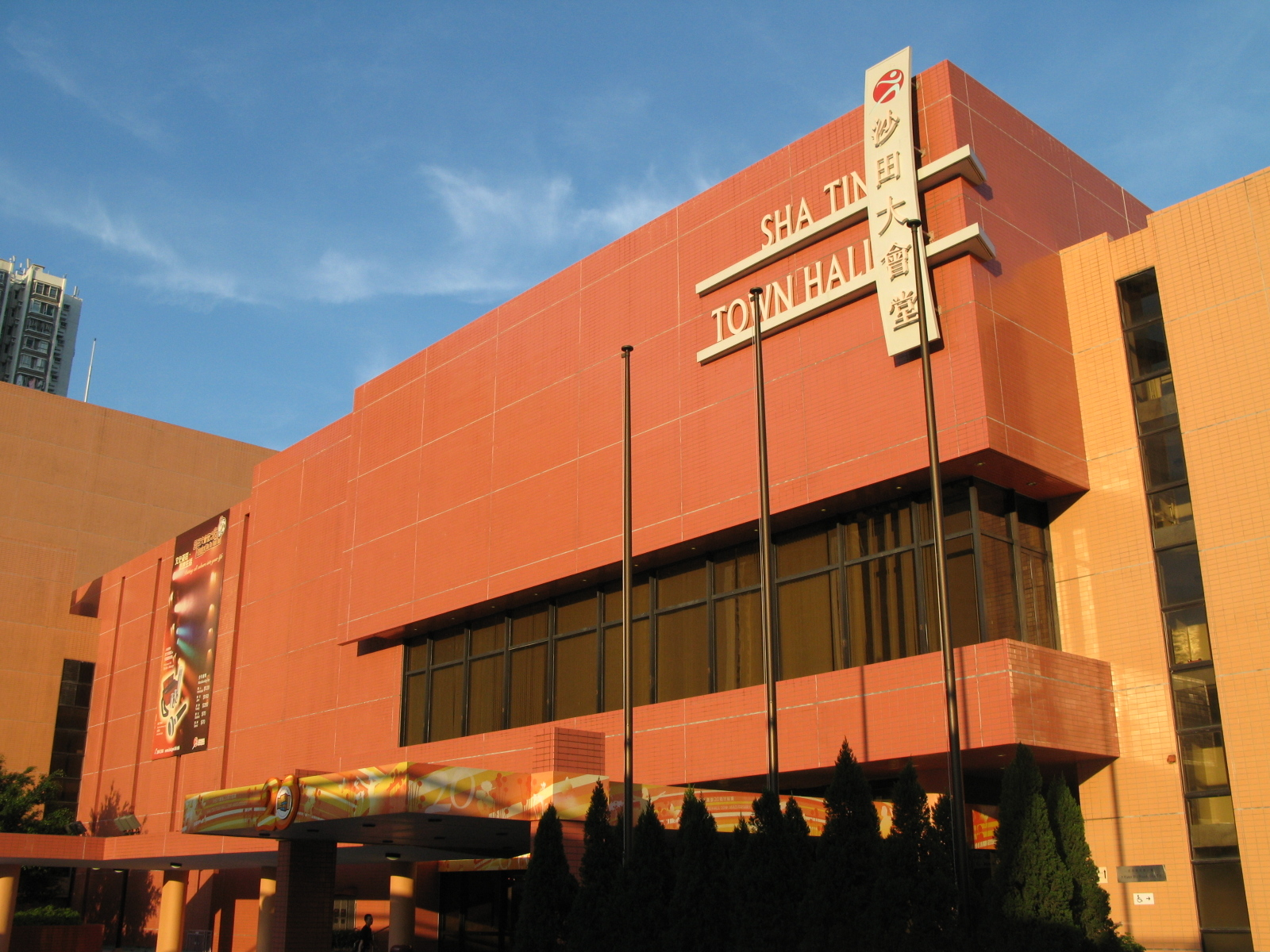
Nearly every town in Hong Kong has its own town hall. The picture shows the Sha Tin Town Hall in the town of Sha Tin.

Hong Kong started developing new towns in the 1950s, to accommodate exponential population increase. The first new towns included Tsuen Wan and Kwun Tong. In the late 1960s and the 1970s, another stage of new town developments was launched. Nine new towns have been developed so far. Land use is carefully planned and development provides plenty of room for public housing projects. Rail transport is usually available at a later stage. The first towns are Sha Tin, Tsuen Wan, Tuen Mun and Tseung Kwan O. Tuen Mun was intended to be self-reliant, but was not successful and turned into a bedroom community like the other new towns. More recent developments are Tin Shui Wai and North Lantau (Tung Chung-Tai Ho).

=== Hungary ===
In Hungary there is no official distinction between a city and a town (the word for both in Hungarian is város). Nevertheless, the expressions formed by adding the adjectives kis ('small') and nagy ('large') to the beginning of the root word (e.g. nagyváros) have been normalized to differentiate between cities and towns (towns being smaller, therefore bearing the name kisváros.) In Hungary, a village can gain the status of város ('town'), if it meets a set of diverse conditions for quality of life and development of certain public services and utilities (e.g. having a local secondary school or installing full-area sewage collection pipe network). Every year the Minister of Internal Affairs selects candidates from a committee-screened list of applicants, whom the President of Republic usually affirms by issuing a bill of town's rank to them. Since being a town carries extra fiscal support from the government, many relatively small villages try to win the status of városi rang ('town rank') nowadays.

Before the fall of communism in 1990, Hungarian villages with fewer than 10,000 residents were not allowed to become towns. Recently some settlements as small as 2,500 people have received the rank of town (e.g. Visegrád, Zalakaros or Gönc) and meeting the conditions of development is often disregarded to quickly elevate larger villages into towns. As of middle 2013, there are 346 towns in Hungary, encompassing some 69% of the entire population.

Towns of more than 50,000 people are able to gain the status of megyei jogú város (town with the rights of a county), which allows them to maintain a higher degree of services. (There are a few exceptions, when towns of fewer than 50,000 people gained the status: Érd, Hódmezővásárhely, Salgótarján and Szekszárd) As of middle 2013, there are only 23 such towns in Hungary.

=== Iceland ===
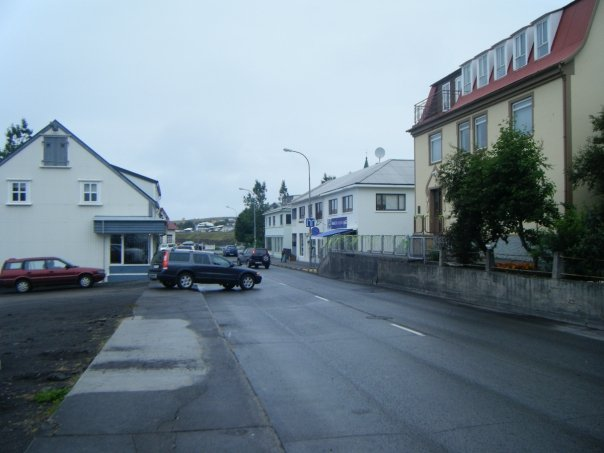
Town of Húsavík in Iceland

=== India ===
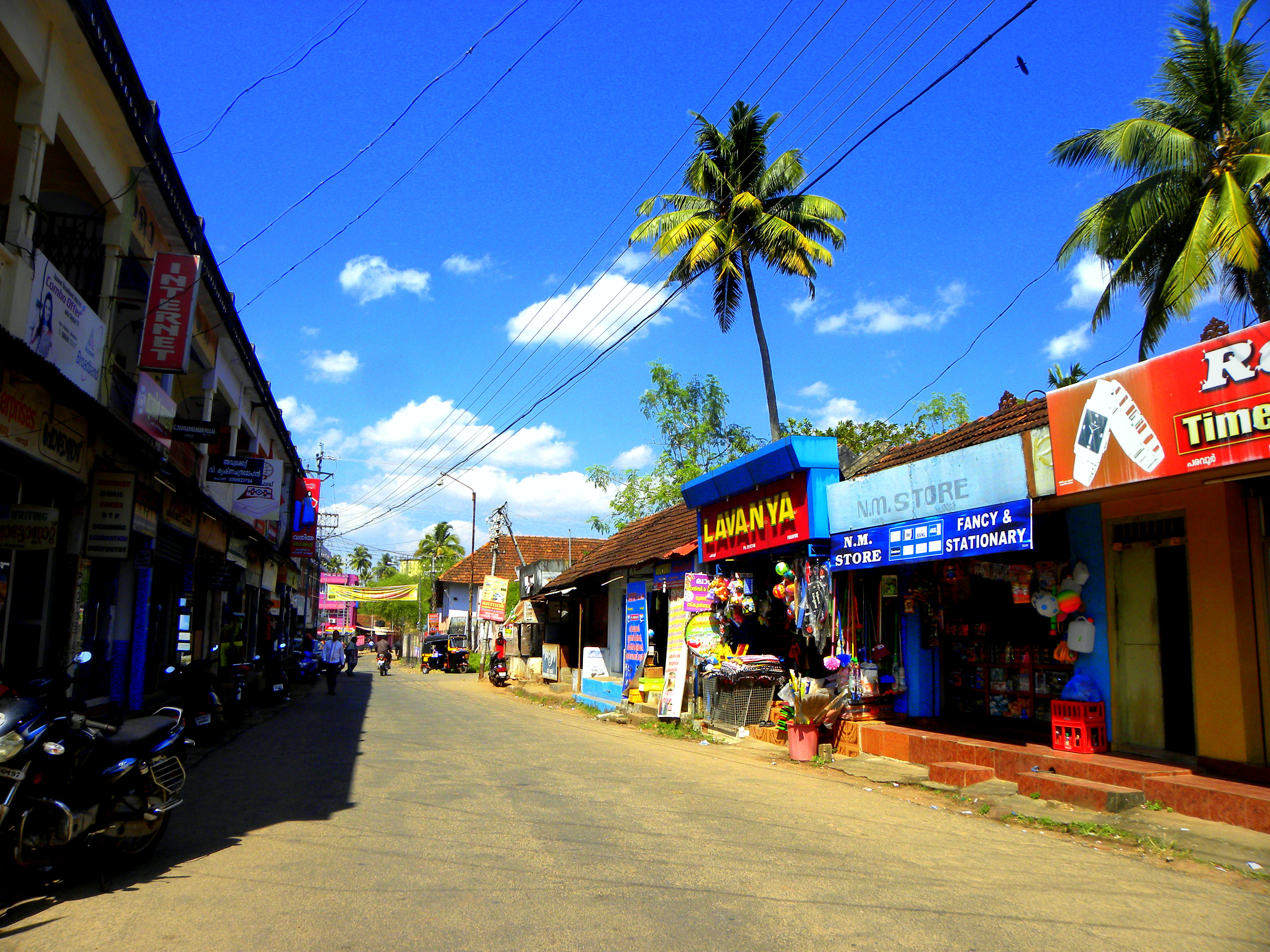
A street in Paravur town, India

The 2011 Census of India defines towns of two types: statutory town and census town. Statutory town is defined as all places with a municipality, corporation, cantonment board or notified town area committee. Census towns are defined as places that satisfy the following criteria:

1. Minimum population of 5,000
2. At least 75% of male working population engaged in non-agricultural pursuits
3. Density of population at least 400/km^{2}. (1,000 per sq. mile).

All the statutory towns, census towns and out growths are considered as urban settlements, as opposed to rural areas.

Towns in India usually have basic infrastructure like shops, electricity, bitumenised roads, post offices, banks, telephone facilities, high schools and sometimes a few government offices. The human population living in these towns may be a few thousand. There are some towns which can be labelled as Main road town.

In state of Karnataka, towns are known as Pete or Pura in the Kannada language. Sometimes the terms pattana ('city') or ooru, which generally means 'place', are used for towns. The administrative council which governs these towns is known as Pura Sabhe or Nagara Sabhe in Kannada depending on the number of people living within the town's boundaries.

=== Iran ===
In contemporary Persian texts, no distinction is made between city and town; both translate as Shahr (شهر). In older Persian texts (until the first half of the 20th century), the Arabic word Qasabeh (قصبه) was used for a town. However, in the past 50 years, this word has become obsolete.

There is a word in Persian which is used for special sort of satellite townships and city neighborhoods. It is Shahrak (شهرک), (lit.: 'small city'). Another smaller type of town or neighborhood in a big city is called Kuy (کوی). Shahrak and Kuy each have different legal definitions. Large cities such as Tehran, Mashhad, Isfahan, Tabriz, etc. which have millions inhabitants are referred to as Kalan-shahr (کلان‌شهر), metropole.

The pace in which different large villages have gained city status in Iran shows a dramatic increase in the last two decades.

Bigger cities and towns usually are centers of a township (in Persian: Shahrestan (شهرستان). Shahrestan itself is a subdivision of Ostan (استان), 'province'.

=== Iraq ===
The word Jarayeh (جرَية) is used to describe villages, the word Garmat (كَرمة) to describe towns, and the word Wilaya (ولاية) to describe cities.

=== Ireland ===
The Local Government act 2001 provides that from 1 January 2002 (section 10 subsection (3)):

Within the county in which they are situated and of which they form part, there continue to be such other local government areas as are set out in Schedule 6 which –

- (a) in the case of the areas set out in Chapter 1 of Part 1 of that Schedule, shall be known as boroughs, and
- (b) in the case of the areas set out in Chapter 2 of Part 1 and Part 2 of that Schedule,

shall be known as towns, and in this Act a reference to a town shall include a reference to a borough.

These provisions affect the replacement of the boroughs, towns and urban districts which existed before then. Similar reforms in the nomenclature of local authorities (but not their functions) are affected by section 11 part 17 of the act includes provision (section 185(2))

Qualified electors of a town having a population of at least 7,500 as ascertained at the last preceding census or such other figure as the Minister may from time to time prescribe by regulations, and not having a town council, may make a proposal in accordance with paragraph (b) for the establishment of such a council

and contains provisions enabling the establishment of new town councils and provisions enabling the dissolution of existing or new town councils in certain circumstances

The reference to "town having a population of at least 7,500 as ascertained at the last preceding census" hands much of the power relating to defining what is in fact a town over to the Central Statistics Office and their criteria are published as part of each census.

==== Planning and Development Act 2000 ====
Another reference to the Census and its role in determining what is or is not a town for some administrative purpose is in the Planning and Development act 2000 (part II chapter I which provides for Local area plans):

A local area plan shall be made in respect of an area which—

- (i) is designated as a town in the most recent census of population, other than a town designated as a suburb or environs in that census,
- (ii) has a population in excess of 2,000, and
- (iii) is situated within the functional area of a planning authority which is a county council.

==== Central Statistics Office criteria ====
These are set out in full at 2006 Census Appendices.

In short they speak of "towns with legally defined boundaries" (i.e. those established by the Local Government Act 2001) and the remaining 664 as "census towns", defined by themselves since 1971 as "a cluster of 50 or more occupied dwellings in which within a distance of 800 meters there is a nucleus of 30 occupied houses on both sides of the road or twenty occupied Houses on one side of the road". There is also a "200 meter criterion" for determining whether a house is part of a census town.

=== Isle of Man ===
There are four settlements which are historically and officially designated as towns (Douglas, Ramsey, Peel, Castletown); however

- Peel is also sometimes referred to as a city by virtue of its cathedral.
- Onchan and Port Erin are both larger in population than the smallest "town", having expanded in modern times, but are designated as villages.

=== Israel ===
Modern Hebrew does provide a word for the concept of a town: Ayara (עיירה), derived from Ir (עיר), the biblical word for 'city'. However, the term ayara is normally used only to describe towns in foreign countries, i.e. urban areas of limited population, particularly when the speaker is attempting to evoke nostalgic or romantic attitudes. The term is also used to describe a shtetl, a pre-Holocaust Eastern European Jewish town.

Within Israel, established urban areas are always referred to as cities (with one notable exception explained below) regardless of their actual size. Israeli law does not define any nomenclature for distinction between urban areas based on size or any other factor – meaning that all urban settlements in Israel are legally referred to as "cities".

The exception to the above is the term Ayeret Pituakh (עיירת פיתוח, lit. 'Development Town') which is applied to certain cities in Israel based on the reasons for their establishment. These cities, created during the earlier decades of Israeli independence (1950s and 1960s, generally), were designed primarily to serve as commercial and transportation hubs, connecting smaller agricultural settlements in the northern and southern regions of the country (the "Periphery") to the major urban areas of the coastal and central regions. Some of these development towns have since grown to a comparatively large size, and yet are still referred to as development towns, particularly when the speaker wishes to emphasize their (often low) socio-economic status. Nonetheless, they are rarely (if ever) referred to simply as towns; when referring to one directly, it will be called either a development town or a city, depending on context.

=== Italy ===
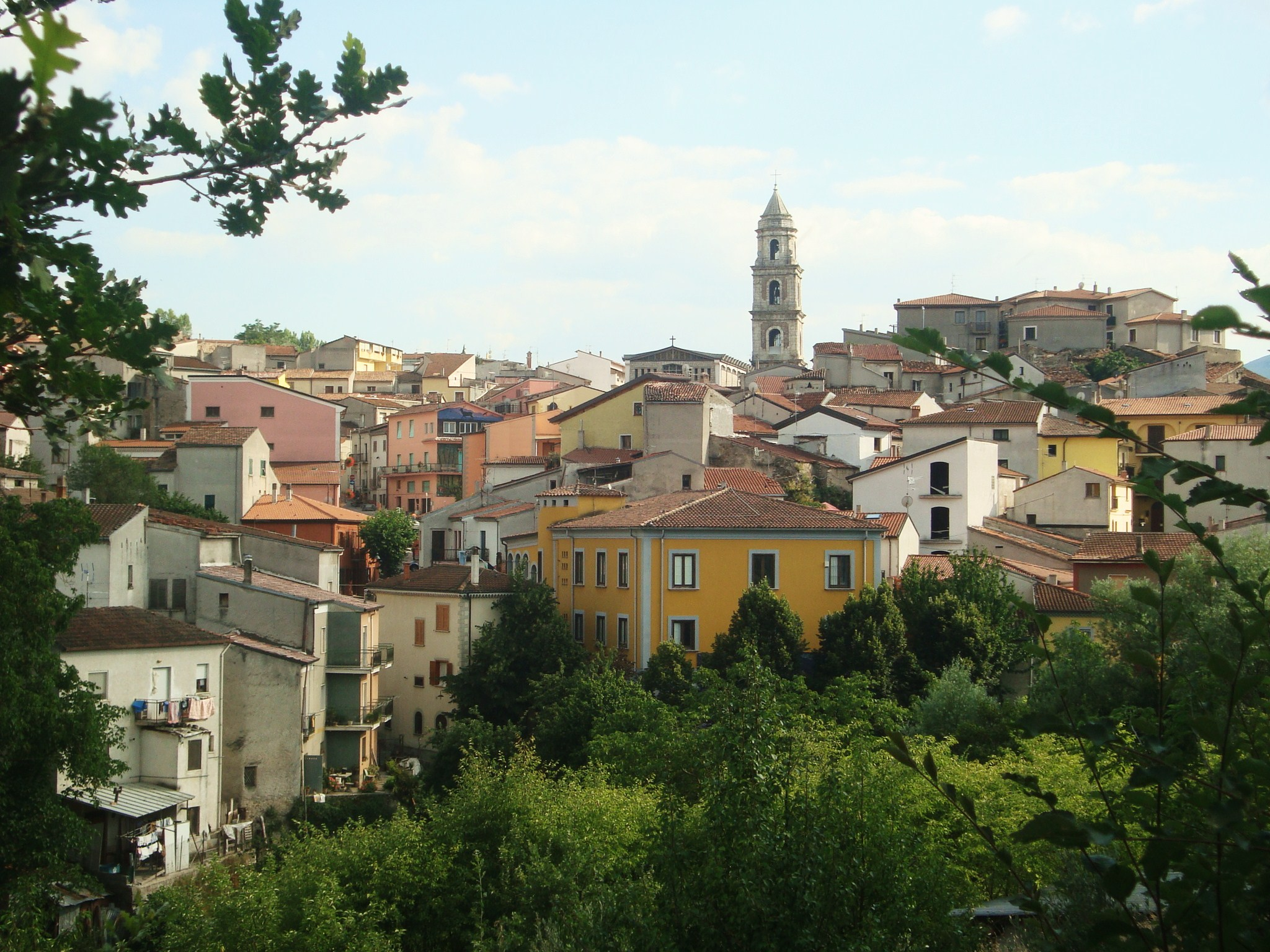
Satriano di Lucania, a town in the Melandro Valley, Basilicata, south Italy

Although Italian provides different words for city (città), town (cittadina or paese) and village (villaggio, old-fashioned, or frazione, most common), no legal definitions exist as to how settlements must be classified. Administratively, both towns and cities are ruled as comuni/comunes, while villages might be subdivisions of the former. Generally, in everyday speech, a town is larger or more populated than a village and smaller than a city. Various cities and towns together may form a metropolitan area (area metropolitana). A city can also be a culturally, economically, or politically prominent community with respect to surrounding towns. Moreover, a city can be such by Presidential decree. A town, in contrast, can be an inhabited place which would elsewhere be styled a city, but has not received any official recognition. Remarkable exceptions do exist: for instance, Bassano del Grappa, was given the status of città in 1760 by Francesco Loredan's dogal decree and has since then carried this title. Also, the Italian word for 'town' (paese with lowercase P) must not be confused with the Italian word for 'country/nation' (Paese usually with uppercase P).

=== Japan ===
In Japan, city status (市 shi) was traditionally reserved for only a few particularly large settlements. Over time however the necessary conditions to be a city have been watered down and today the only loose rules that apply are having a population over 50,000 and over 60% of the population in a "city centre". In recent times many small villages and towns have merged in order to form a city despite seeming geographically to be just a collection of villages.

The distinction between towns (町 machi/chō) and villages (村 mura/son) is largely unwritten and purely one of population size when the settlement was founded with villages having under 10,000 and towns 10,000–50,000.

=== Korea ===
In both of South Korea and North Korea, towns are called eup (읍). Most cities in North Korea are built around a central square. Perhaps it is to symbolize the importance of the society over the individual, or just a handy place for mass gatherings and celebrations.

=== Latvia ===
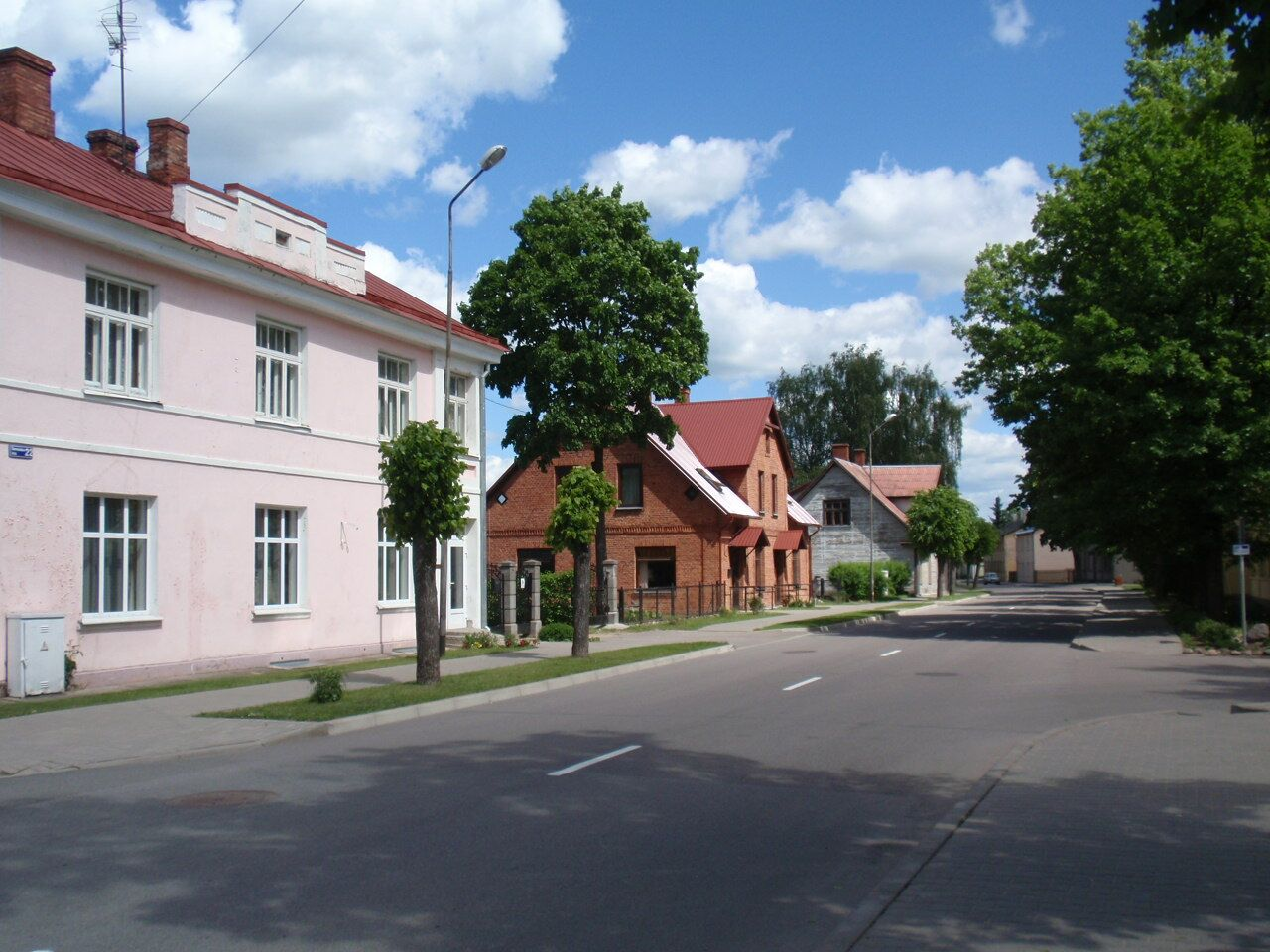
The town of Valka, Latvia

In Latvia, towns and cities are indiscriminately called pilsēta in singular form. The name is a contraction of two Latvian words: pils ('castle') and sēta ('fence'), making it very obvious what is meant by the word – what is situated between the castle and the castle fence. However, a city can be called lielpilsēta (big city) or mazpilsēta (small city/town) in reference to its size. Latvia also has administrative units such as state cities(valstspilsēta) A village is called ciemats or ciems in Latvian.

=== Lithuania ===
In Lithuanian, a city is called miestas and a town is called miestelis (literally 'small miestas'). Metropolises are called didmiestis (literally 'big miestas').

=== Malaysia ===
In Malaysia, a town (Malay: bandar or kota) is the area administered by a municipal council (Majlis Perbandaran).

=== New Zealand ===
In New Zealand, the term "town" has no current statutory meaning. Certain towns are regionally part of cities.

=== Netherlands ===
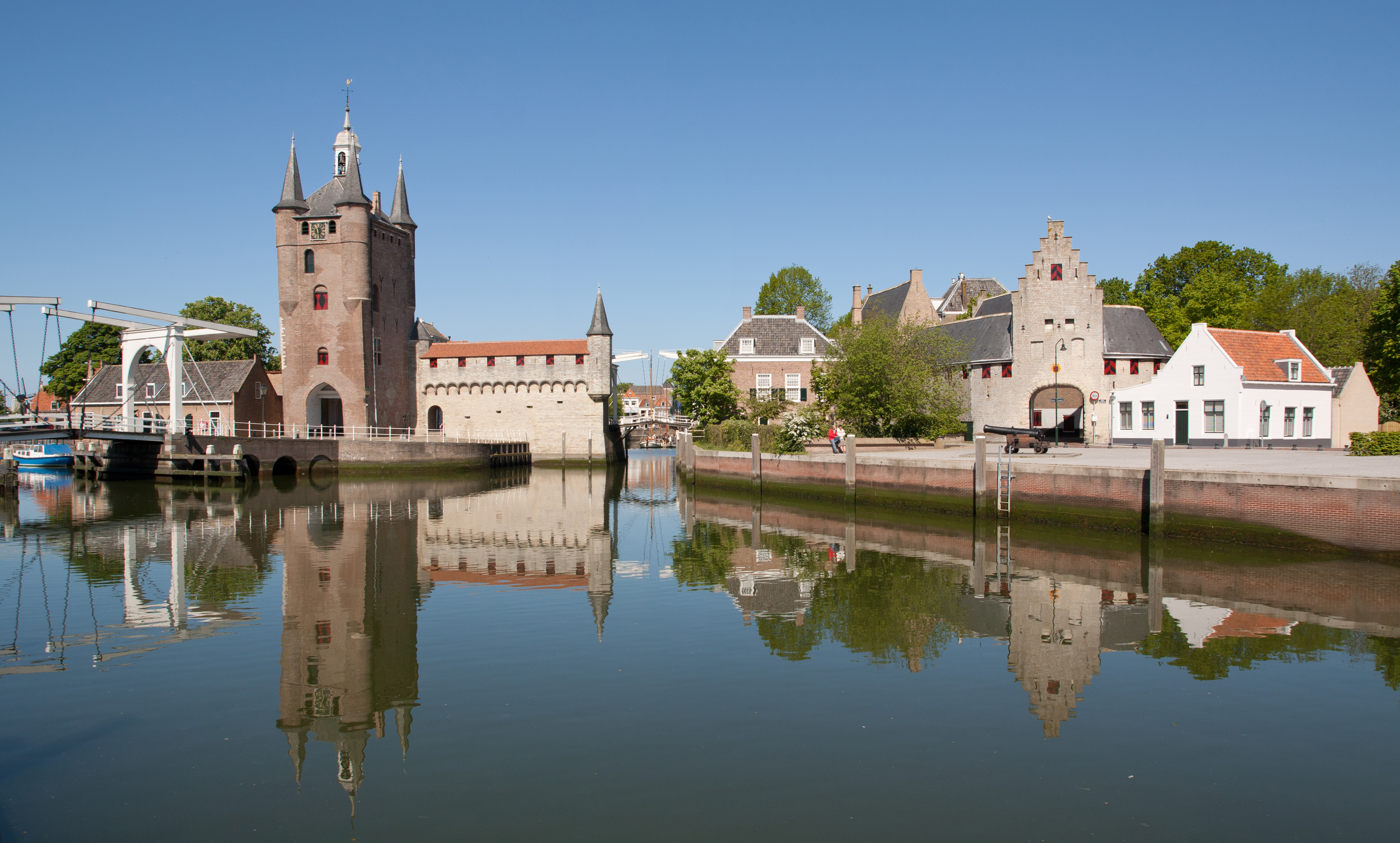
The small town of Zierikzee, Netherlands

Before 1848 there was a legal distinction between stad and non-stad parts of the country, but the word no longer has any legal significance. About 220 places were granted stadsrechten ('city rights') and are still so called for historical and traditional reasons, though the word is also used for large urban areas that never obtained such rights. Because of this, in the Netherlands, no distinction is made between city and town; both translate as stad. A hamlet (gehucht) usually has fewer than 1,000 inhabitants, a village (dorp) ranges from 1,000 up to 25,000 inhabitants, and a place above 25,000 can call itself either village or city, mostly depending on historic reasons or size of the place. As an example, The Hague never gained city rights, but because of its size – more than half a million inhabitants – it is regarded as a city. Staverden, with only 40 inhabitants, would be a hamlet, but because of its city rights it may call itself a city.

For statistical purposes, the Netherlands has three sorts of cities:

- kleine stad (small city): 50,000–99,999 inhabitants
- middelgrote stad (medium-sized city): 100,000–249,999 inhabitants
- grote stad (large city): 250,000 or more

Only Amsterdam, Rotterdam, The Hague and Utrecht are regarded as a grote stad.

=== Norway ===
In Norway, city and town both translate to by, even if a city may be referred to as storby ('large town'). They are all part of and administered as a kommune ('municipality').

Norway has had inland the northernmost city in the world: Hammerfest. Now the record is held by New Ålesund on the Norwegian island Svalbard.

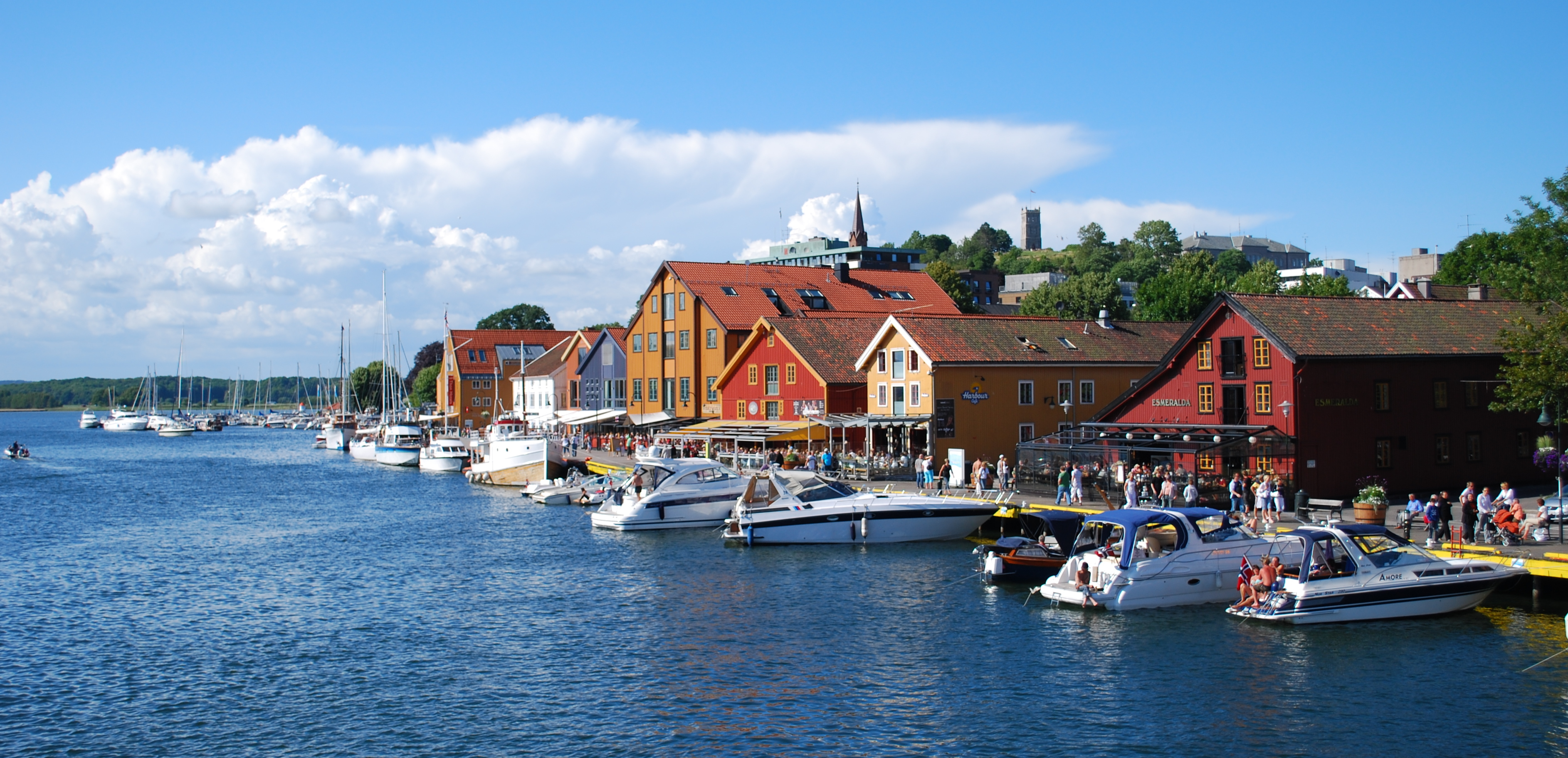
The oldest town in Norway is Tønsberg. Originally a market town, it is today a big city.

The oldest town in Norway is Tønsberg, founded during the Viking Age. The year when the town was founded and which person who founded it is unknown, but Snorri Sturluson says in the Saga of Harald Fairhair that the market town existed before the Battle of Hafrsfjord in the year 872. Nowadays Tønsberg is considered a city (storby).

=== Philippines ===
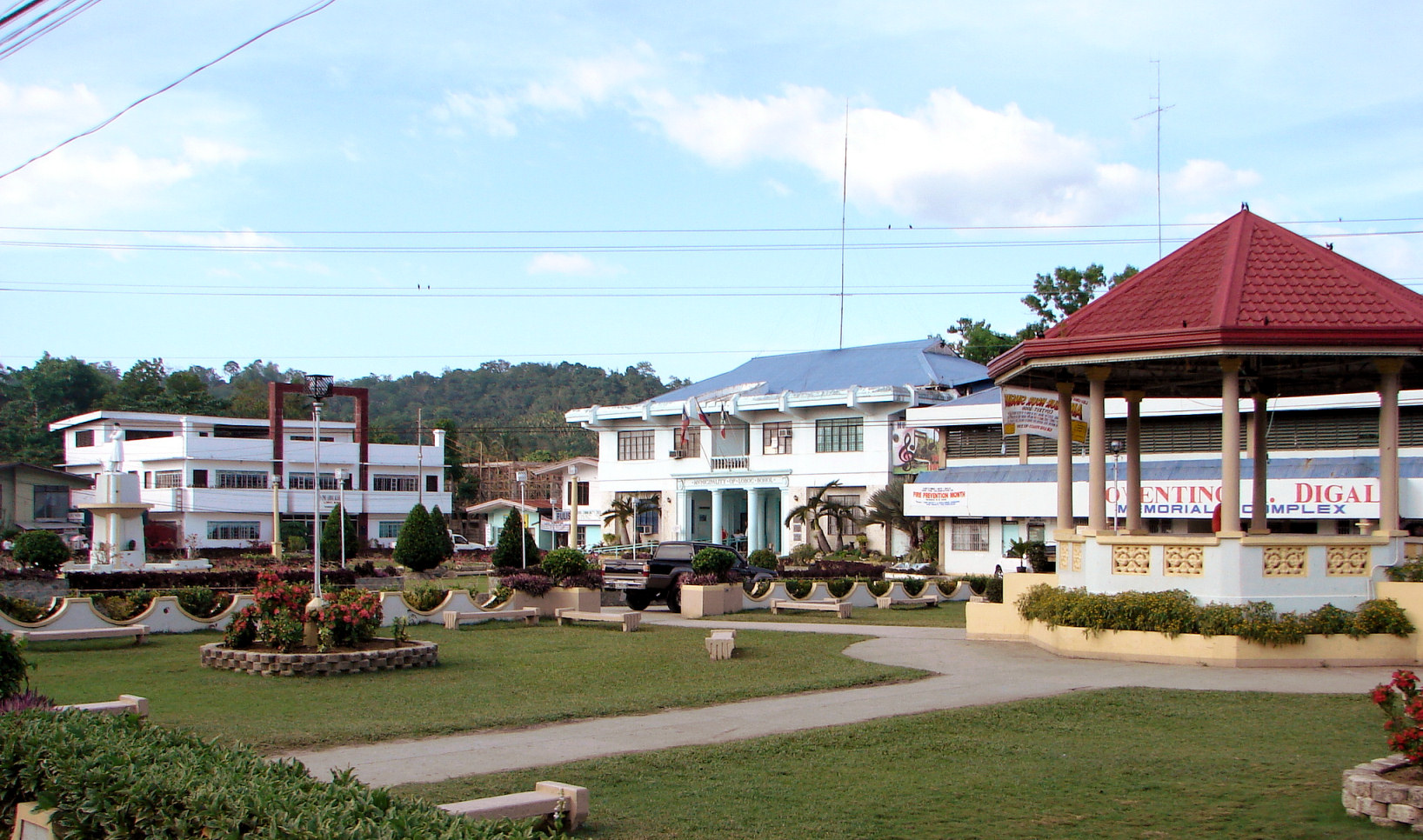
The town center of Loboc, Bohol

In the Philippines, the local official equivalent of the town is the municipality (Filipino: bayan). Every municipality, or town, in the country has a mayor (alkalde) and a vice mayor (bise alkalde) as well as local town officials (Sangguniang Bayan). Philippine towns, otherwise called municipalities, are composed of a number of villages and communities called barangays with one (or a few cluster of) barangay(s) serving as the town center or poblacion.

Unique in Philippine towns is that they have fixed budget, population and land requirements to become as such, i.e. from a barangay, or a cluster of such, to a town, or to become cities, i.e. from town to a city. Respectively, examples of these are the town of B. E. Dujali in Davao del Norte province, which was formed in 1998 from a cluster of five barangays, and the city of El Salvador, which was converted from a town to a city in 2007. Each town in the Philippines was classified by its annual income and budget.

A sharp, hierarchical distinction exists between Philippine cities (lungsod or siyudad) and towns, as towns in the country are juridically separate from cities, which are typically larger and more populous (some smaller and less populated) and which political and economic status are above those of towns. This was further supported and indicated by the income classification system implemented by the National Department of Finance, to which both cities and towns fell into their respective categories that indicate they are such as stated under Philippine law. However, both towns and cities equally share the status as local government units (LGUs) grouped under and belong to provinces and regions; both each are composed of barangays and are governed by a mayor and a vice mayor supplemented by their respective LGU legislative councils. However, despite this some towns in the Philippines are significantly larger than some cities in the Philippines such as Rodriguez, Rizal, Santa Maria, Bulacan and Minglanilla, Cebu are actually bigger than some regional centers.

=== Poland ===
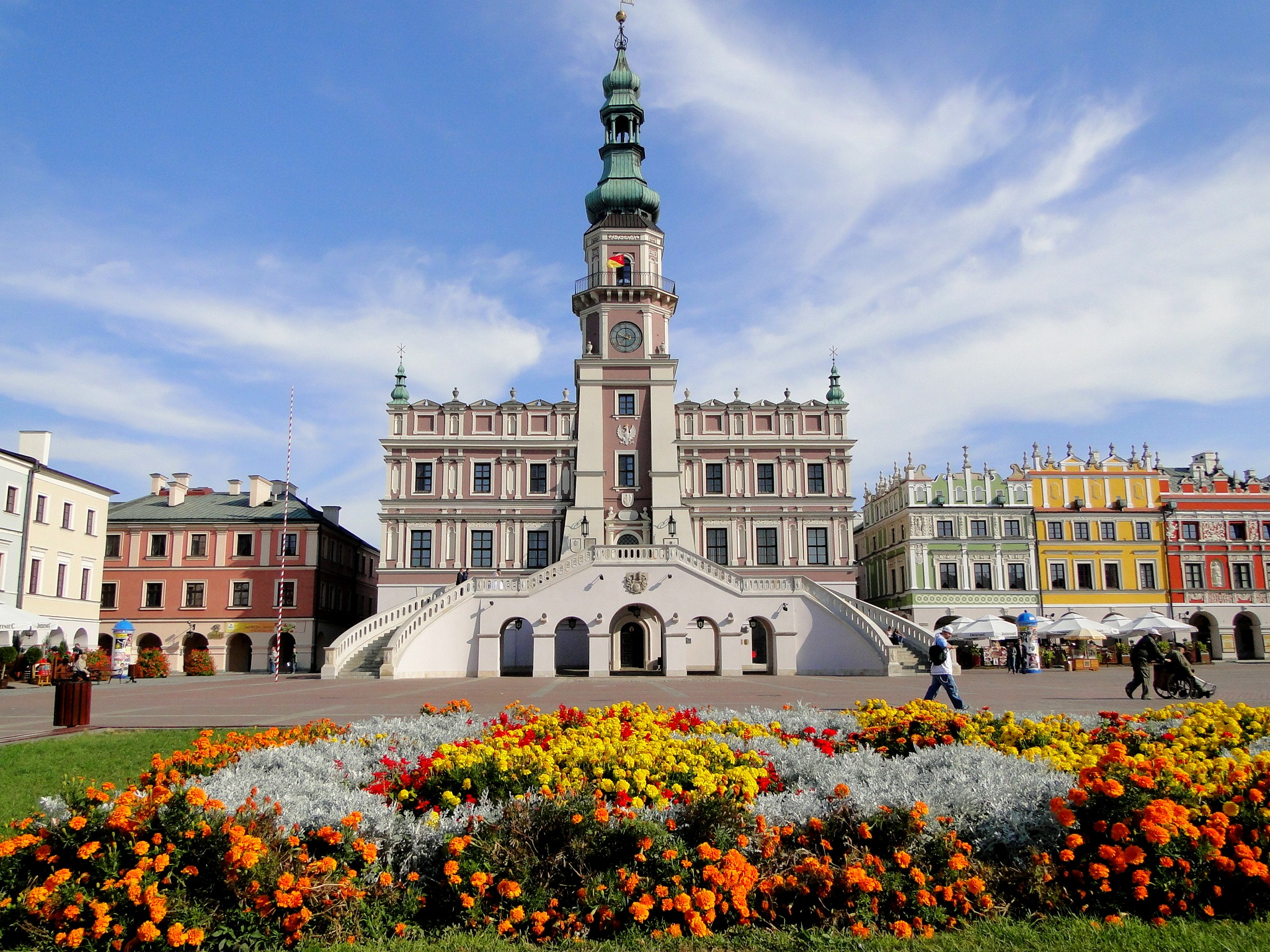
Zamość in Poland is an example of a utopian ideal town. It was declared a UNESCO World Heritage Site in 1992.

In the Polish language, there is no linguistic distinction between a city and a town, both translated miasto. The word for both is miasto, as a form of settlement distinct from types of rural settlements: village (wieś), przysiółek, osada, or kolonia, see Classification of localities and their parts in Poland. Cities are the biggest municipalities, distinguished through being managed by a city mayor (prezydent miasta, literally translated city president) instead of a town mayor (burmistrz) as the head of the city executive, thus being informally called miasto prezydenckie, with such privilege automatically awarded to municipalities either inhabited by more than 100,000 residents (currently 37) or those enjoying the status of a city with powiat rights (currently 66). As of 2022, all of the former group fit into the latter, though it was not always the case in the past. There is, however, a number of exemptions due to historic or political reasons, when a municipality meets neither of these two conditions but nevertheless has the city status, including the only 3 capitals of the former voivodeships of Poland (1975–1998) not meeting the abovementioned criteria, as well as further 38 municipalities which do not fit into any of the mentioned categories but have nevertheless been allowed to keep the earlier awarded status due to unspecified historical reasons. Towns may sometimes be called miasteczko, a diminutive colloquially used for localities with a few thousand residents. Such localities have a town mayor (burmistrz) as the head of the town executive.

Town/city rights are conferred by government legislation; new towns/cities are designated by the government in an annual regulation effective from the first day of the year. Some settlements tend to remain villages even though they have a larger population than many smaller towns, primarily in order not to lose eligibility for the European Agricultural Fund for Rural Development. As of 30 April 2022, there are altogether 2477 municipalities (gmina) in Poland, including 1513 rural gminas, while the remaining 968 ones contain cities and towns. Among them, 666 towns are part of an urban-rural gmina while 302 cities and towns are standalone as an urban gmina. The latter group includes 107 cities (governed by a prezydent miasta), including 66 cities with powiat rights. 37 cities among the latter group are over 100,000, including 18 cities serving as a seat for voivode or voivodeship sejmik, informally called voivodeship cities.

=== Portugal ===
Like other Latin cultures, in Portugal a town (vila) is a populated place larger than a village (aldeia and smaller than a city (cidade). Defined by law, a town must have:

- at least 3,000 voters
- at least half of these services: health unit, pharmacy, cultural centre, public transportation network, post office, commercial food and drinking establishments, primary school and/or bank office

In special cases, villages can receive the status of town if they possess historical, cultural or architectonic importance.

A town can be enterily located inside the area of a single freguesia (subdivion of a municipality) or can occupy several freguesias.

Portuguese local governments heraldry reflects if the seat of the respective freguesia or municipality is a city, town or another type of settlement. The coat of arms of a local government with a seat in a town bears a mural crown with four towers, while the coat of arms of a local government with a set in a city bears a crown with five towers.

This difference between towns and cities is still in use in other Portuguese-speaking countries. In Brazil, since the beginning of the 20th century, all municipal seats receive the status of city.

=== Romania ===
In Romania there is no official distinction between a city and a town (the word for both in Romanian is oraş). Cities and towns in Romania can have the status either of oraş municipiu, conferred to large urban areas, or only oraş to smaller urban localities. Some settlements remain villages (comune) even though they have a larger population than other smaller towns.

=== Russia ===
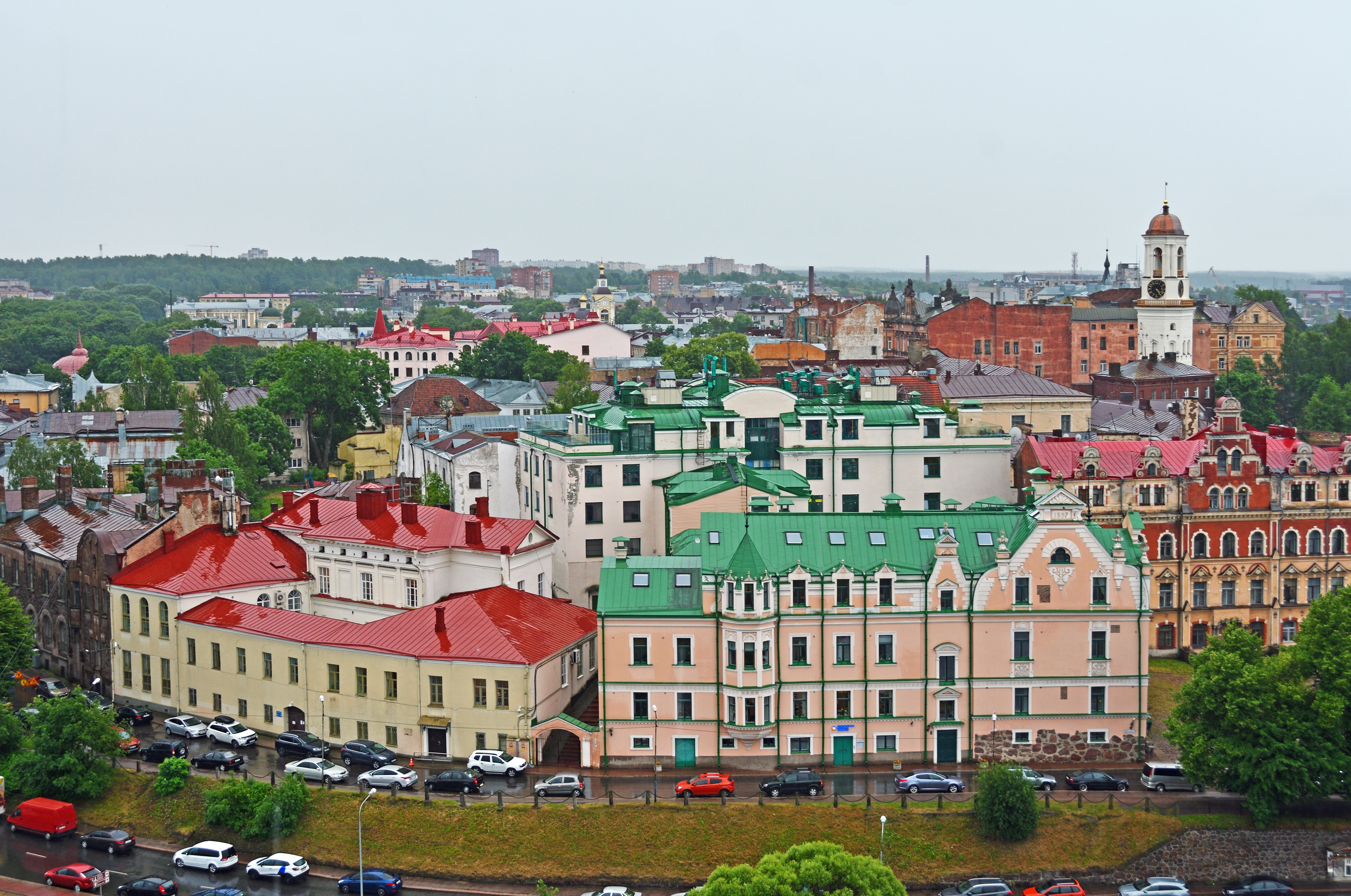
The town of Vyborg in Leningrad Oblast, Russia

Unlike English, the Russian language does not distinguish the terms city and town—both are translated as город (gorod). Occasionally the term город is applied to urban-type settlements as well, even though the status of those is not the same as that of a city/town proper.

In Russia, the criteria an inhabited locality needs to meet in order to be granted city/town (gorod) status vary in different federal subjects. In general, to qualify for this status, an inhabited locality should have more than 12,000 inhabitants and the occupation of no less than 85% of inhabitants must be other than agriculture. However, inhabited localities which were previously granted the city/town status but no longer meet the criteria can still retain the status for historical reasons.

=== Singapore ===
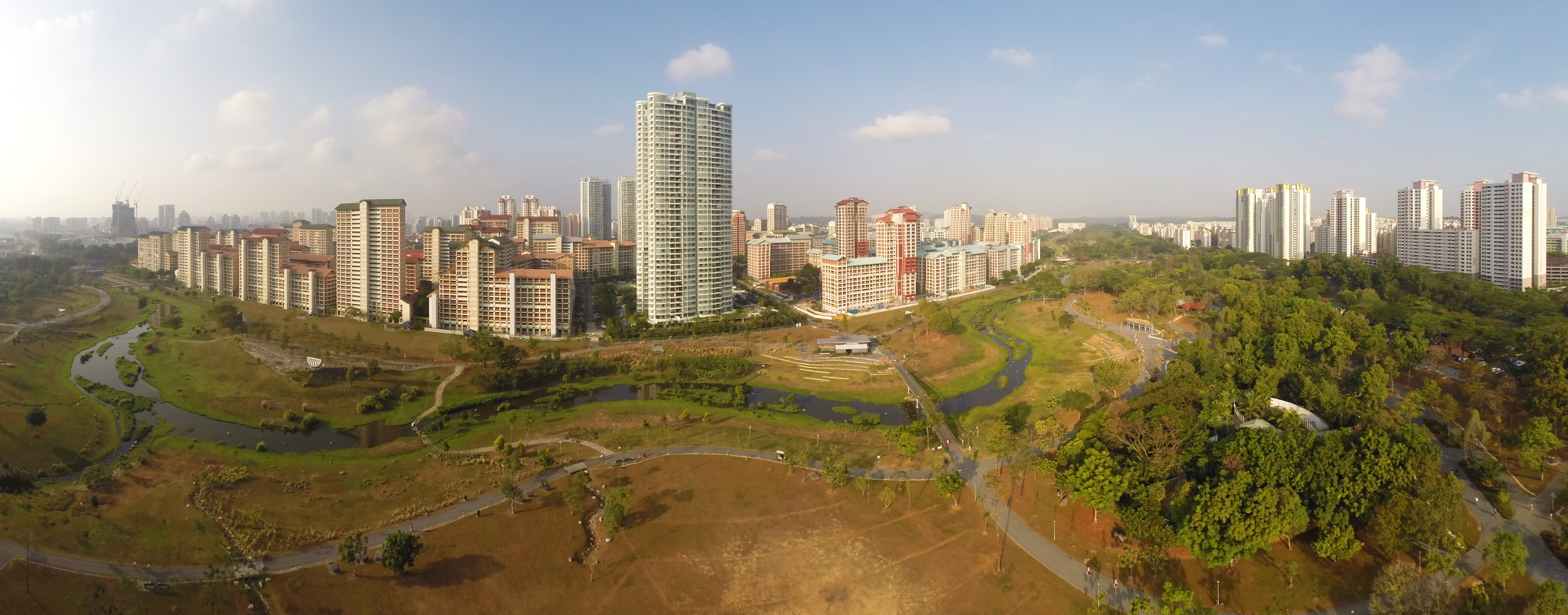
Bishan, one of Singapore's towns, is the 38th biggest in terms of geographical size and the 21st most populated planning area in the country.

In Singapore, towns are large-scale satellite housing developments which are designed to be self-contained. It includes public housing units, a town centre and other amenities. Helmed by a hierarchy of commercial developments, ranging from a town centre to precinct-level outlets, there is no need to venture out of town to meet the most common needs of residences. Employment can be found in industrial estates located within several towns. Educational, health care, and recreational needs are also taken care of with the provision of schools, hospitals, parks, sports complexes, and so on. The most populous town in the country is Bedok.

=== South Africa ===
In South Africa the Afrikaans term dorp is used interchangeably with the English equivalent town. A town is a settlement that has a size that is smaller than that of a city.

=== Spain ===
In Spain, the equivalent of town would be villa, a population unit between a village (pueblo) and a city (ciudad), and is not defined by the number of inhabitants, but by some historical rights and privileges dating from the Middle Ages, such as the right to hold a market or fair. For instance, while Madrid is technically a villa, Barcelona, with a smaller population, is known as a city.

=== Sweden ===
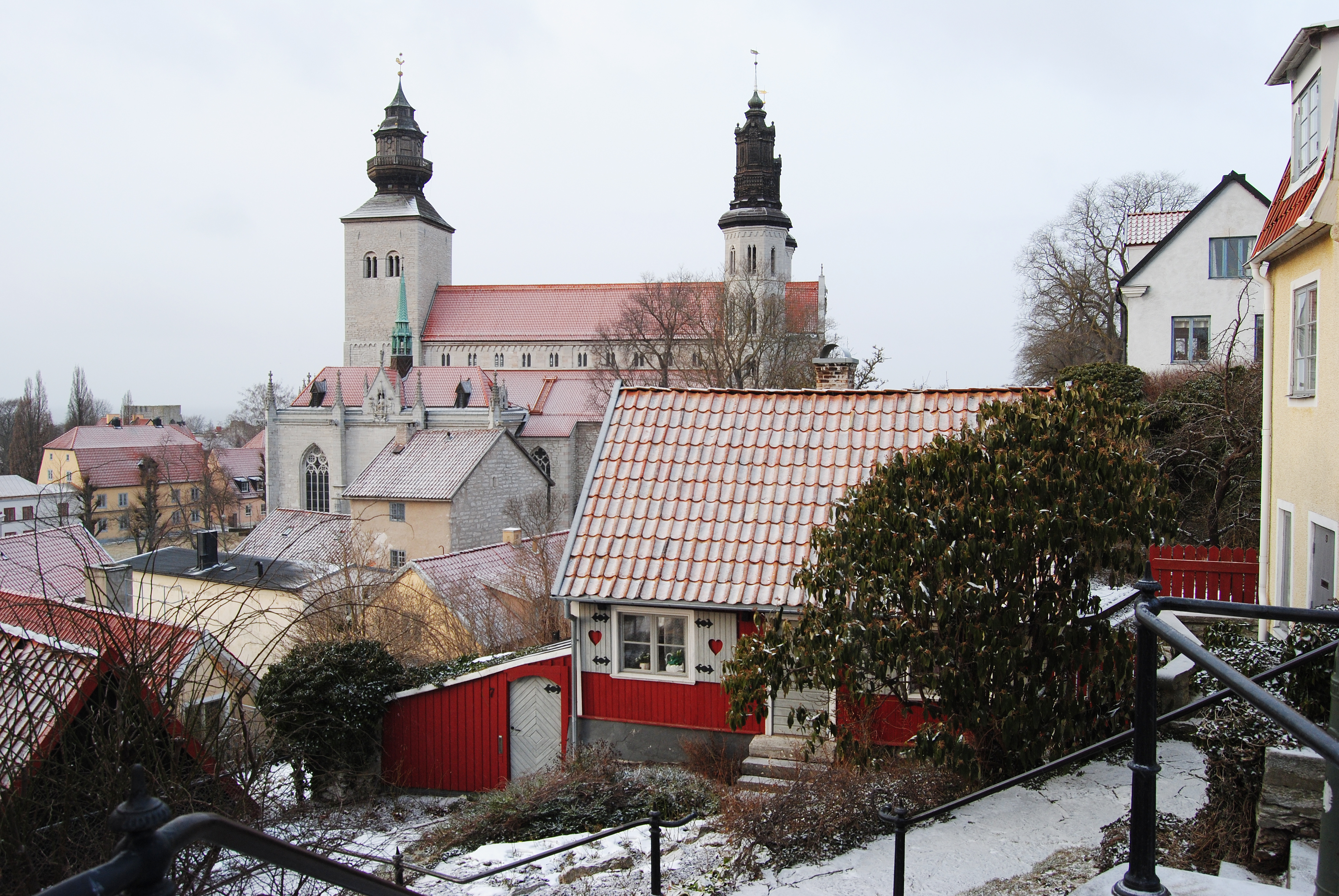
View towards St Mary's Cathedral in Visby, Sweden. Visby is one of the most well-preserved former Hanseatic cities in Sweden and a UNESCO World Heritage Site. Today it is the seat of Gotland Municipality.

The Swedish language does not differentiate between towns and cities in the English sense of the words; both words are commonly translated as stad, a term which has no legal significance today. The term tätort is used for an urban area or a locality, which however is a statistical rather than an administrative concept and encompasses densely settled villages with only 200 inhabitants as well as the major cities. The word köping corresponds to an English market town (chipping) or German Markt but is mainly of historical significance, as the term is not used today and only survives in some toponyms. Some towns with names ending in -köping are cities with over 100,000 inhabitants today, e.g. Linköping.

Before 1971, 132 larger municipalities in Sweden enjoyed special royal charters as stad instead of kommun (which is similar to a US county). However, since 1971 all municipalities are officially defined as kommun, thus making no legal difference between, for instance, Stockholm and a small countryside municipality. Every urban area that was a stad before 1971 is still often referred to as a stad in daily speech. Since the 1980s, 14 of these municipalities have branded themselves as stad again, although this has no legal or administrative significance, as they still have to refer to themselves as kommun in all legal documentation.

For statistical purposes, Statistics Sweden officially defines a stad as an urban area of at least 10,000 inhabitants. Since 2017 it also defines a storstad (literally 'big town') as a municipality with a population of at least 200,000 of which at least 200,000 are in its largest tätort. This means that Stockholm, Gothenburg and Malmö are storstäder, i.e. 'major cities', while Uppsala, with a population of approximately 230,000 in the municipality, which covers an unusually large area, almost three times larger than the combined land area of the municipalities of Stockholm, Gothenburg and Malmö, is not. The largest contiguous urban area within Uppsala municipality has a population of well below 200,000, while the population of both Malmö municipality, with a land area only 1/14 the size of Uppsala municipality, and Malmö tätort, i.e. contiguous urban area, is well over 300,000, and the population of the Malmö Metropolitan Area, with a land area only slightly larger than Uppsala Municipality, is well over 700,000. A difference in the size and population of the urban area between Uppsala and the smallest storstad in Sweden, Malmö, is the reason Statistics Sweden changed the definition of storstad in 2017.

=== Ukraine ===
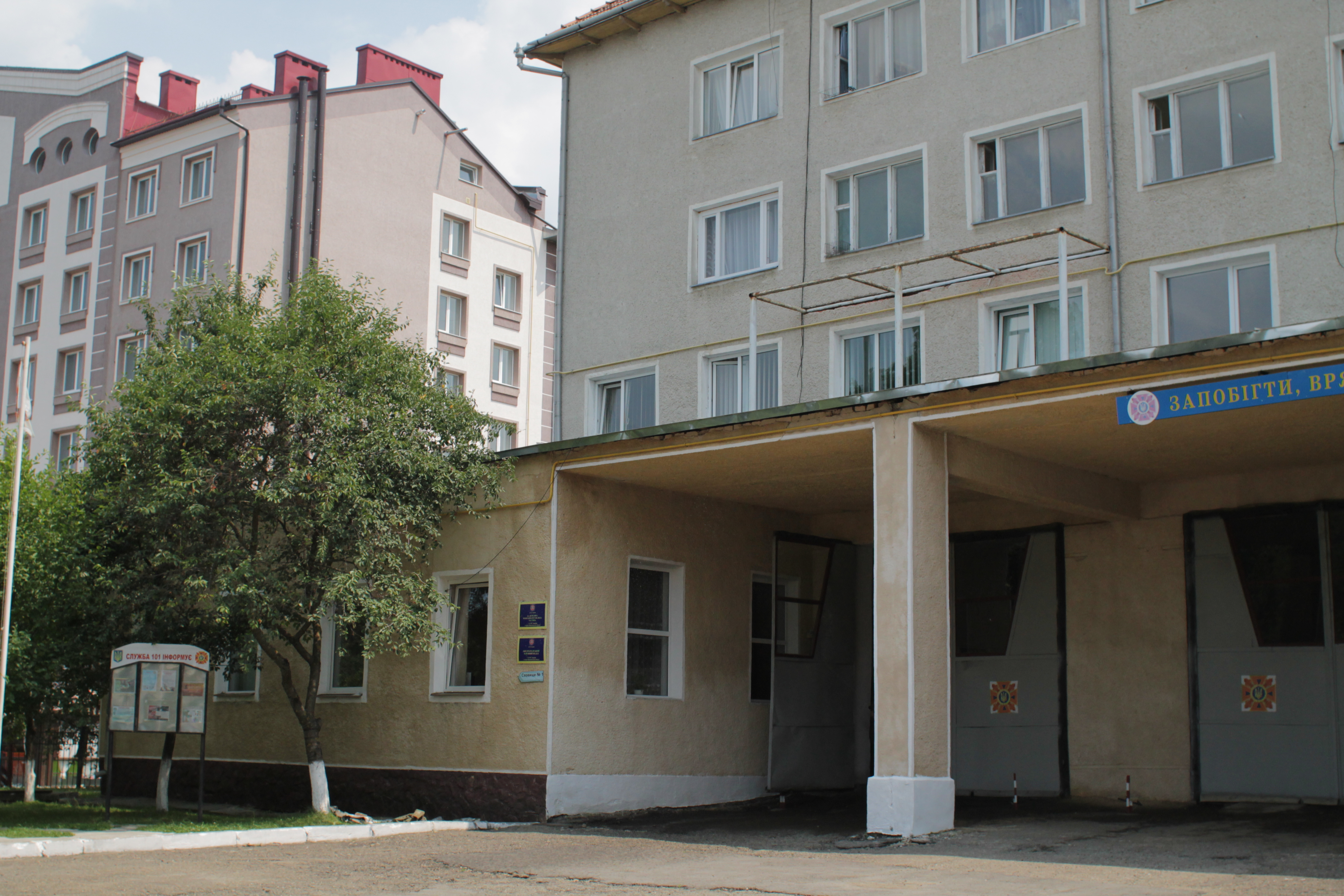
Fire station in town of Bohorodchany

In Ukraine the term town (містечко, mistechko) existed from the Medieval period until 1925, when it was replaced by the Soviet government with urban type settlement. Historically, a town in the Ukrainian lands was a smaller populated place that was chartered under the German town law and had a market square (see Market town).

=== United Kingdom ===
==== England and Wales ====
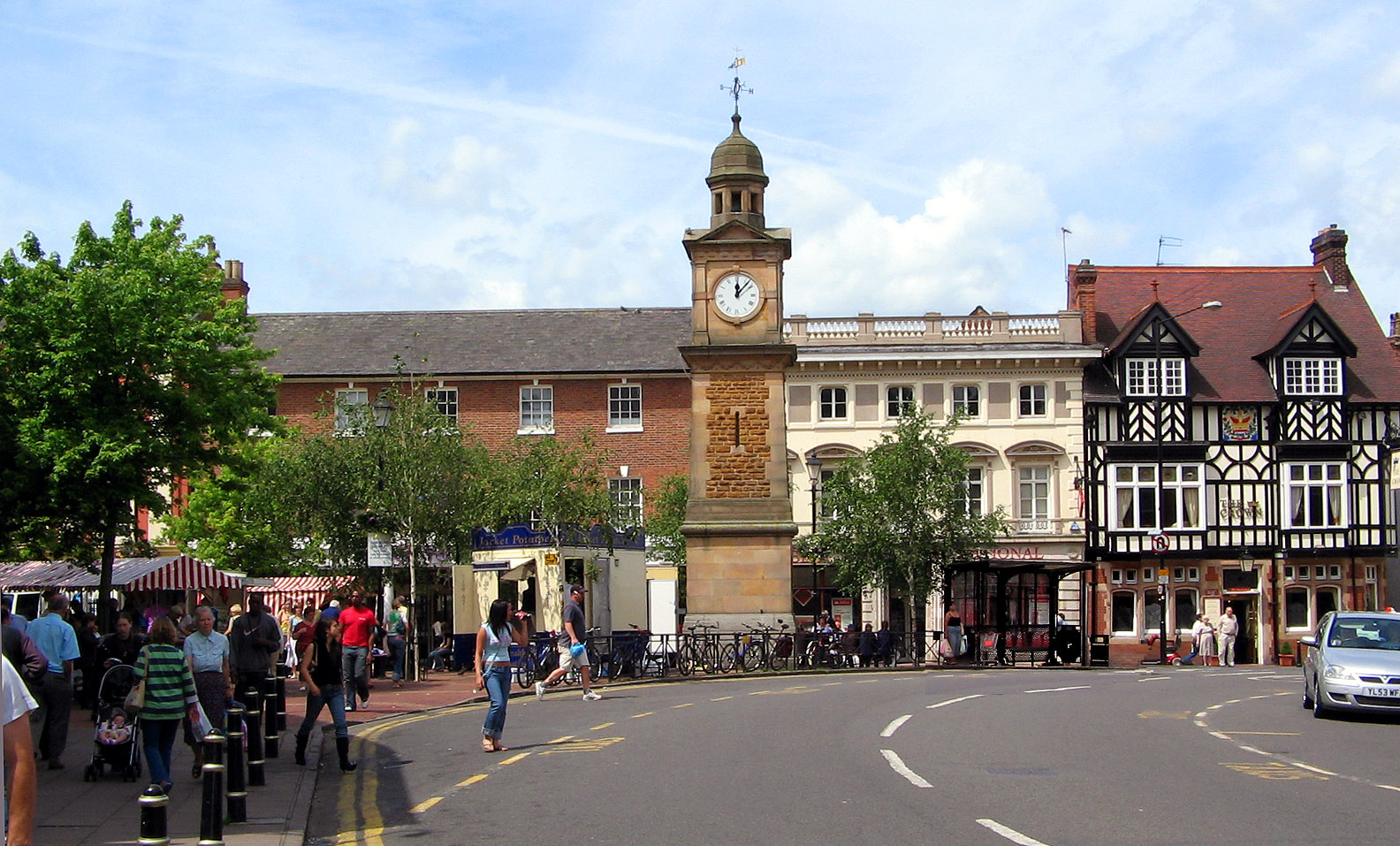
A traditional English town centre at Rugby

In England and Wales, a town traditionally was a settlement which had a charter to hold a market or fair and therefore became a "market town". Market towns were distinguished from villages in that they were the economic hub of a surrounding area, and were usually larger and had more facilities.

In parallel with popular usage, however, there are many technical and official definitions of what constitutes a town, to which various interested parties cling.

In modern official usage the term town is employed either for old market towns, or for settlements which have a town council, or for settlements which elsewhere would be classed a city, but which do not have the legal right to call themselves such. Any parish council can decide to describe itself as a town council, but this will usually only apply to the smallest "towns" (because larger towns will be larger than a single civil parish).

Not all settlements which are commonly described as towns have a town council or borough council. In fact, because of many successive changes to the structure of local government, there are now few large towns which are represented by a body closely related to their historic borough council. These days, a smaller town will usually be part of a local authority which covers several towns. And where a larger town is the seat of a local authority, the authority will usually cover a much wider area than the town itself (either a large rural hinterland, or several other, smaller towns).

Additionally, there are "new towns" which were created during the 20th century, such as Basildon, Redditch and Telford.

Some settlements which describe themselves as towns (e.g. Shipston-on-Stour, Warwickshire) are smaller than some large villages (e.g. Kidlington, Oxfordshire).

The status of a city is reserved for places that have letters patent entitling them to the name, historically associated with the possession of a cathedral. Some large municipalities (such as Northampton and Bournemouth) are legally boroughs but not cities, whereas some cities are quite small—such as Ely or St David's. The city of Brighton and Hove was created from the two former towns and some surrounding villages, and within the city the correct term for the former distinct entities is somewhat unclear.

Bishop's Stortford

It appears that a city may become a town, though perhaps only through administrative error: Rochester in Kent had been a city for centuries but, when in 1998 the Medway district was created, a bureaucratic blunder meant that Rochester lost its official city status and is now technically a town.

It is often thought that towns with bishops' seats rank automatically as cities: however, Chelmsford was a town until 5 June 2012 despite being the seat of the diocese of Chelmsford, created in 1914. St Asaph, which is the seat of the diocese of St Asaph, only became a city on 1 June 2012 though the diocese was founded in the mid-sixth century. In reality, the pre-qualification of having a cathedral of the established Church of England, and the formerly established Church in Wales or Church of Ireland, ceased to apply from 1888.

The word town can also be used as a general term for urban areas, including cities and in a few cases, districts within cities. In this usage, a city is a type of town; a large one, with a certain status. For example, central Greater London is sometimes referred to colloquially as "London town". (The "City of London" is the historical nucleus, informally known as the "Square Mile", and is administratively separate from the rest of Greater London, while the City of Westminster is also technically a city and is also a London borough.) Camden Town and Somers Town are districts of London, as New Town is a district of Edinburgh – actually the Georgian centre.

In recent years the division between cities and towns has grown, leading to the establishment of groups like the Centre for Towns, who work to highlight the issues facing many towns. Towns also became a significant issue in the 2020 Labour Party leadership election, with Lisa Nandy making significant reference to Labour needing to win back smaller towns which have swung away from the party.

==== Scotland ====
In Scotland the word town has no specific legal meaning and (especially in areas which were or are still Gaelic-speaking) can refer to a mere collection of buildings (e.g. a farm-town or in Scots ferm-toun), not all of which might be inhabited, or to an inhabited area of any size which is not otherwise described in terms such as city, burgh, etc. Many locations of greatly different size will be encountered with a name ending with -town, -ton, -toun etc. (or beginning with the Gaelic equivalent baile etc.).

"Burgh" (pronounced burruh) is the Scots term for a town or a municipality. They were highly autonomous units of local government from at least the 12th century until their abolition in 1975, when a new regional structure of local government was introduced across the country. Usually based upon a town, they had a municipal corporation and certain rights, such as a degree of self-governance and representation in the sovereign Parliament of Scotland adjourned in 1707.

The term no longer describes units of local government, although various claims are made from time to time that the legislation used was not competent to change the status of the Royal Burghs described below. The status is now chiefly ceremonial but various functions have been inherited by current councils (e.g. the application of various endowments providing for public benefit) which might only apply within the area previously served by a burgh; in consequence a burgh can still exist (if only as a defined geographical area) and might still be signed as such by the current local authority. The word 'burgh' is generally not used as a synonym for 'town' or 'city' in everyday speech, but is reserved mostly for government and administrative purposes.

Historically, the most important burghs were royal burghs, followed by burghs of regality and burghs of barony. Some newer settlements were only designated as police burghs from the 19th century onward, a classification which also applies to most of the older burghs.

=== United States ===
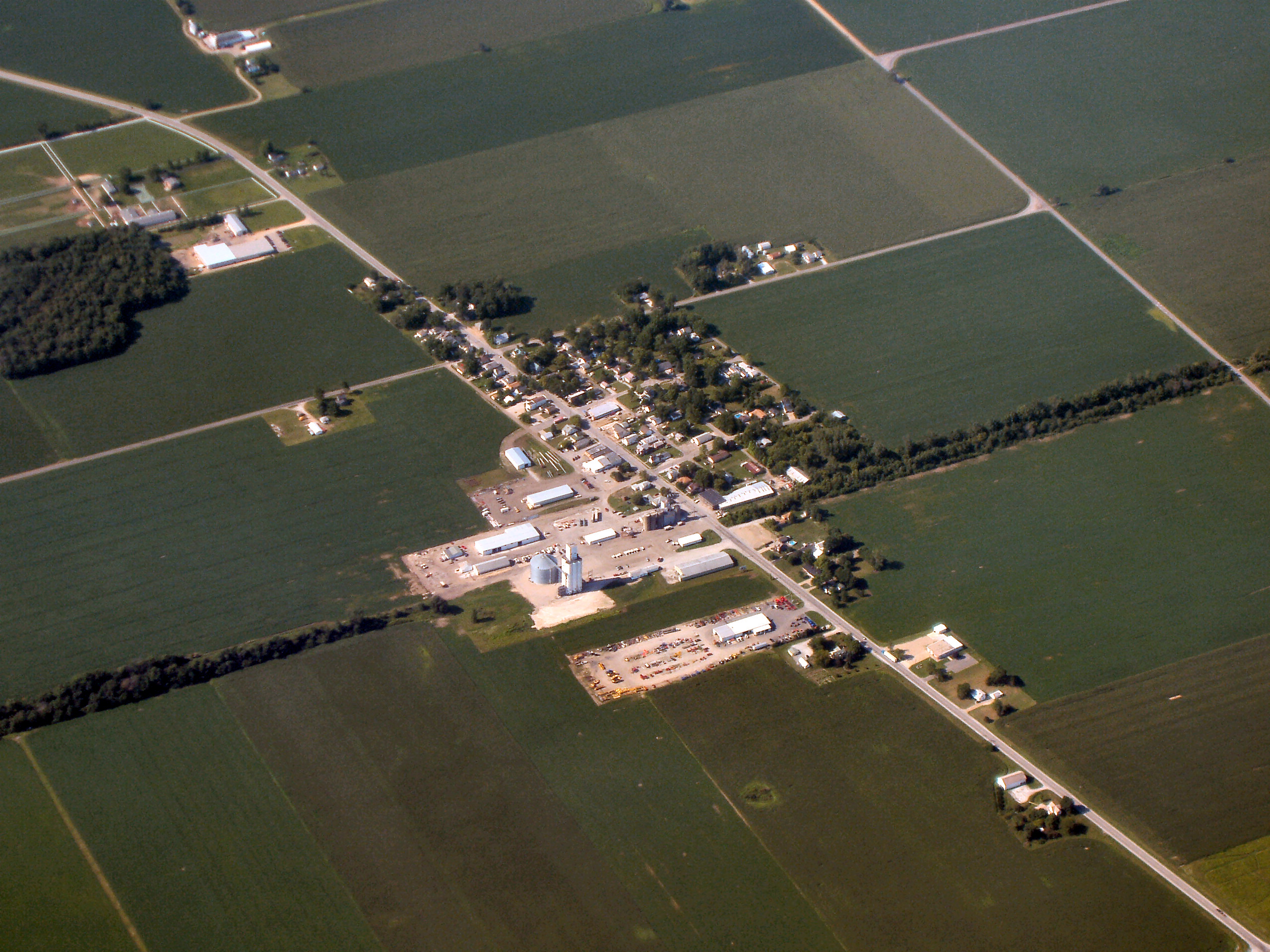
The tiny farming community of Wyatt, Indiana

In the United States, the meaning of the term town is different in each state. In some states, a town is a town if the state says it is. In other states, like Wisconsin, a town is a subdivision of a county. In other states, like Michigan, the name "town" has no official meaning. People use it to describe any place where many people live. In the six New England states, a town is a kind of municipality that is like a city, but smaller. For example, in Pennsylvania, a town is a specific type of incorporated municipality, distinct from townships and boroughs, with only one town, Bloomsburg, officially designated as such under state law. They're originally based around a population center and in most cases correspond to the geographical designations used by the United States Census Bureau for reporting of housing and population statistics. Municipalities vary greatly in size, from the millions of residents of New York City and Los Angeles to the few hundred people who live in Jenkins, Minnesota. In some instances, the term town refers to a small incorporated municipality of less than a population threshold specified by state statute, while in others a town can be significantly larger. Some states do not use the term town at all, while in others the term has no official meaning and is used informally to refer to a populated place, of any size, whether incorporated or unincorporated. In some other states, the words town and city are legally interchangeable. The Census of Governments treats jurisdictions called towns in the New England states, Minnesota, New York, and Wisconsin as townships rather than municipalities.

Small-town life has been a major theme in American literature, especially stories of rejection by young people leaving for the metropolis.

Since the use of the term varies considerably by state, individual usages are presented in the following sections:

==== Alabama ====
In Alabama, the legal use of the terms town and city is based on population. A municipality with a population of 2,000 or more is a city, while less than 2,000 is a town (Code of Alabama 1975, Section 11-40-6). For legislative purposes, municipalities are divided into eight classes based on population. Class 8 includes all towns, plus cities with populations of less than 6,000 (Code of Alabama 1975, Section 11-40-12).

==== Arizona ====
In Arizona, the terms town and city are largely interchangeable. A community may incorporate under either a town or a city organization with no regard to population or other restrictions according to Arizona law (see Arizona Revised Statutes, Title 9). Cities may function under slightly differing governmental systems, such as the option to organize a district system for city governments, but largely retain the same powers as towns. Arizona law also allows for the consolidation of neighboring towns and the unification of a city and a town, but makes no provision for the joining of two adjacent cities.

==== California ====
In California, the words town and city are synonymous by law (see Cal. Govt. Code §§ 34500–34504). There are two types of cities in California: charter and general law. Cities organized as charter cities derive their authority from a charter that they draft and file with the state, and which, among other things, states the municipality's name as "City of (Name)" or "Town of (Name)." Government Code §§ 34500–34504 apply to cities organized as general law cities, which differ from charter cities in that they do not have charters but instead operate with the powers conferred them by the pertinent sections of the Government Code. Like charter cities, general law cities may incorporate as "City of (Name)" or "Town of (Name)."

Some cities change what they are referred to as. The sign in front of the municipal offices in Los Gatos, California, for example, reads "City of Los Gatos", but the words engraved on the building above the front entrance when the city hall was built read "Town of Los Gatos." There are also signs at the municipal corporation limit, some of which welcome visitors to the "City of Los Gatos" while older, adjacent signs welcome people to the "Town of Los Gatos." Meanwhile, the village does not exist in California as a municipal corporation. Instead, the word town is commonly used to indicate any unincorporated community that might otherwise be known as an unincorporated village. Additionally, some people may still use the word town as shorthand for township, which is not an incorporated municipality but an administrative division of a county.

==== Georgia ====
Georgia is divided into 159 counties and contains 535 municipalities consisting of cities, towns, consolidated city-counties, and consolidated cities. There is no legal difference in Georgia between cities and towns.

==== Hawaii ====
In Hawaii, the Department of Business, Economic Development, and Tourism has the statutory authority to establish, modify, or abolish the statistical boundaries for cities, town, and. villages. However, the only municipal government in Hawaii is the City and County of Honolulu.

==== Illinois ====
In Illinois, the word town has been used both to denote a subdivision of a county called a township, and to denote a form of municipality similar to a village, in that it is generally governed by a president and trustees rather than a mayor. In some areas a town may be incorporated legally as a village (meaning it has at large trustees) or a city (meaning it has aldermen from districts) and absorb the duties of the township it is coterminous with (maintenance of birth records, certain welfare items). Evanston, Berwyn and Cicero are examples of towns in this manner. Under the current Illinois Municipal Code, an incorporated or unincorporated town may choose to incorporate as a city or as a village, but other forms of incorporation are no longer allowed.

==== Indiana ====
In Indiana, a town is differentiated from a city in that a town can not become a city until it has a population of at least 2,000. The form of government is also different from that of a city in that the town council is both the legislative and executive branches of government. The mayor is selected by the council from within its ranks and operates as a first among equals.

==== Louisiana ====
In Louisiana, a town is defined as being a municipal government having a population of 1,001 to 4,999 inhabitants.

==== Maryland ====
While a town is generally considered a smaller entity than a city, the two terms are legally interchangeable in Maryland. The only exception is the independent city of Baltimore, which is a special case, as it was created by the Constitution of Maryland.

==== Mississippi ====
Municipalities in Mississippi are classified according to population size. At time of incorporation, municipalities with populations of more than 2,000 are classified as cities, municipalities containing between 301 and 2000 persons are classified as towns, and municipalities between 100 and 300 persons are classified as villages. Places may be incorporated to become a city, town, or village through a petition signed by two-thirds of the qualified voters who reside in the proposed municipality. The major function of municipal governments are to provide services for its citizens such as maintaining roads and bridges, providing law, fire protection, and health and sanitation services.

==== Nevada ====
In Nevada, a town has a form of government, but is not considered to be incorporated. It generally provides a limited range of services, such as Land-use planning and recreation, while leaving most services to the county. Many communities have found this "semi-incorporated" status attractive; the state has only 20 incorporated cities, and towns as large as Paradise (186,020 in 2000 Census), home of the Las Vegas Strip. Most county seats are also towns, not cities.

==== New England ====
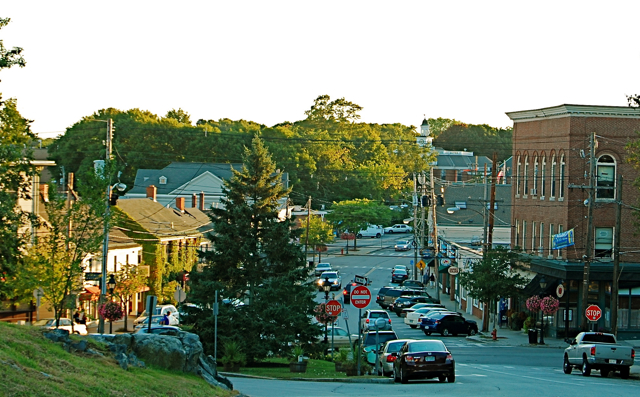
A downtown of Ipswich, Massachusetts

In the six New England states, a town is the most prevalent minor civil division, and in most cases, are a more important form of government than the county. In Connecticut, Rhode Island and seven out of fourteen counties in Massachusetts, in fact, counties only exist as boundaries for state services and chambers of commerce at most, and have no independent legal functions. In New Hampshire, Maine, and Vermont, counties function at a limited scope, and are still not as important in northern New England as they are outside of the northeast. In all six states, towns perform functions that in most states would be county functions. The defining feature of a New England town, as opposed to a city, is that a town meeting and a board of selectmen serve as the main form of government for a town, while cities are run by a mayor and a city council. For example, Brookline, Massachusetts is a town, even though it is fairly urban, because of its form of government. In the three southern New England states, the entire land area is divided into towns and cities, while the three northern states have small areas that are unincorporated. In Vermont and New Hampshire, the population of these areas is practically nonexistent, while in Maine, unincorporated areas make up roughly half of the state's area but only one percent of the state's population.

Though the U.S. Census Bureau defines New England towns as "minor civil divisions" for statistical purposes, all New England towns are municipal corporations equivalent to cities in all legal respects, except for form of government. For statistical purposes, the Census Bureau uses census-designated places for the built-up population centers within towns, though these have no legal or social recognition for residents of those towns. Similarly, the Census Bureau uses a special designation for urban areas within New England, the New England city and town area, instead of the metropolitan statistical area it uses in the rest of the country.

==== New Jersey ====
A town in the context of New Jersey local government refers to one of five types and one of eleven forms of municipal government. While town is often used as a shorthand to refer to a township, the two are not the same. The Town Act of 1895 allowed any municipality or area with a population exceeding 5,000 to become a Town through a petition and referendum process. Under the 1895 Act, a newly incorporated town was divided into at least three wards, with two councilmen per ward serving staggered two-year terms, and one councilman at large, who also served a two-year term. The councilman at large served as chairman of the town council. The Town Act of 1988 completely revised the town form of government and applied to all towns incorporated under the Town Act of 1895 and to those incorporated by a special charter granted by the Legislature prior to 1875.

Under the 1988 Act, the mayor is also the councilman at large, serving a term of two years, unless increased to three years by a petition and referendum process. The council under the Town Act of 1988 consists of eight members serving staggered two-year terms with two elected from each of four wards. One council member from each ward is up for election each year. Towns with different structures predating the 1988 Act may retain those features unless changed by a petition and referendum process. Two new provisions were added in 1991 to the statutes governing towns. First, a petition and referendum process was created whereby the voters can require that the mayor and town council be elected to four-year terms of office. The second new provision defines the election procedure in towns with wards. The mayor in a town chairs the town council and heads the municipal government. The mayor may both vote on legislation before council and veto ordinances. A veto may be overridden by a vote of two-thirds of all the members of the council. The council may enact an ordinance to delegate all or a portion of the executive responsibilities of the town to a municipal administrator. Fifteen New Jersey municipalities currently have a type of town, nine of which operate under the town form of government.

==== New York ====
In New York, a town is a division of the county that possesses home rule powers, but generally with fewer functions than towns in New England. A town provides a closer level of governance than its enclosing county, providing almost all municipal services to unincorporated communities, called hamlets, and selected services to incorporated areas, called villages. In New York, a town typically contains a number of such hamlets and villages. However, due to their independent nature, incorporated villages may exist in two towns or even two counties (example: Almond (village), New York). Everyone in New York who does not live in a city or Indian reservation lives in a town and possibly in one of the town's hamlets or villages. New York City and Geneva are the only two cities that span county boundaries. The only part of Geneva in Seneca County is water; each of the boroughs of New York City is a county.

==== North Carolina ====
In North Carolina, all cities, towns, and villages are incorporated as municipalities. According to the North Carolina League of Municipalities, there is no legal distinction among a city, town, or village—it is a matter of preference of the local government. Some North Carolina cities have populations as small as 1,000 residents, while some towns, such as Cary, have populations of greater than 100,000.

==== Oklahoma ====
In Oklahoma, according to the state's municipal code, city means a municipality which has incorporated as a city in accordance with the laws of the state, whereas town means a municipality which has incorporated as a town in accordance with the laws of the state, and municipality means any incorporated city or town. The term village is not defined or used in the act. Any community of people residing in compact form may become incorporated as a town; however, if the resident population is one thousand or more, a town or community of people residing in compact form may become incorporated as a city.

==== Pennsylvania ====
In Pennsylvania, the incorporated divisions are townships, boroughs, and cities, of which boroughs are equivalent to towns (example: State College is a borough). However, one borough is incorporated as a town: Bloomsburg.

==== South Carolina ====
At incorporation, municipalities may choose to be named either "City of" or "Town of", however there is no legal difference between the two. All municipalities are responsible for providing local service including law enforcement, fire protection, waste and water management, planning and zoning, recreational facilities, and street lighting. Municipalities may incorporate with one of three forms of government: 141 chose mayor–council, 95 chose council, and 33 chose council–manager.

==== Tennessee ====
Some Tennessee municipalities are called "cities" and others are called "towns." These terms do not have legal significance in Tennessee and are not related to population, date of establishment, or type of municipal charter.

==== Texas ====
In Texas, although some municipalities refer to themselves as "towns" or "villages" (to market themselves as an attractive place to live), these names have no specific designation in Texas law; legally all incorporated places are considered cities.

==== Utah ====
In Utah, the legal use of the terms town and city is based on population. A municipality with a population of 1,000 or more is a city, while less than 1,000 is a town. In addition, cities are divided into five separate classes based on the population.

==== Virginia ====
In Virginia, a town is an incorporated municipality similar to a city (though with a smaller required minimum population). But while cities are by Virginia law independent of counties, towns are contained within counties.

==== Washington ====
A town in the state of Washington is a municipality that has a population of less than 1,500 at incorporation, however an existing town can reorganize as a code city. Town government authority is limited relative to cities, the other main classification of municipalities in the state. As of 2012, most municipalities in Washington are cities (see: List of towns in Washington).

==== Wisconsin ====
Wisconsin has towns which are areas outside of incorporated cities and villages. These towns retain the name of the civil township from which they evolved and are often the same name as a neighboring city. Some towns, especially those in urban areas, have services similar to those of incorporated cities, such as police departments. These towns will, from time to time, incorporate into cities, such as Fox Crossing in 2016 from the former town of Menasha. Often this is to avoid annexation into neighboring cities and villages.

==== Wyoming ====
A Wyoming statute indicates towns are incorporated municipalities with populations of less than 4,000. Municipalities of 4,000 or more residents are considered "first-class cities". Some examples are Moorcroft, Wyoming and Sundance, Wyoming.

=== Vietnam ===
In Vietnam, a district-level town (Vietnamese: thị xã) is the second subdivision, below a province (tỉnh) or municipality (thành phố trực thuộc trung ương). A commune-level town (thị trấn) a third-level (commune-level) subdivision, below a district (huyện).

== See also ==
- Commuter town
- Company town
- Developed environments
- Fire sign (address)
- Lists of towns
- Location
- Megalopolis
- Proto-city
- Town charter
- Town hall
- Town limits
- Town privileges
- Town square

== Sources ==
- Room, Adrian (1996). An Alphabetical Guide to the Language of Name Studies. Lanham and London: The Scarecrow Press. ISBN 978-0-8108-3169-8.
