= Breaking bulk =

Break bulk or breaking bulk may refer to:

- Breakbulk cargo, a shipping term for any loose material that must be loaded individually, and not in Intermodal containers nor in bulk as with oil or grain
- Breaking bulk (law), a legal term for taking anything out of a package or parcel or in any way destroying its entirety
