= Fire sign (address) =

Roadside sign showing a place's address

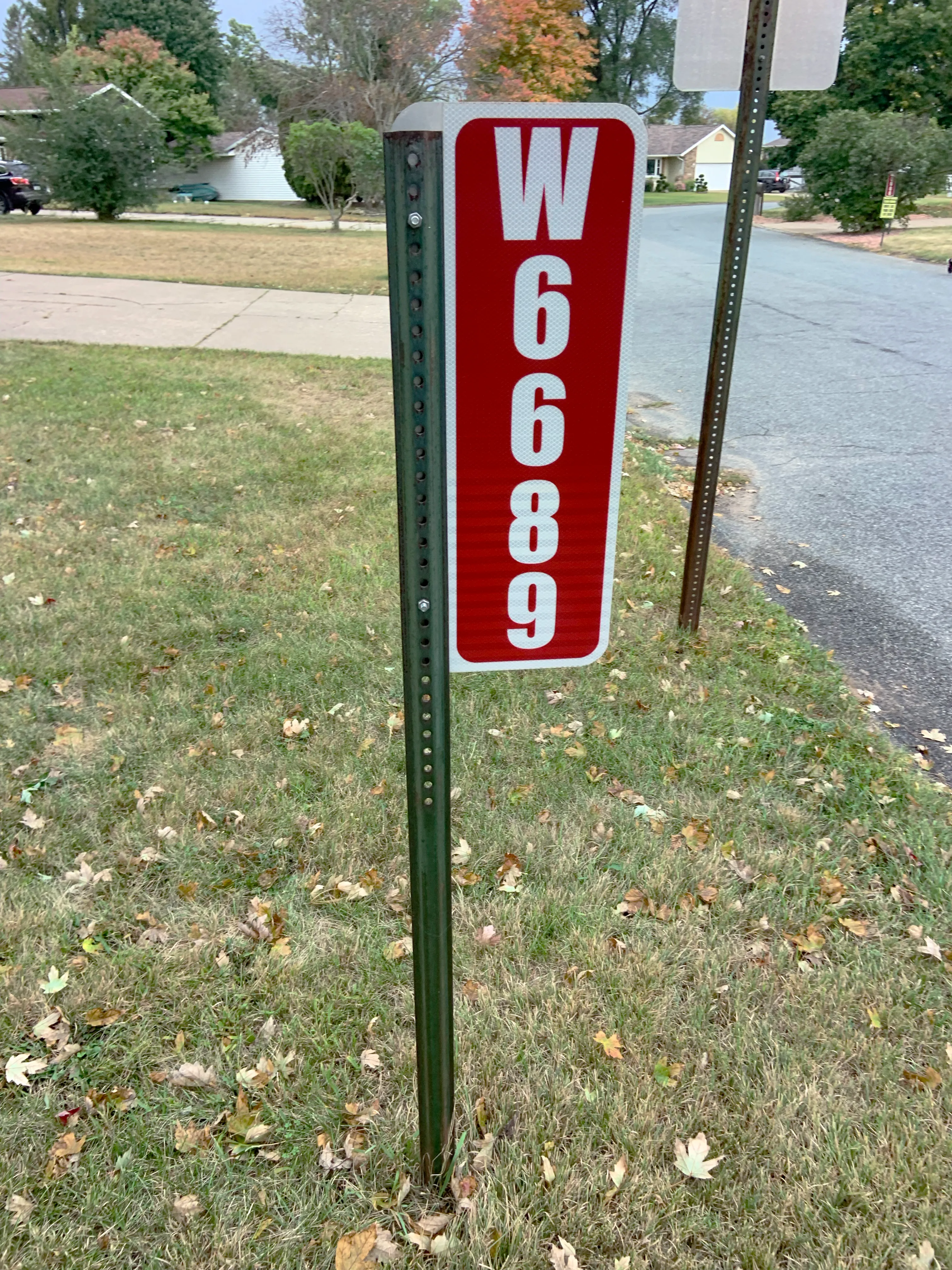
Dual-sided fire sign address with vertical lettering

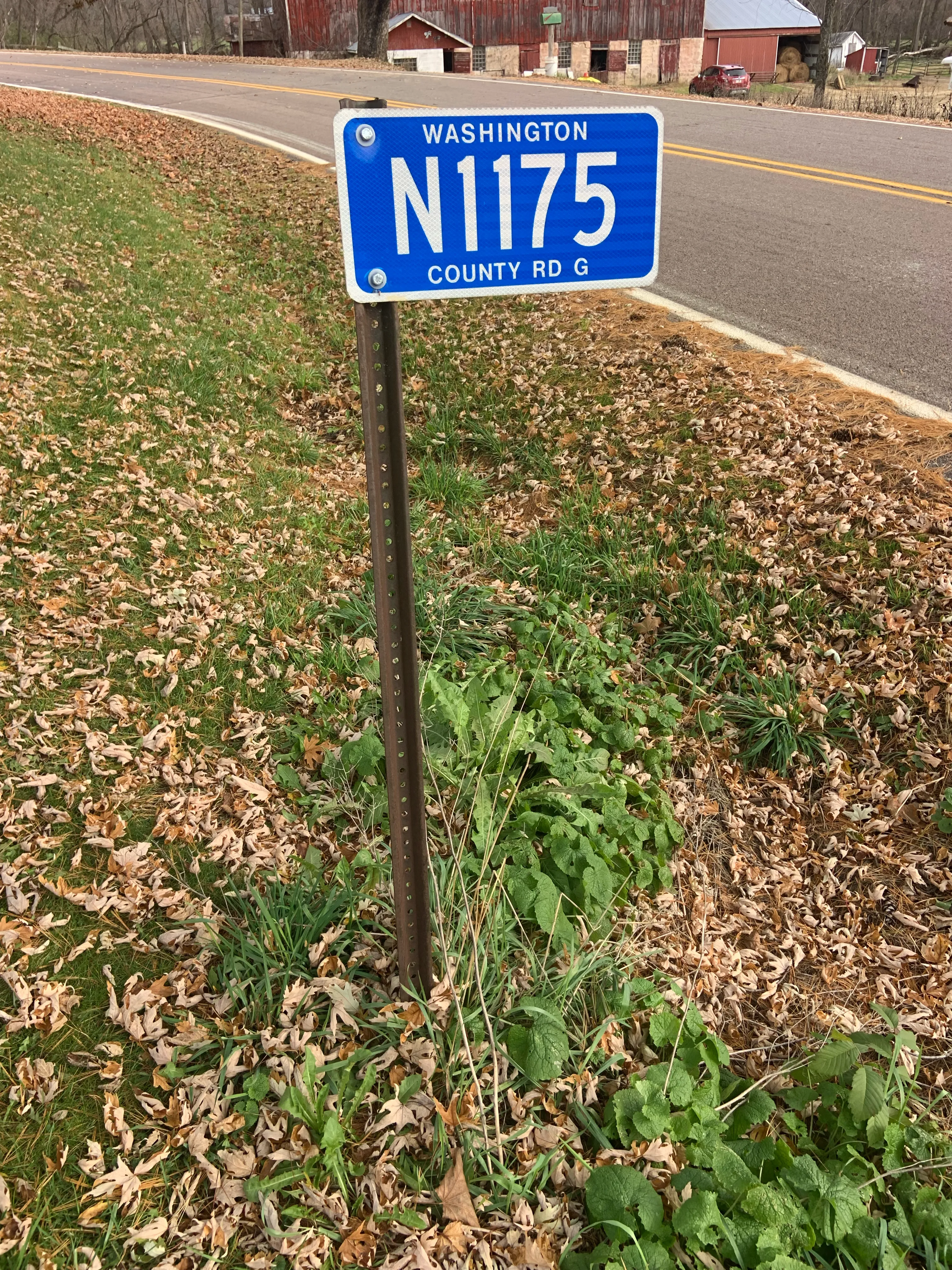
Dual-sided fire sign address with town and road name

A fire sign is an address sign or similar placard placed in some rural areas where driveways connect to roads. They are usually bolted on to steel fence posts that are driven into the ground. Each town or county sets the standard as to how the address sign shall look, such as vertical or horizontal numbers and letters, dual- or single-sided, town/community name or road displayed.

Well placed visible signs are essential to help people find specific locations in a timely manner as well as emergency services such as police, fire department, or ambulance and also delivery workers such as United States Postal Service, UPS, FedEx, and more.

== See also ==
- Postal system
- Parcel delivery
- License plate
