= Pilferage =

Pilferage or pilfering is the act of stealing items of low value, especially in small quantities, also called petty theft.

Pilferage may also refer to:

- Package pilferage, the theft of part of the contents of a package
- Pilferage (animal behavior), when one animal takes food from another animal's larder

== See also ==
- Theft
