= JNE =

JNE may refer to:

- Jalur Nugraha Ekakurir, an Indonesian courier company
- Journal of Negro Education
- Journal of Nursing Education, a monthly peer-reviewed nursing journal
- National Jury of Elections (Jurado Nacional de Elecciones), a constitutional organism located in Peru
