= JNE Express =

Indonesian package delivery company

PT Tiki Jalur Nugraha Ekakurir
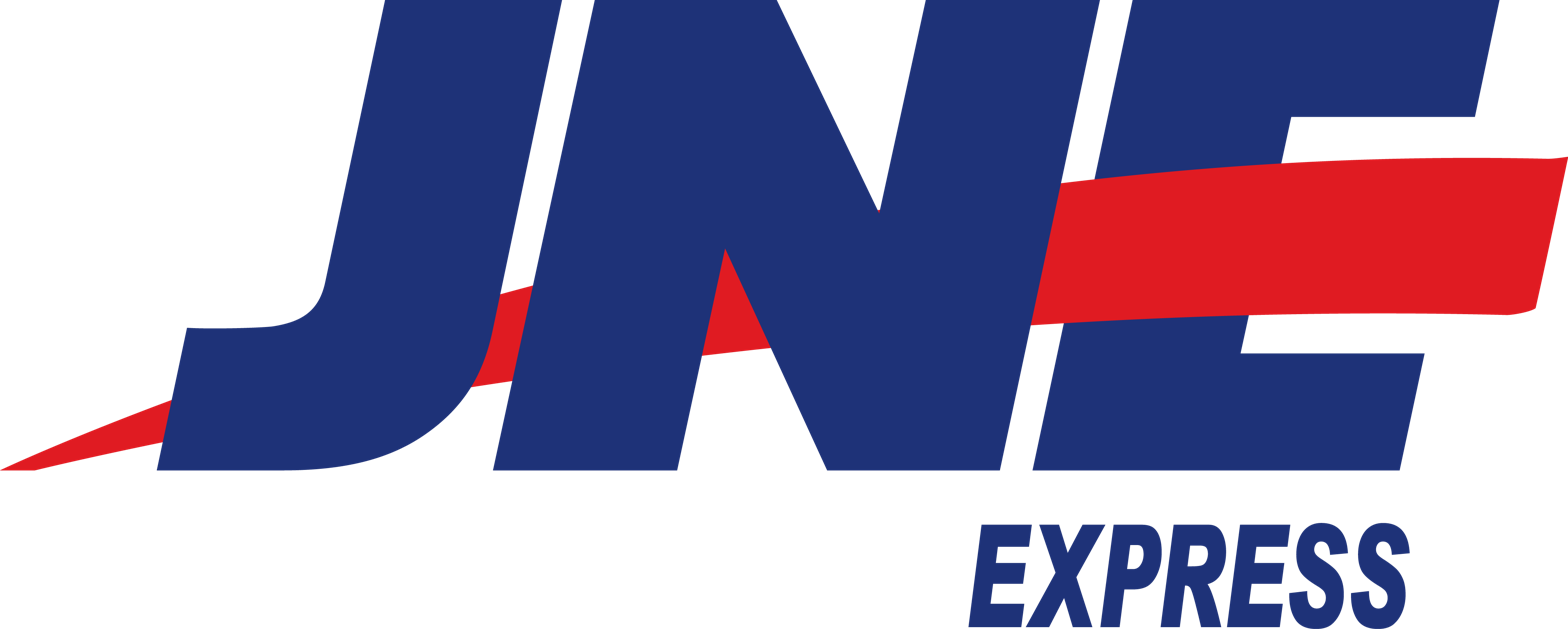

- JNE head office in Jakarta
- Trade name: JNE Express
- Type: Private
- Industry: Express Logistics
- Founded: 1990; 36 years ago
- Founder: H. Soeprapto Suparno
- Headquarters: Jakarta, Indonesia
- Area served: Indonesia
- Key people: M. Feriadi Soeprapto, president
- Services: package and delivery services
- Number of employees: 45,000 (2019)
- Website: www.jne.co.id

PT Tiki Jalur Nugraha Ekakurir (Tiki JNE), best known as JNE or JNE Express, is an Indonesian express delivery and logistics courier. The company founded the Association Courier Conference of Asia (ACCA).

== History ==
On November 26, 1990, H. Soeprapto Suparno and Johari Zein founded the PT Tiki Jalur Nugraha Ekakurir. as a division of Suparno's PT Citra Van Titipan Kilat (TIKI), to manage its international network of couriers.

Starting with eight people, including four principals who filled courier roles, and an initial capital investment of 100 million rupiah, JNE started in majoring on customs clearance and distribution for incoming courier and cargo shipments to Indonesia.

In 1991, JNE developed its international network by joining the International Air Transport Association (IATA), facilitating global delivery services, and created a network of courier companies in Indonesia, Singapore, Japan, Malaysia, the Philippines, Taiwan and Hong Kong, by forming the Association Courier Conference of Asia (ACCA). Increased competition during the early 1990s resulted in domestic expansion, as well as the parent company competing with its own division, as JNE sought to retain its local marketshare. Suparno spun JNE off in 1993. The new entity established a new logo and policies, distinguishing it from TIKI.

Undergoing rapid growth, JNE acquired real estate in 2002 and established the JNE Sorting Center in Jakarta where, in 2004, the JNE headquarters was also acquired.

In 2018, JNE announced the construction of a mega logistics hub near Soekarno–Hatta International Airport to increase its parcel handling capacity in response to the rapid growth of e-commerce in Indonesia. The facility represented an initial investment of about Rp500 billion and was expected to handle up to one million packages per day.

Following the death of the founder in 2015, his son, M. Feriadi Soeprapto, became a director and president of the company, which then had approximately 5,000 outlets and employed about 13,000 individuals. In 2019, it had a delivery fleet of about 10,000 vehicles and employed 45,000 Indonesians. Other company directors are Chandra Fireta and Edi Santoso.

== TIKI and JNE ==
Starting as a division from TIKI, JNE eventually split from TIKI and became an independent company. Both companies are founded by Suparno.
