= Package theft =

Theft of a package or parcel

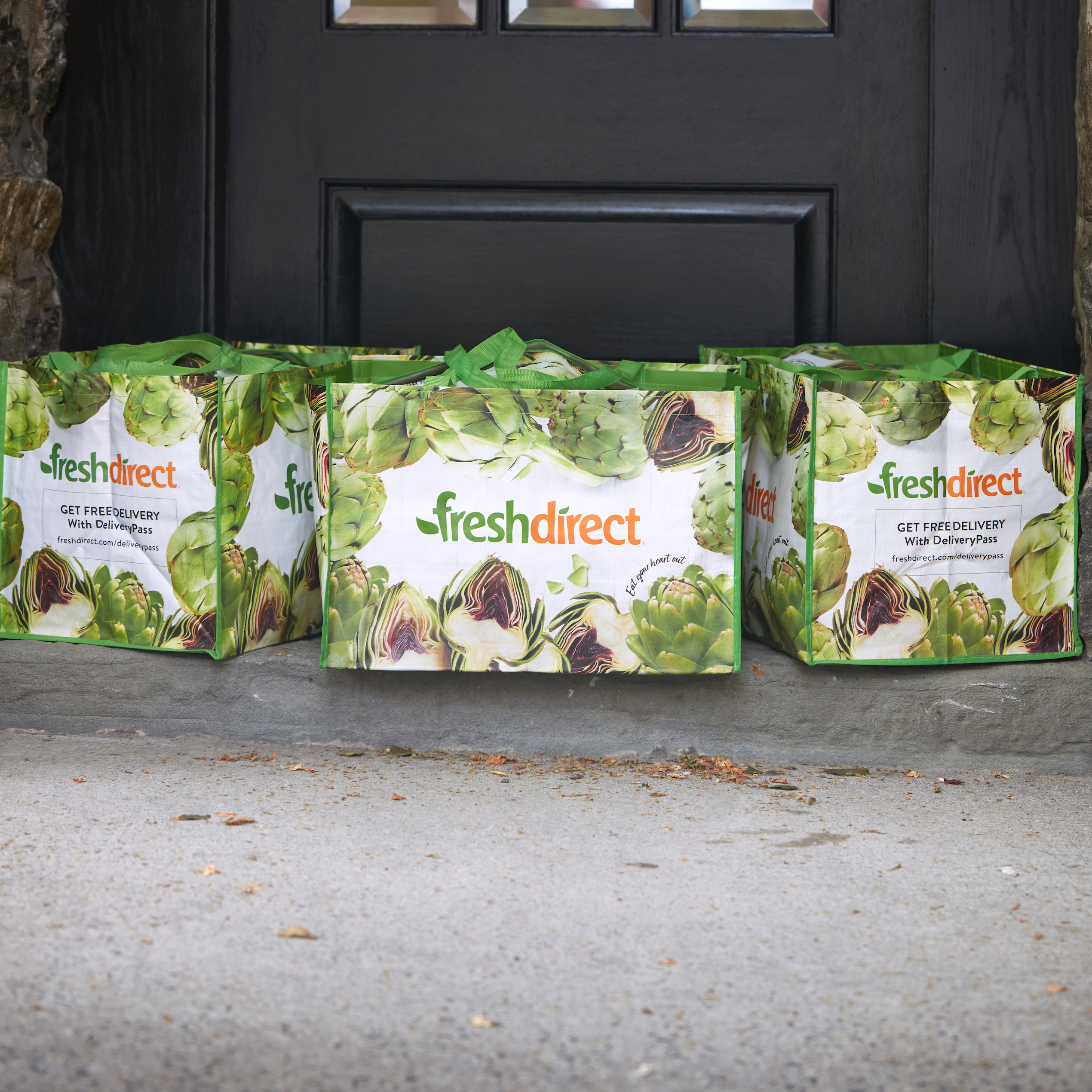
Several packages left unattended on a porch, a typical target for package thieves

Package theft or cargo theft is the theft of a package or parcel. It can occur anywhere in the distribution channel.

One major type of package theft is porch piracy, which has been defined as, "Taking possession of a package or its contents, outside of a residence or business, where it has been commercially delivered or has been left for commercial pickup, with intent to deprive the rightful owner of the contents or even try to sell the contents.

According to reports, porch piracy is widely regarded as a difficult crime to resolve, with a mere 10% of cases resulting in an arrest by the police. A significant number of these incidents remain unsolved. Porch piracy is typically thwarted by using parcel lockers or other services that prevent the package from being left unattended, though these often require the recipient to go out of their way to receive the package.

== Distribution channel ==
Packages, pallet loads, and full truck loads are subject to theft. This can take place anywhere from the shipper, carrier, or consignee. It can involve individuals with an opportunity to take a package or can involve organized crime. Security systems involving surveillance systems, tracking systems, and broader corporate security are needed to resist the theft of material. Estimates of cargo loss and theft range from two to thirty billion dollars a year.

Some theft involves package pilferage where all or part of the contents are taken from the package. Sometimes a weight or object is placed into the pilfered package, the package is resealed, and then sent on its way through the remainder of the distribution system. Package tracking continues but the contents of the package could be gone.

== Theft of delivered packages from households ==
The term porch piracy refers to a situation in which an individual steals a package from a porch or other area near the main entrance of a residence before the recipient can retrieve it. The problem is often underreported to the police, since major online retailers often return or refund items with no questions asked if the item is stolen. While the severity of the crime in the United States is usually only minor, as of 2019, many lawmakers have begun to push for punishments of increased severity due to the increase of such crimes.

=== Incidence of theft ===
The rate of package theft in the United States has been steadily increasing, with 90,000 packages disappearing daily in New York City alone in 2019, up 20 percent from four years prior. Across the country, more than 1.7 million packages are stolen or go missing daily, adding up to $25 million in lost goods and services. 2025 estimates note a national decrease in daily package thefts at 250,000 reported events, since the pandemic effects continue to dissolve.

An average family receives 27 packages a year, each year about 19% of families have had a package stolen. That implies that probability of a package being stolen roughly 0.2 percent. Most thefts occur when no one is at home. Thefts are more common during the holiday season. The average value an item stolen is about $140.

=== Methods of theft ===
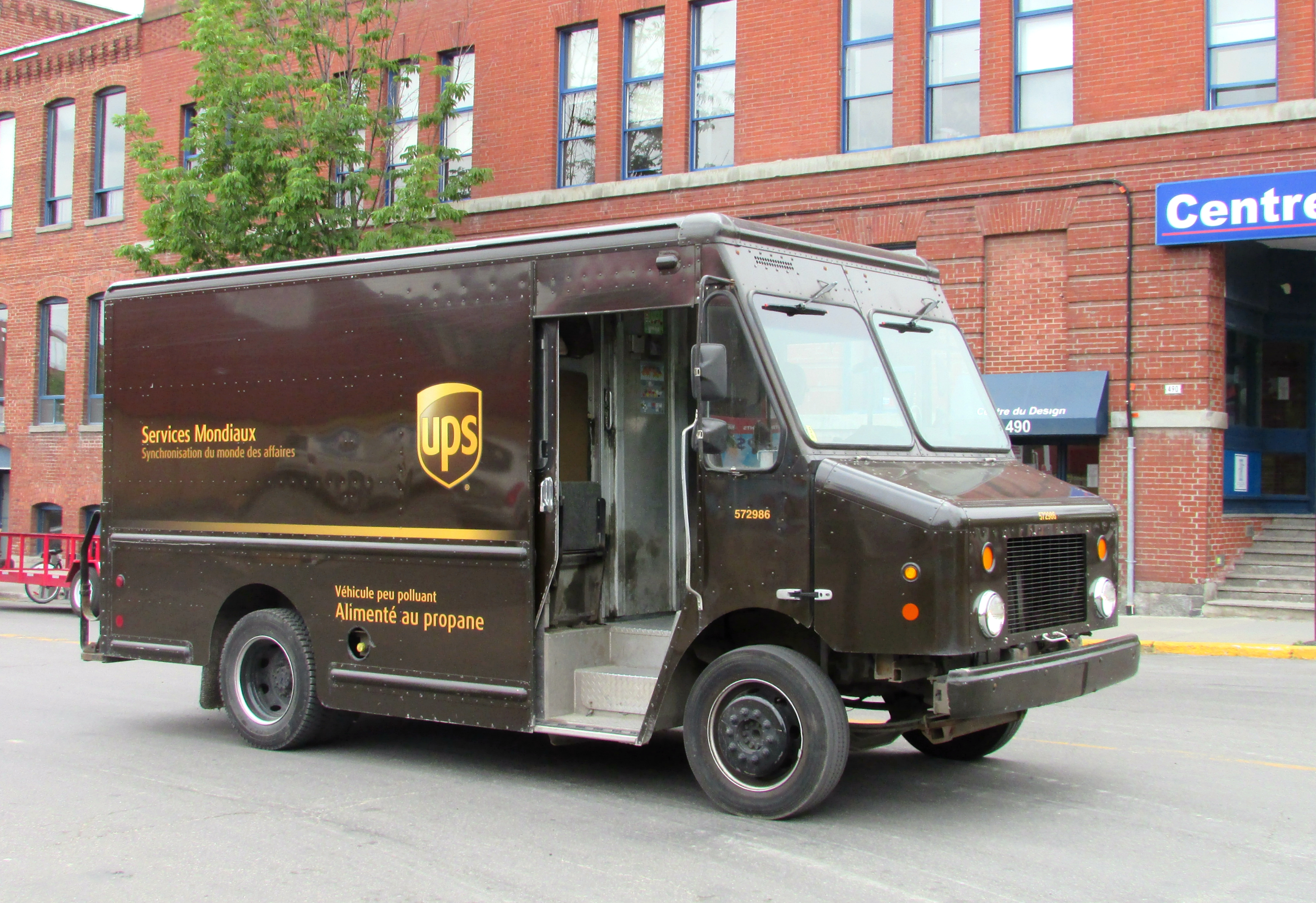
A package delivery truck may be followed by package thieves in order to steal packages shortly after delivery

In suburbs and rural areas, some thieves follow delivery trucks and grab packages immediately after they are delivered.

In urban areas, packages are most often stolen from homes close to the roadway (within 25 feet), when a brand is displayed on the box, during daylight hours, and if the package is medium size and visible from the street.

=== Severity of crime ===
Package theft is often considered a minor crime that is not worthy of investigation by police. In most circumstances, once a package is delivered the resident would be considered the victim of a theft, but delivery companies and retailers often provide refunds or replacements, which impacts the entire supply chain. Porch piracy and package theft is often a crime of opportunity. In New York City, such cases are considered petit larceny, unless the value is above $1000 USD, in which case they are considered grand larceny. In Texas, package theft is considered a Class C misdemeanor if the value is under $100, the same type as a speeding ticket. However, in 2019, lawmakers across the United States began to push for more serious punishments. Three bills in the Texas Legislature, including HB 37 and HB 760, and a bill called the Defense Against Porch Pirates Act in South Carolina, proposed that package theft be considered a felony. In the Texas bill, thieves could face up to 10 years in prison.

=== Package theft prevention ===
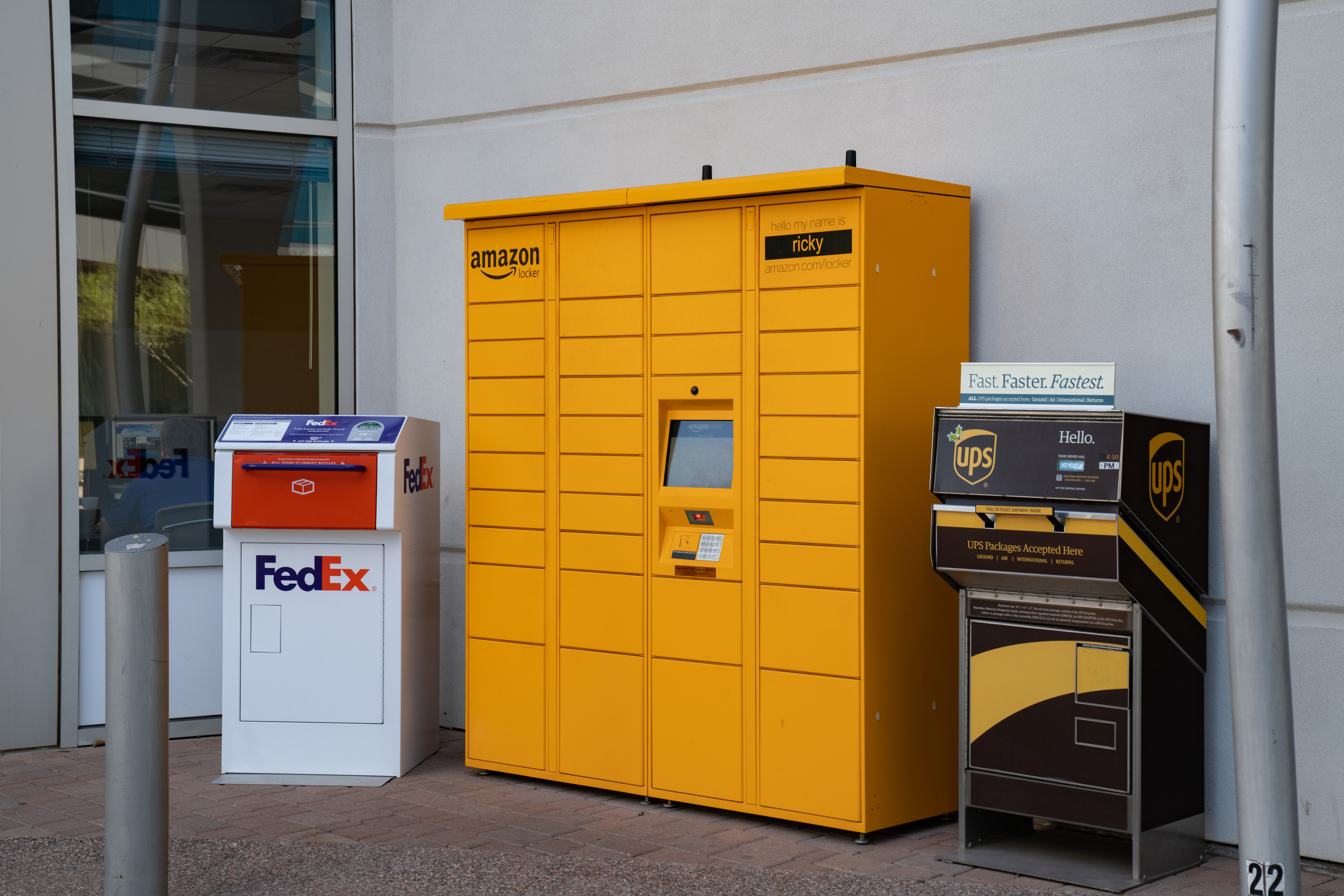
An example of a parcel locker used to prevent package theft

In buildings without doorbells, packages are often left in public areas that are easily accessed by thieves. The lack of an easy method to stop package theft has caused many to turn to neighbors to receive their packages for them. It has also led to increased income for businesses that offer mailbox services. The e-commerce company Amazon began offering delivery to car trunks or parcel lockers or letting delivery people inside the home of the recipient with Amazon Key. It also began a program to share theft video from Ring doorbell cameras with police, but this led to controversy about privacy concerns.

Lockable package delivery boxes can be used on a porch or at the curb, allow a delivery person to push a button allowing the package to be put inside, with the homeowner using a key to access the box, but early versions allowed only one package to be delivered. Couriers may, in the event the recipient is not at home, take the parcel or package to their nearest affiliated postal service outlet to be held securely, and leave a note in the recipient's letter box, with its address and estimated time on when it can be picked up. In addition, some e-commerce platforms offer a selection and map of local delivery lockers, participating businesses, and postal service outlets, where packages can be delivered to, instead of directly to the recipient.

Researchers have suggested that human presence were strongly effective for first-time or inexperienced offenders, but not so much for repetitive offenders. Some of this presence includes doorbell cameras and police visibility, as surveyed from convicted package thieves. Thieves considered these surveillances helped form their perception and opportunity risk. Frequent offenders, however, are less deterred due to desensitization and confidence.

Traditional prevention methods such as videos, fences, and obvious signs of someone being home do not appear to deter package theft. Prevention methods include concealing packages (e.g., removing branding on boxes, placing packages out of view), removing the target (e.g., delivery to a POD, delivery in late afternoons), increasing the effort (e.g., lockable containers), and increasing the risk (e.g., neighborhood watch, package alarms). Some individuals have taken to rigging decoy parcels with glitter bombs, low-grade explosives, blank round firing mechanisms, and even cat or dog feces in an effort to deter thieves.

== See also ==
- Package pilferage
- Package delivery
- Supply chain security
