= The Net Global =

Express courier service

- Company type: Holding Company (private)
- Industry: Delivery (commerce), Warehouse, Freight, Logistics
- Founded: Beirut, Lebanon (1994)
- Founder: Mourad Aoun (co-founder)
- Headquarters: MENAT
- Area served: Worldwide
- Key people: Mourad Aoun (CEO)
- Products: Express Deliveries, eCommerce Solutions, Fulfillment & 3PL Warehousing, Freight & Logistics, Critical & Pharma, Specialized Projects
- Website: www.thenetglobal.group

The Net Global provides distribution reach covering the supply chain across various sectors and industries.

The Net Global provides distribution service options to individuals, e-tailers, consolidators, B2B and B2C requirements by providing them with: Domestic and International Express Deliveries, eCommerce Solutions, 3PL Warehousing and eCommerce Fulfillment, and Freight and Logistics Services, covering various industries in the MENAT region.

== History ==
Mourad Aoun, a Lebanese entrepreneur started The Net Holding in 1994 as a representation of Skynet Worldwide Express.
