= Doorman (company) =

American technology company

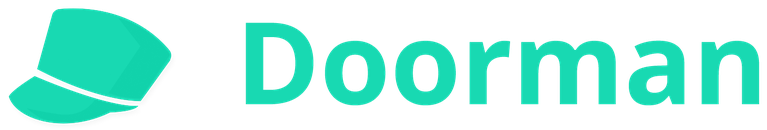
- Company type: Private
- Founded: 2013; 13 years ago
- Dissolved: October 6, 2017; 9 years ago
- Headquarters: San Francisco, California, United States
- Area served: San Francisco; Chicago; New York City
- Founders: Zander Adell; Kapil Israni
- CEO: Zander Adell
- Key people: Zander Adell; Kapil Israni; Zach Krasner; Shaun Baker; Chris Gadek
- Industry: Technology, Logistics
- Services: Package Delivery; Online Returns Pickup; Fulfillment
- Current status: Defunct
- Native clients on: iOS, Android

Doorman was a privately held American technology company specializing in logistics services and products. The company managed and operated fulfillment centers and independent driver fleets in densely populated urban areas, addressing the last mile gap between online retailers and their customers. It also developed, marketed and operated the Doorman mobile app, which allowed consumers to use their iOS or Android-based smartphone to schedule evening delivery of goods purchased online, or arrange pick up of goods intended to be shipped back to an online retailer.

The company also offered direct-to-consumer e-commerce brands fulfillment and same-day package delivery services through the use of its application programming interface. By May 2016, Doorman operated locations in San Francisco, Chicago, and New York City. Citing financial difficulties and operating at a loss Doorman ceased to operate on October 6, 2017.

== History ==
Doorman was founded in 2013 by Zander Adell and Kapil Israni and is headquartered in San Francisco, California.

In February 2014, 500 Startups announced that Doorman would take part in Batch 8 of its business accelerator program.

In October 2015, the company expanded its operations to Chicago, and in November to New York City.

== Funding ==
In June 2015, the company raised $1.5 million in seed funding, led by Motus Ventures and included participation from WTI, MicroVentures, and VGO Ventures. In September 2015, Doorman raised an additional $1.5 million in seed funding from Matrix Partners, Structure Capital, VGO Ventures and others.

== Product ==
Users must download the Doorman app to their iOS or Android-based phone, sign up, enter a valid phone number, and enter a valid form of payment to utilize the service. Upon signing up, the user is given a unique shipping address (similar to a P.O. Box) at their local Doorman warehouse to have their goods shipped to. Doorman then notifies the user when it receives the users package via its smartphone app. When a user wants their package(s) delivered, he or she opens the app and schedules package delivery during the one or two-hour delivery window of their choice.

In January 2016, Doorman announced the ability for customers to request the pickup of return items they purchased online.

== In Mass Media ==
CEO Zander Adell pitched Doorman on Season 6 Episode 13 of the ABC investment television show Shark Tank (which also featured fellow San Francisco startup Coffee Meets Bagel), where it got an investment from shark Robert Herjavec.

Adell frequently appears on both regional and national television broadcasts around the holidays. Adell has appeared on CNBC's Squawk Box, Good Morning America, and regional news broadcasts in San Francisco, Chicago, and New York on CBS, ABC, FOX, and NBC.
