= Google Express =

Same-day shopping service from Google

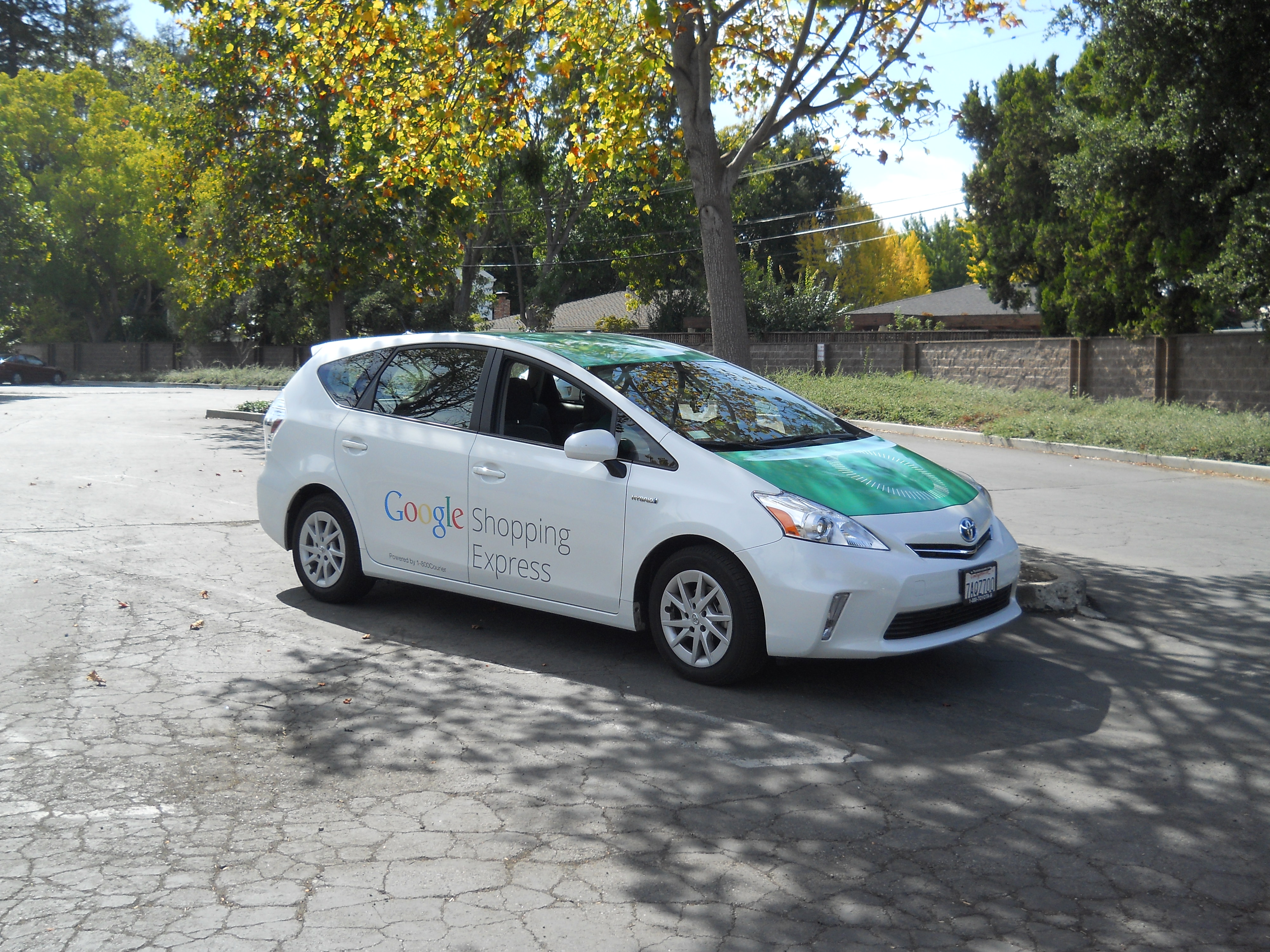
Google Shopping Express vehicle, original livery

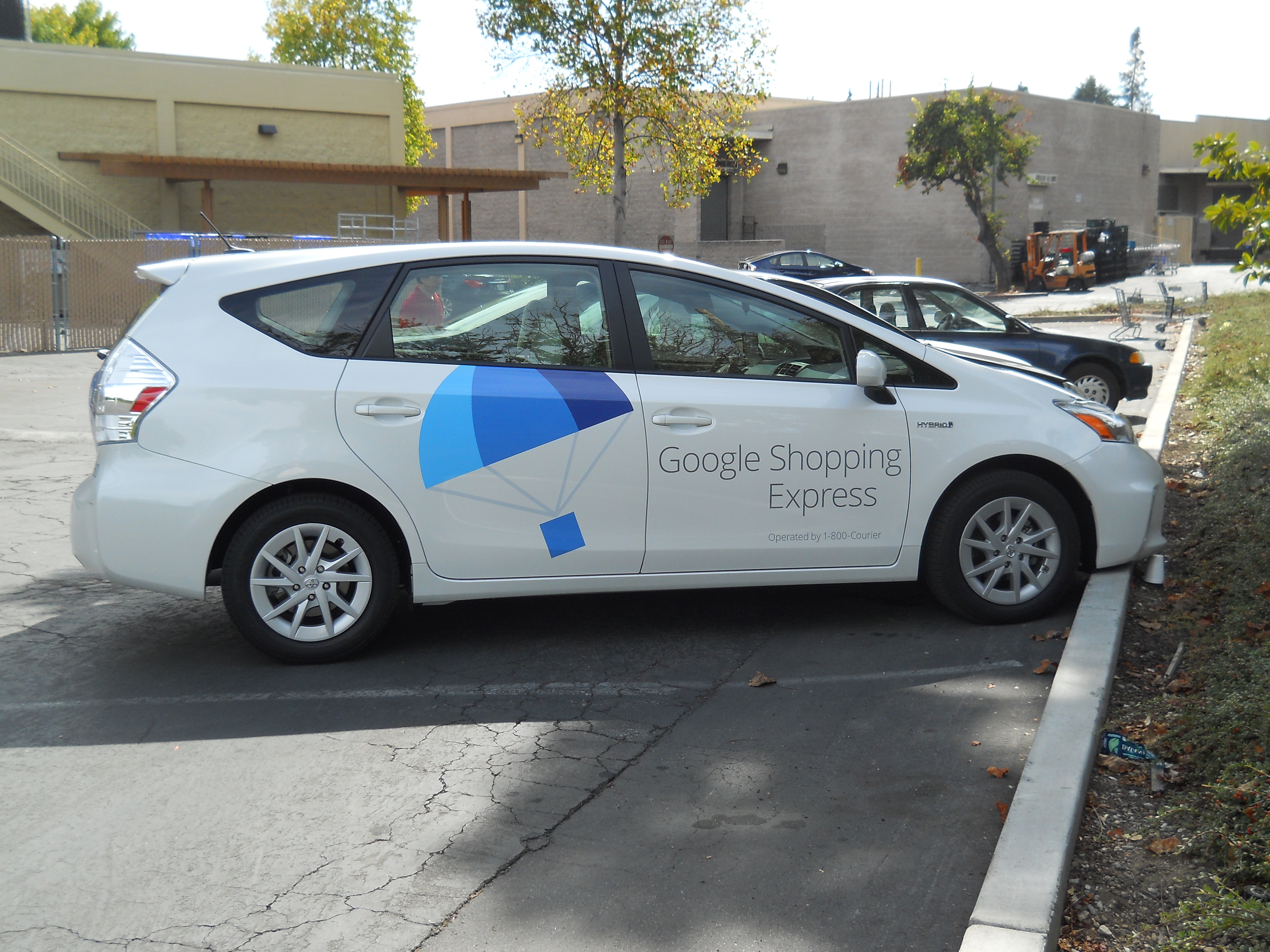
Google Shopping Express vehicle, newer livery

Google Express, formerly Google Shopping Express, was a service from Google.

At Google Marketing Live in May 2019, Google announced the integration of Google Express and its more than two thousand partner stores into the new Google Shopping. Google Shopping incorporates the functionality and capabilities of Express plus other pre-existing features of Google Shopping, like the ability to compare prices and places to buy from online and offline stores.

Google Express was a shopping service from Google available in some parts of the United States that was launched on a free trial basis across the San Francisco Peninsula. Originally, it was a same-day service, but it later expanded to same-day and overnight delivery. Pricing was originally the same as in-person shopping, but later increased; Google Express Help said, "Because item prices are set by stores, sometimes you'll see prices on Google Express that differ from what you'd see in the store: this depends both on the merchant and the location of the store your items come from."

The service was first announced in March 2013, from San Francisco as far south as San Jose, California. Retailers include a mix of national and local stores. It was publicly launched on September 25, 2013, with some added retailers but still restricted to San Francisco and Silicon Valley. Apps for Android and Apple smartphones were announced the same day; using these enables customers to use their loyalty accounts. In May 2014 the service was expanded to New York City and West Los Angeles, and in October 2014 service was added in Chicago, Boston, and Washington, DC, as well as additional retailers.

At launch, Google waived the subscription fee for testers and for the first six months after sign-up; the fee is somewhat below that for Amazon Prime. Amazon, which is also testing same-day delivery in selected markets, is the main competitor. Delivery began with Prius sedans in Google Shopping Express livery, about 50 cars as of August 2013, when the service was available in 88 ZIP codes. The fleet was later expanded to include Ford Transit vans, and the company announced it might use bicycle and on-foot delivery in some areas. The deliveries are subcontracted to a courier service, initially 1-800-Courier, and later also OnTrac. In the testing phase, retailers were not charged, or paid only a nominal fee. Customers pay $5 per shopping stop and receive deliveries within a three- to five-hour window. Customers must have a Google Pay account.

The service displays a map of the merchandise pickup and delivery locations, and attempts to use the nearest available outlet, although not always successfully.

In October 2017, merchant partners included Walmart, Target, Costco, and Fry's Electronics.

== See also ==
- Kozmo.com, now-defunct 1998–2001 business that provided a similar service
- Package delivery § Same-day delivery
