= Package delivery =

Type of delivery service

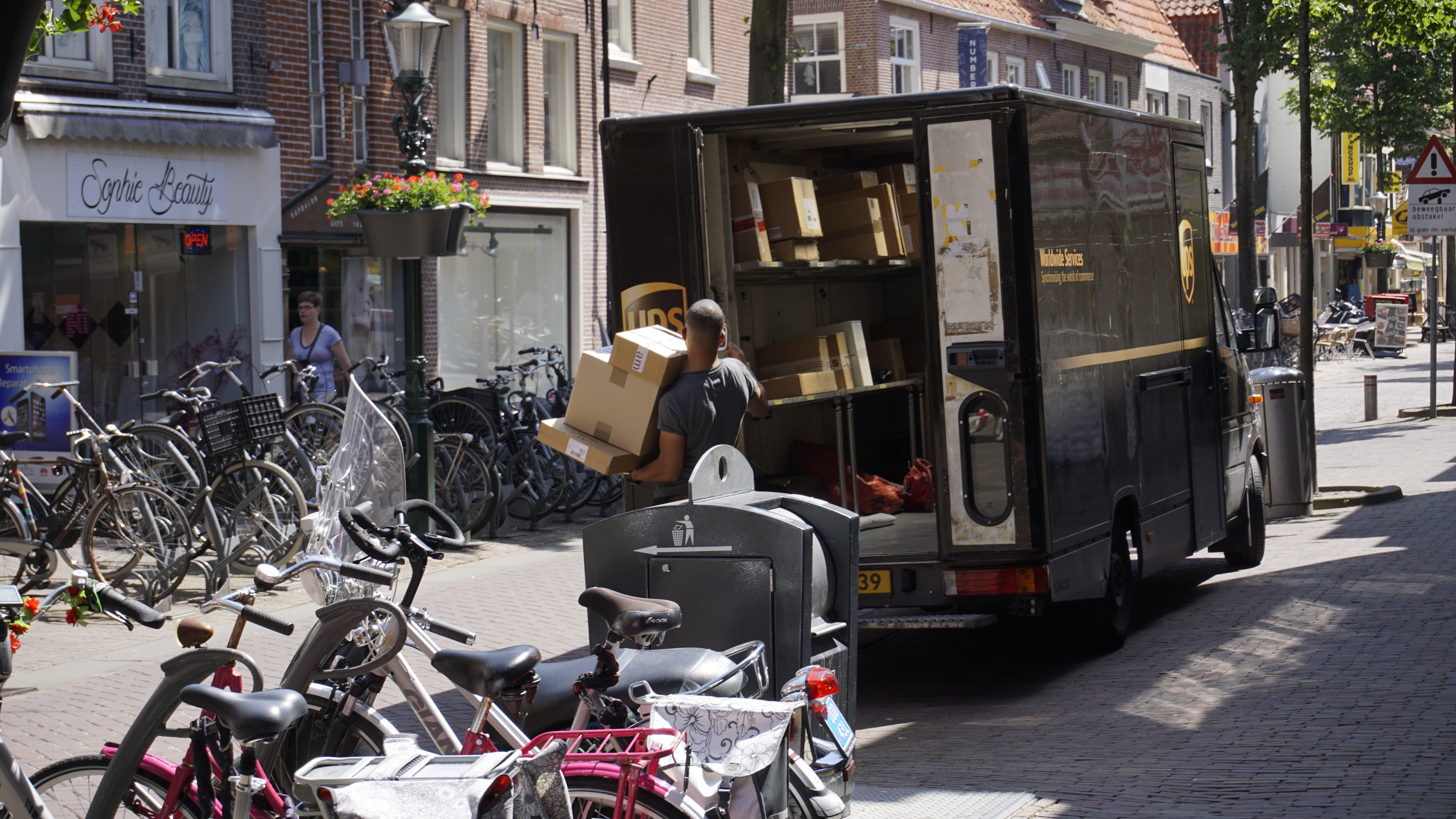
Package delivery from a UPS truck

Package delivery, or parcel delivery, is a multifaceted logistics business, catering to several small and medium-sized clients that engage in sending or receiving shipments. Parcel delivery, or courier services, entails the transportation and delivery of small, lightweight parcels by an employee utilizing either a motorized vehicle (such as a delivery van, truck, car, or motorcycle) or a non-motorized vehicle (such as a conventional bicycle or cargo bike), encompassing door-to-door and expedited delivery options (e.g., on-demand pick-up or scheduled delivery). The parcels are often single-use containers that may contain hazardous or delicate items. Small package shipping contrasts with freight shipping since the former involves smaller and lighter packages, facilitating easier transportation.

The service is provided by most postal systems, express mail, private courier companies, and less-than-truckload shipping carriers. Package delivery differs by country due to varying shipping costs and population size. In 2019, for example, China, the United States, and Japan were the top countries in terms of package delivery volume while Latvia, Macau, and Iceland ranked at the bottom. This can be explained in part by the population of the bottom three nations totaling 2 million while the top three represent a population of almost 2 billion.

== Package delivery by country ==
=== Package delivery in China ===
In China, there are about 7,500 companies with permission to give the parcel delivery services at the end of 2011, most of which are small and medium-sized enterprises and work as franchisees. In most cases, these truck operators are not given the job directly from shippers and consumers, but rather they are given the operation of collection and distribution from their franchisers. In these franchise systems, though they have an advantage in low transportation charges, their low service quality due to a lack of stable education and training is considered to be a big problem.

There used to be only state enterprises such as EMS (China Post), China Air Express (CAE), China Rail Express (CRE), and Sinotrans Air (SINOAIR), with a nationwide network in the Chinese parcel delivery market. However, recently, the appearance of private companies with national networks such as Shentong Express, YTO Express, ZTO Express, Best Express (HTKY), and Yunda Express can be observed. Foreign express companies such as FedEx and UPS have also expanded their national networks as well as international services. They expanded their network by themselves or by organizing operators in rural areas as their franchisees. The state enterprises used to play a dominant role in the parcel delivery market, but private companies, including foreign companies, have grown rapidly.

With this, in 2024, more than 80 billion parcels were handled from January to June, with the express delivery revenue expected to exceed 640 billion yuan ($88.22 billion), representing a year-on-year increase of around 23 percent and 14.2 percent, respectively.

SF Express is one example of logistics providers in China. It is China’s largest private carrier by market value (Wang and Glamann 2018). In 2017, SF handled a total of 3.05 billion shipments, an 18% increase compared to 2016. All its shipments are distributed by its full-time employees to customers’ doorsteps via self-operated trucks and airplanes, or high-speed trains, which helps SF achieve speedy, reliable, and professional pickup and delivery services.

Cainiao Network, the logistics affiliate of Alibaba Group, is another example. In 2017 CN claims it delivered this year’s record volume of 812 million orders from the 11.11 online shopping festival faster than ever, including 100 million parcels within just three days, thanks to technology, investments, and collaboration.

In 2017, Alibaba achieved a GMV of CNY ¥3.8 trillion (USD $547 billion), three times as large as its US counterpart, Amazon. With these numbers, Cainiao Smart Logistics Network Limited (Cainiao) is able to assist with the handling of inventory and parcel deliveries, opened up this service to all merchants on the platform. The logistics platform organized the shipping of 23% more packages than last year. In addition to the record volume of delivery orders, Cainiao also set records for delivery times. The first package arrived to a customer in Shanghai within 12 minutes of kick-off, beating the previous year's record of 13 minutes. At the three-day mark, the first 100 million shipments had reached their destination, half a day faster than in 2016 and six days faster than in 2013.

ZTO Express is another Chinese package delivery comany. In the first 10 months of 2017, the Chinese express delivery company handled over 12.9 billion parcels, reaching more than 96 percent of townships in China. Shipments of agricultural products from rural to urban markets rose by 21.5 percent year on year.

China's postal service introduced international express-mail service in 1980 and domestic express-mail service in 1984.

=== Mail order and next-day delivery in the United Kingdom ===
Welsh entrepreneur Pryce Pryce-Jones formed the first mail order company in 1861. He distributed catalogues of Welsh flannel across the United Kingdom, with customers able to order by mail for the first time—this following the Uniform Penny Post in 1840 and the invention of the postage stamp (Penny Black) where there was a charge of one penny for carriage and delivery between any two places in the United Kingdom irrespective of distance—and the goods were delivered throughout the UK via the newly created railway system. Notably, Pryce-Jones pioneered the concept of next-day delivery across large parts of the United Kingdom, a revolutionary idea at the time.

=== Package delivery in the United States ===
In 1852, Wells Fargo, one of the earliest companies to offer combined banking and express services, was formed. These functions were closely linked, as the handling of California gold and other financial assets required secure methods of transportation across the country. This placed Wells Fargo firmly in the stagecoach business and led to its participation in the Pony Express venture.

Wells Fargo was preceded by other companies, including the Butterfield Overland Stage; however, the latter's failure left much of the overland business in Wells Fargo's control and resulted in a de facto monopoly on overland traffic until 1869, when the transcontinental railroad was completed. During this period, the company carried regular mail in addition to express packages, effectively bypassing the Post Office's statutory exclusivity. A compromise was eventually reached in which Wells Fargo charged its own fee in addition to federal postage, acknowledging the Post Office's limited ability to serve all regions.

From 1869 on, package services rapidly moved to the rail, which was faster and cheaper. The express office was a universal feature of the staffed railroad station. Packages travelled as "head-end" traffic in passenger trains. In 1918 the formation of the United States Railroad Administration resulted in a consolidation of all such services into a single agency, which after the war continued as the Railway Express Agency (REA).

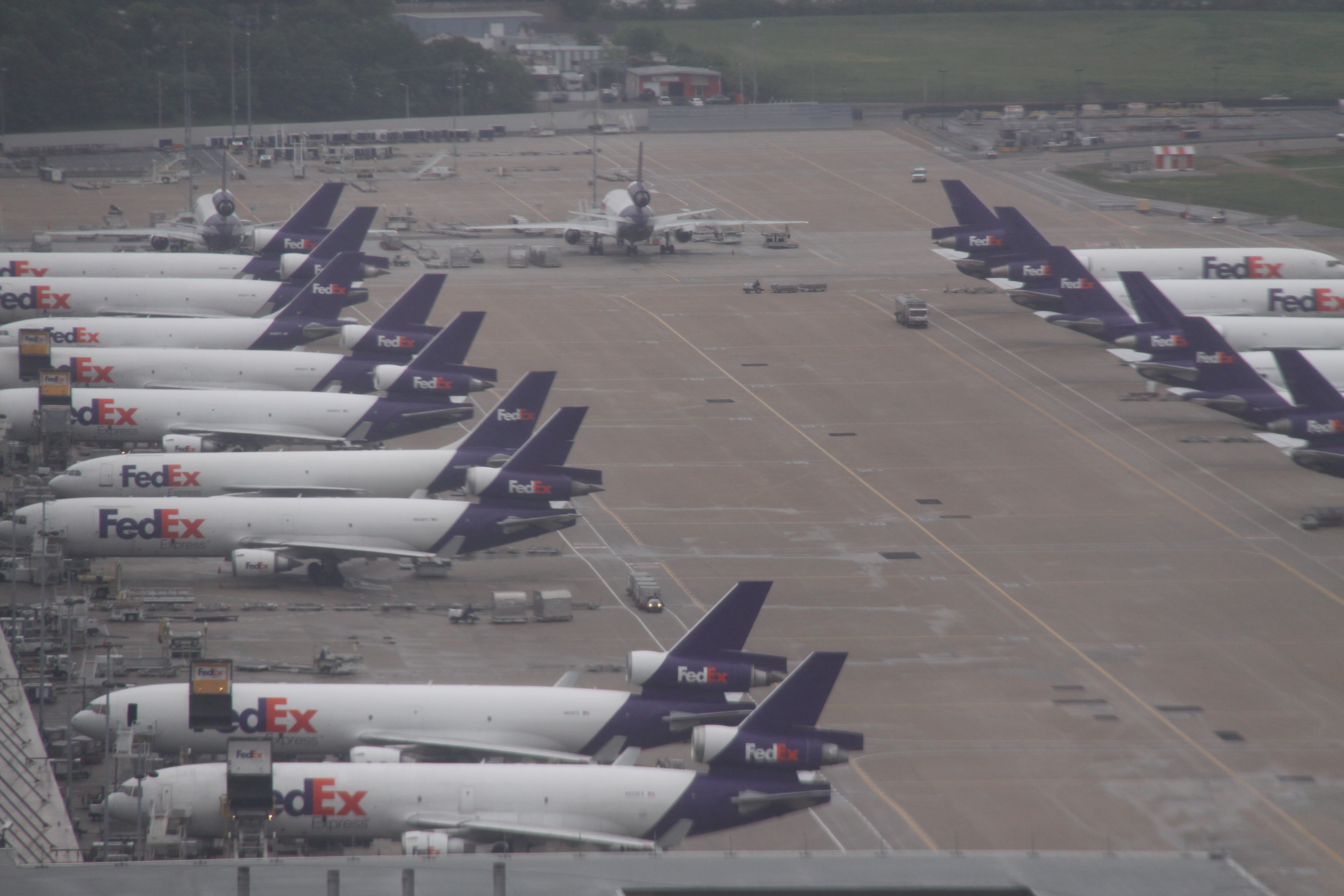
A part of the FedEx Express fleet in Memphis Airport, its main hub

On 1 January 1913, parcel post service began, providing rural postal customers with package service along with their regular mail and obviating a trip to a town substantial enough to support an express office. This, along with Rural Free Delivery, fueled a huge rise in catalogue sales. By this time the post office monopoly on mail was effectively enforced, and Wells Fargo had exited the business in favour of its banking enterprises.

Motor freight services arose quickly with the advent of gasoline and diesel-powered trucks. United Parcel Service had its origins in this era, initially as a private courier service. The general improvement of the highway system following World War II prompted its expansion into a nationwide service, and other similar services arose. At the same time, the contraction of rail passenger service hurt rail-based package shipping; these contractions led to the cancellation of the mail contracts with the railroads, which in turn caused further passenger cuts. Eventually, REA was dissolved in bankruptcy in 1975.

Air mail was conceived early, and scheduled service began in 1918. Scheduled airlines carried high-value and perishable goods from early on. The most important advance, however, came with the "hub and spoke" system pioneered by Federal Express (now known as FedEx) in 1973. With deregulation in 1977, they were able to establish an air-based system capable of delivering small packages—including mail—overnight throughout most of the country. In response, the postal service initiated a comparable Express Mail service. In the same period, they also began contracting with Amtrak to carry mail by rail. Thus, at the beginning of the 21st century, U.S. consumers could choose from a variety of public and private services offering deliveries at various combinations of speed and cost.

By 2018, parcel carriers were hauling 14% of U.S. goods, up from 10% 25 years ago, and FedEx's US domestic volume increased 4.9% in 2018, while UPS reported a 3.3% increase and a 5.6% increase in domestic next-day air package.

==== Same-day delivery ====
Fedex Ground trailer and sorting belt at the Chattanooga sorting facility in 2007

In the past decade, there has been a significant growth in same-day delivery (SDD) orders, specifically with the increasing presence of the online retail market. Roughly 51% of retailers offer SDD services, and the number is estimated to rise to 65% in the forthcoming years. Same-day delivery has become a priority for retailers, as a survey revealed that 75% of consumers would not even shop at a retailer if they could not deliver their products rapidly. Moreover, another study concluded that nearly 88% of consumers are willing to pay an additional fee for same-day or faster delivery. The concept of same-day delivery is not only prevalent among retailers but is widespread among other service domains as well. Several businesses, such as office supply stores (e.g., Staples, Office Max, Office Depot), grocers (e.g., FreshDirect, Ocado), and pharmaceutical and package deliveries (e.g., UPS, Airborne, FedEx, and Deutsche Post) offer direct customer deliveries.

Parcel with ruptured packaging

Incorporating SDD has its advantages, but also brings several associated business challenges. The increase in productivity, parcel movement, and warehouse efficiency are the primary benefits, but increasing the speed of inventory turnover without modifying the existing infrastructure to adapt will increase the risk of both employee injury and product damage. In some cases, products may be thrown or slung around because it is the only method fast enough to keep up with the required inventory turnover rate. In addition, as the need for faster delivery methods increases continuously, the shipping costs to fulfill customer orders will inflate as well. For instance, in 2018 alone, shipping costs consumed $27.7 billion (12%) of Amazon’s total revenues. With the growing number of online orders, companies also face the pressure to supply consumers with timely and reliable product distribution.

Some online grocers such as AmazonFresh and Webvan, and delivery services operated by grocery stores like Peapod and Safeway have had same-day or next-day delivery windows. Many restaurants have long delivered takeout locally on demand, and online food ordering services have expanded this to many restaurants that would otherwise not deliver.

In the 2010s, various experimental services launched, using online shopping and retail warehouses or chain stores local to the ordering consumer for fulfillment at relatively low cost. The United States Postal Service "Metro Post" started in 2012, which by 2014 was shipping Amazon orders to 15 cities. In 2013, Walmart was delivering same-day packages from its own stores in test cities via UPS.

Kozmo.com started a general one-hour local delivery service for small items in 1998, but failed in 2001. Same-day retail service Postmates began in 2011, and Google Express began in 2013 with a limited number of vendors and cities. By September 2015, Amazon Prime Now (which includes selected goods including some groceries) offered 1-hour delivery in 13 cities, and the company launched Amazon Flex, which is a service similar to Postmates using part-time workers to deliver Amazon Prime Now packages.

Some vehicle for hire companies offer courier service and delivery of items ordered online from local vendors. Startups with similar services include Doorman in San Francisco, Chicago, and New York City, Deliv in San Francisco, WeDeliver in Chicago, and Shutl in Manhattan and Chicago.

An alternative to same-day delivery is in-store pickup, which has been adopted even by previously online-only retailers like Amazon.

==== Regional parcel carriers ====
In addition, a number of regional parcel delivery companies have sprung up since the 1990s. They combine the track and trace capability of the national carriers with the ability to guarantee next-day delivery at ground rates over a larger delivery footprint. Because they are regionally based, they can improve shipment time in transit and increase shippers' productivity with later pick-up times. The regional parcel carriers can be a cost-effective enhancement to UPS and FedEx because they do not charge the full array of accessorial charges mentioned in the section above.

==== Heavy goods delivery ====
Fedex Ground truck partially loaded with carpets shipped from the Dalton, Georgia carpet plants

Delivery of heavy goods, such as furniture or large appliances, requires a different logistical process than most small parcel couriers. For example, the supply chain of shipping large household goods from their manufacturers, to residential or business locations throughout the country and world is more complex and carries with it a higher potential for damage and error than with smaller packages.

Specialized less than truckload shipping carriers handle shipping furniture and other heavy goods from the manufacturer to a last mile hub. The last mile problem can also include the challenge of making deliveries in urban areas. Deliveries to retail stores, restaurants, and other merchants in a central business district often contribute to congestion and safety problems. Once the goods arrive at the last-mile hub, which is typically located less than 200 miles from the final delivery location, a dedicated last-mile carrier, also known as a white-glove delivery company, will handle the final leg of the delivery.

White glove refers to the highest service level for last-mile delivery of heavy goods. It involves the delivery team bringing the item to the room of choice, unpacking and assembling it, and removing all packaging and debris from the customer's home. There are over 4,000 white-glove delivery companies in the United States, most of which only perform local deliveries. Some large less-than-truckload shipping carriers also offer white-glove delivery service, and in recent years start-ups have emerged that offer nationwide networks of white-glove delivery coverage. With the growth of E-commerce websites that sell heavy goods throughout the country and world the white glove delivery marketplace is shifting from mostly regional carriers working with local brick and mortar stores to E-commerce websites working with national delivery networks.

== Package design for distribution ==
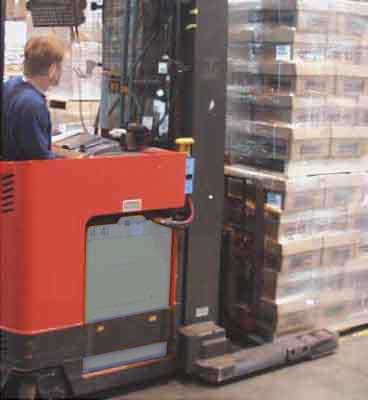
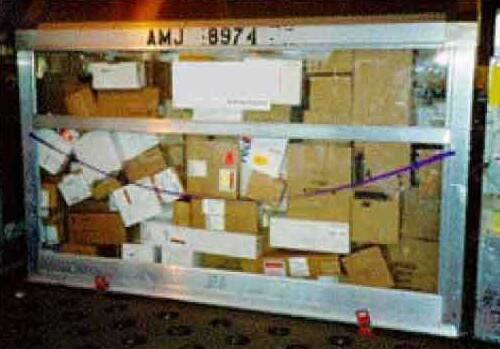
Transport packaging needs to be matched to its logistics system. Packages designed for controlled shipments of uniform pallet loads (left) may not be suited to mixed shipments with express carriers (right)

The individual sorting and handling systems of small parcel carriers can put severe stress on the packages and contents. Packaging needs to be designed for the potential hazards that may be encountered in parcel delivery systems. The major carriers have a packaging engineering staff that provides packaging guidelines and sometimes package design and package testing services. Many e-retailers have specific packaging requirements for their suppliers and also offer assistance in package design.

When shopping retail orders from a warehouse, such as for online shopping, multiple items are often placed in a single box (secondary packaging) for cheaper and easier transportation and tracking. This creates waste when there is only a single item that could be transported without an outer box (for example something that already has durable retail primary packaging). To avoid this problem, some items are designated in the industry as ships in own container (SIOC) and will receive only a shipping label. Some products are specifically designed as SIOC for environmental or cost reasons.

Package testing procedures include:

- ASTM International D7386- Standard Practice for Performance Testing of Packages for Single Parcel Delivery Systems.
- International Safe Transit Association

Project 3K: Fast Moving Consumer Goods for the European Retail Supply Chain
6-FEDEX-A: FedEx Procedures for Testing Packaged Products Weighing Up to 150 lbs
6-FEDEX-B: FedEx Procedures for Testing Packaged Products Weighing Over 150 lbs
6-SAMSCLUB, Packaged-Products for Sam's Club® Distribution System Shipment
Procedure 7D: Thermal Controlled Transport Packaging for Parcel Delivery System Shipment

== Recipients ==
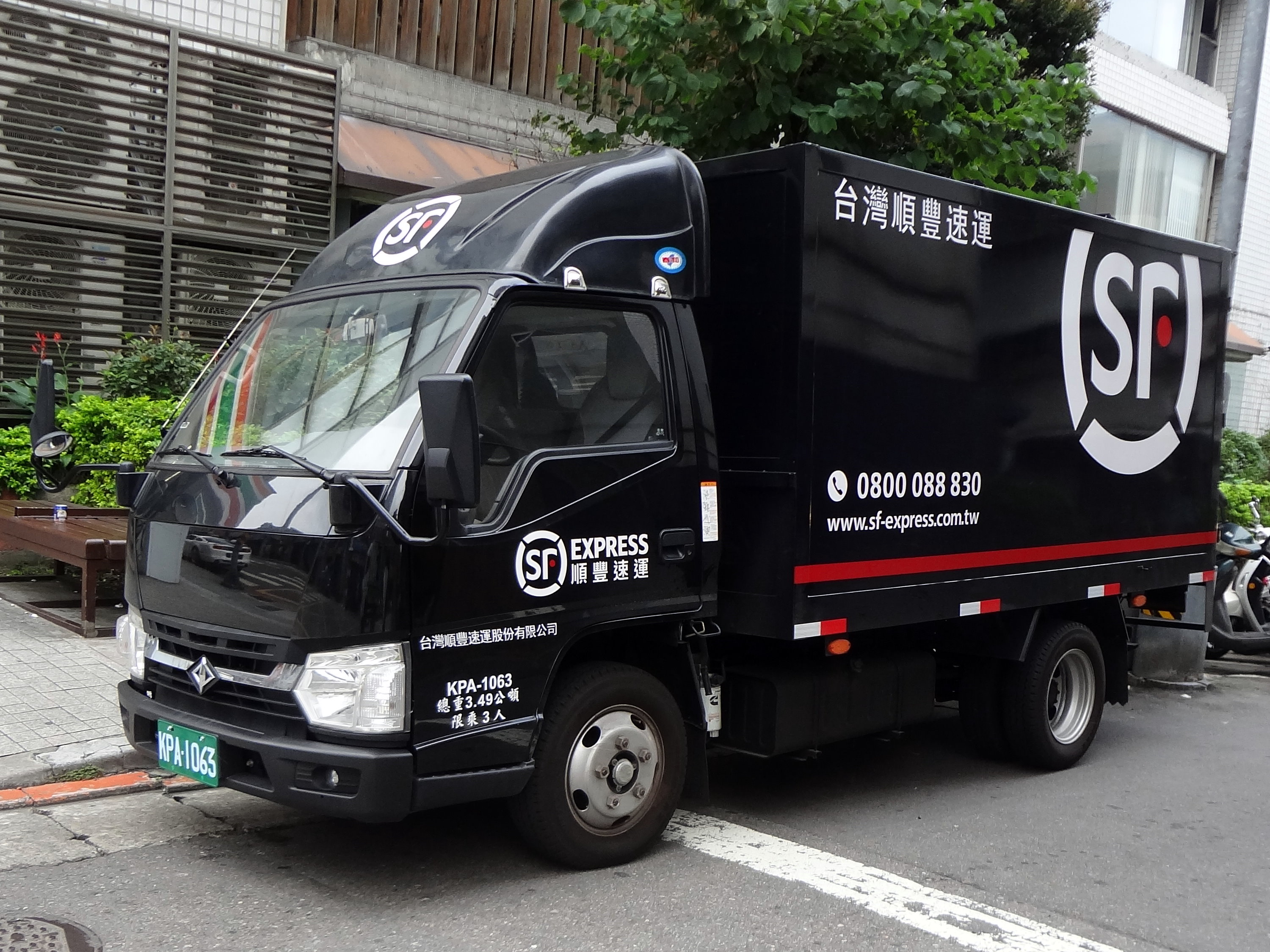
A SF Express delivery truck

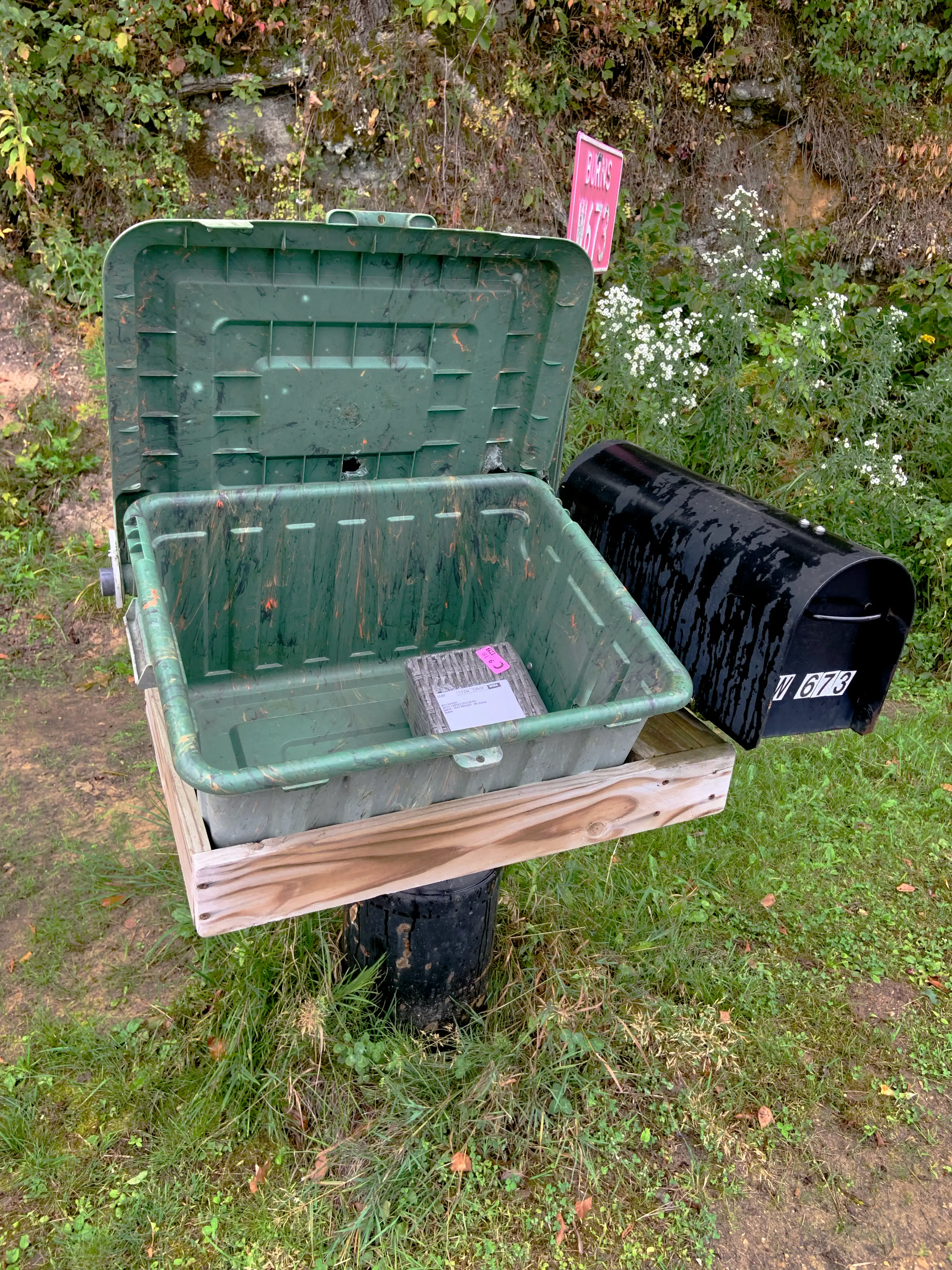
Parcel box next to mailbox at the end of a long driveway out in the country

Recipients, if they are to receive packages in a timely and appropriate manner, must accommodate carriers. With the rise of the sharing economy multiple family dwellings with restricted access face difficulties due to the increasing volume of deliveries, some of which, such as food, may be time-sensitive. Some have built storage rooms for packages and installed refrigerators.

Recipients often choose to use a high-capacity "parcel box" which will store large numbers of items and mail at the same time. Deposited items are securely stored with the use of internal security baffles which allow parcels to drop down into the lower portions of the box whilst restricting the theft of items through the aperture opening.

== Temperature considerations ==
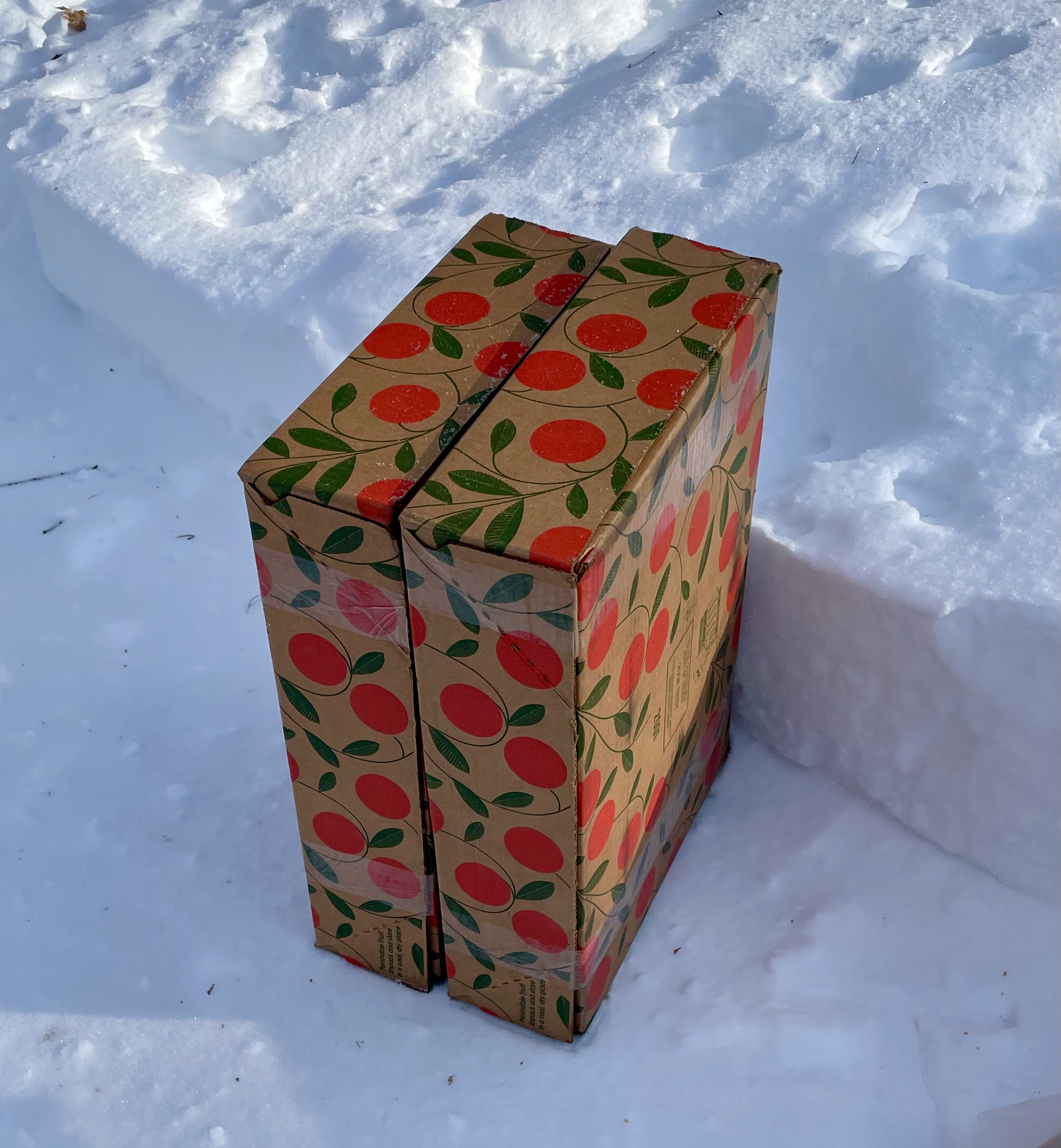
Frozen delivery: Boxes of fresh oranges and grapefruit delivered at side of street in winter

Prolonged extreme temperature exposure is an important consideration for the delivery of some types of products. Many delivery vans are not controlled for temperature: Delivered items may sit unattended for hours on porches, on driveways, or in mailboxes.

Potential heat exposure may cause degradation to some pharmaceuticals, live plants, foods, paint, cut flowers, chemicals, etc. Packages sitting on hot pavement or in the direct sun can become very hot. Sunlight on enclosed mailboxes can amplify the ambient temperature. For example, the USFDA found that the temperature in a steel mailbox painted black could reach 136 °F (58 °C) in full sun while the ambient air temperature was 101 °F (38 °C).

Similarly, extreme cold temperatures can damage or degrade other types of products.

Several options may help. Insulated shipping containers, thermal bags, or special mailing envelopes are sometimes used. Some carriers offer express delivery or "special handling". Consignees may be required to personally accept delivery to prevent unattended drop-offs. Temperature data loggers, analog devices, and thermochromic inks are available to help identify temperature abuse.

== See also ==
- Delivery (commerce) – Process of transporting goods from a source location to a predefined destination
- Delivery drone – Unmanned aerial vehicle (UAV) used to transport packages, food or other goods
- Document automation – Design of systems for electronic documents
- Fire sign (address) – Roadside sign showing a place's address
- Last mile (transportation) – Final leg of a journey in logistics
- Mail carrier – Postal worker
- Package pilferage – Theft of part of the contents of a package
- Package theft – Theft of a package or parcel
- Parcel post – Type of mailing
- Porch pirate – Theft of a package or parcel
- Shipping list
