= Breaking bulk (law) =

In law, breaking bulk is the act of removing something from a package or parcel, or in any way destroying its entirety. It was thus important in connection with the subject of bailment, involving as it did the curious distinction that where a bailee received possession of goods in a box or package, and then sold them as a whole, he was guilty only of a breach of trust, but if he "broke bulk" or caused a separation of the goods, and sold a part or all, he was guilty of felony. This distinction was abolished by the Larceny Act 1861, which enacted that whoever, being a bailee of any chattel, money or valuable security, should fraudulently take or convert the same to his own use, or the use of any person other than the owner, although he should not break bulk or otherwise determine the bailment, should be guilty of larceny (s. 3).

Breaking bulk may be used for bulk material ordered broken up in part shipment and shipped to location in different cargo.

== See also ==
- Inchoate crime
- Embezzlement
- Package pilferage
