= Package pilferage =

Theft of part of the contents of a package

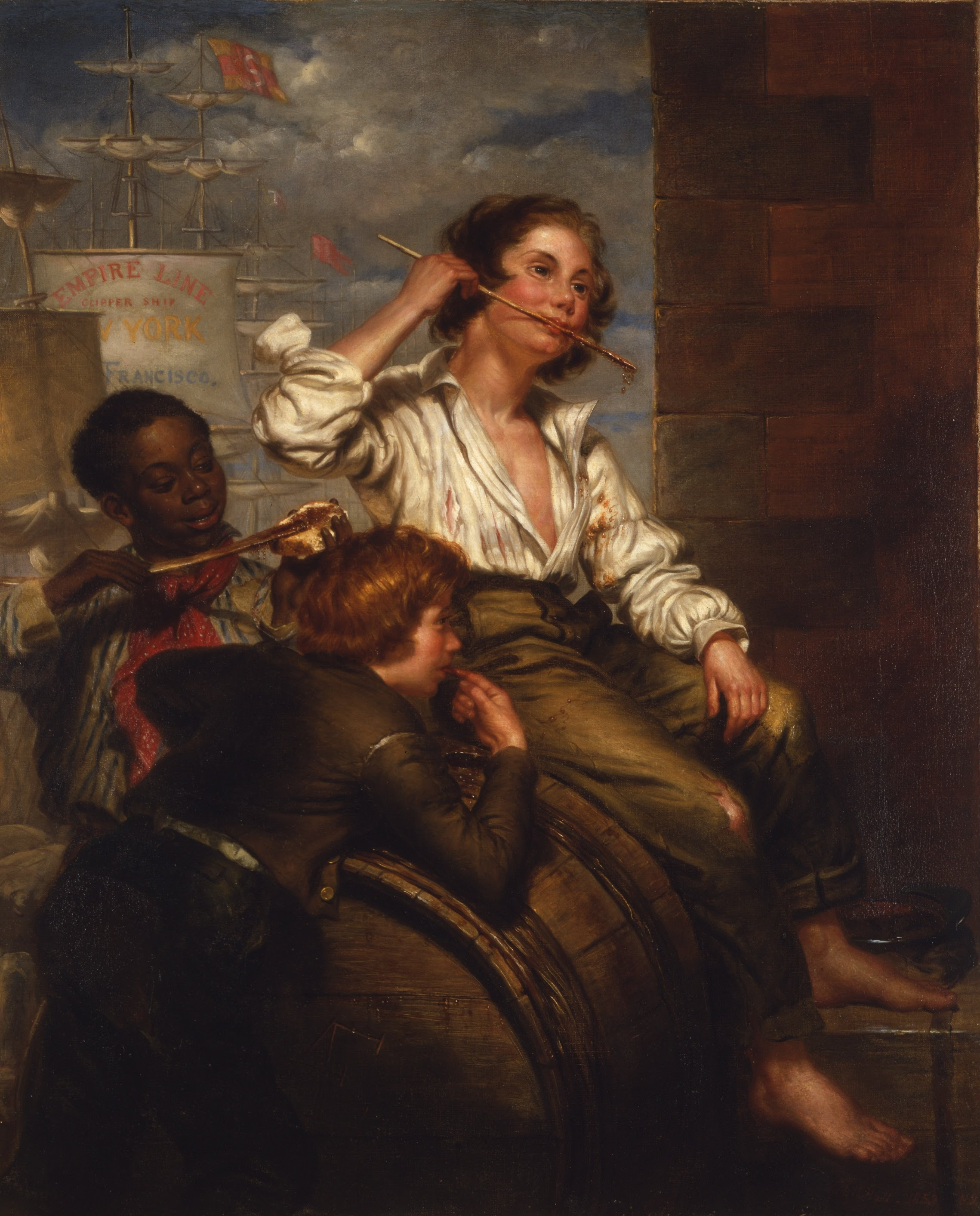
1853 painting of boys pilfering molasses from a barrel

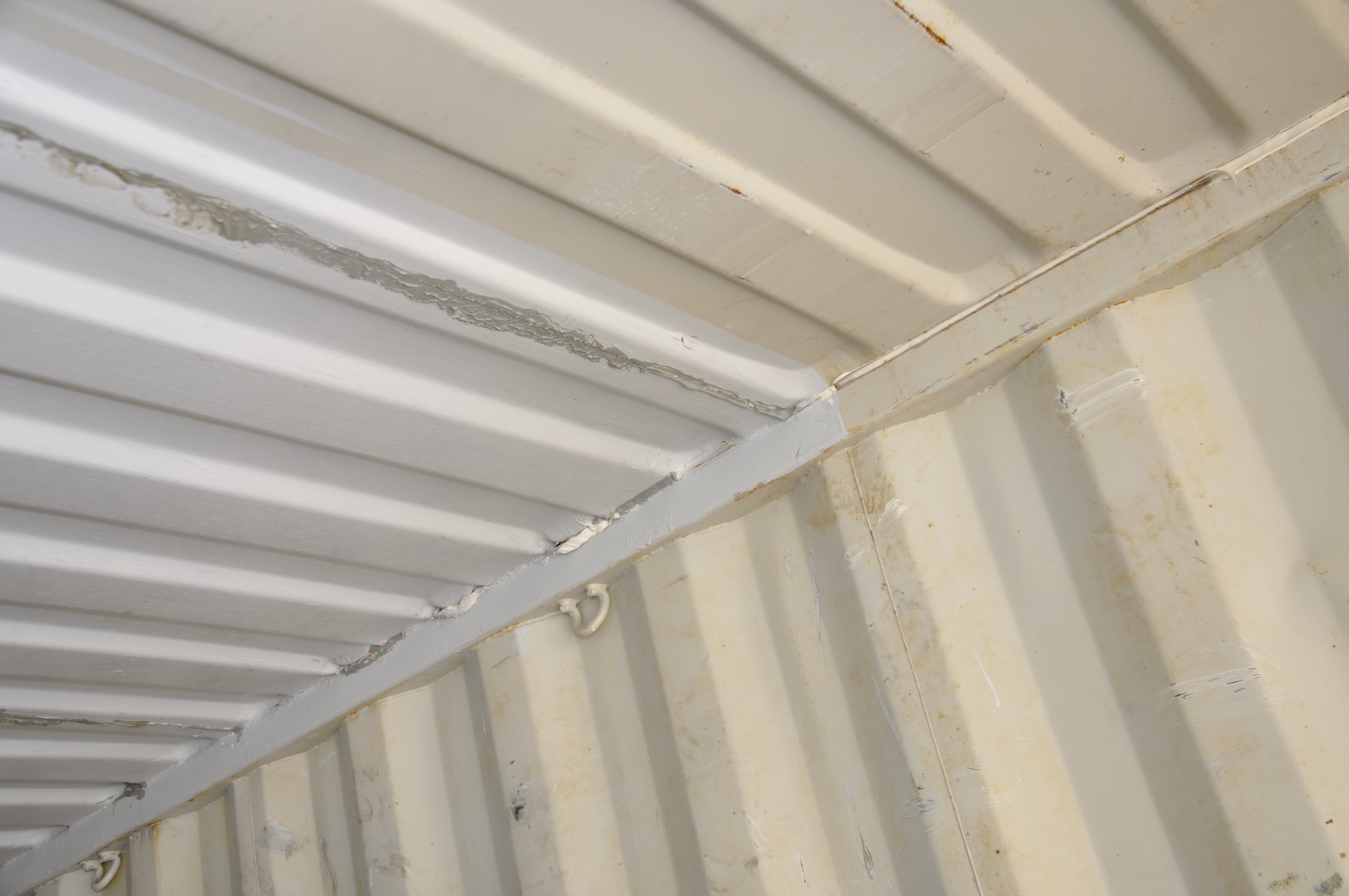
Damage to the fresh, white paint of this shipping container indicates the top was removed and replaced in order to pilfer Army medical supplies. Soldiers of the newly arrived 575th Aerial Support Medical Company discovered at Kandahar Airfield October 1, 2009, that roughly $2 million worth of their company's medical equipment had been stolen in transit.

Package pilferage is the theft of part of the contents of a package. It may also include theft of the contents but leaving the package, perhaps resealed with bogus contents. Small packages can be pilfered from a larger package such as a shipping container. Broader and related aspects of package theft may include taking the entire package, pallet load, truck load, shoplifting, etc. The theft may take place at any point in the parcel's journey from source to destination, including theft by rogue logistics employees and customs agents in international mail scenarios.

== Solutions ==
Solutions involve all phases of product production, packaging, distribution, logistics, sale, and use. No single solution is considered as "pilfer proof". Often, packaging engineers, logistics engineers, and security professionals have addressed multiple levels of security to reduce the risk of pilfering.

Each situation is unique. Some considerations have included:

- Identifying who a potential pilferer might be: an internal employee, security guard, truck driver, delivery person, receiver (consignee), organized crime, etc. Engineers usually start with knowing what level of knowledge, materials, tools, etc. might they have.
- Identifying all feasible methods of unauthorized access into a product, package, or system. In addition to the primary means of entry, engineers also consider secondary or "back door" methods.
- Identifying available means of resealing, reclosing, or replacing special seals.
- Using extra strong and secure packaging: A weak or damaged package is an invitation to pilferage.
- Considering unique custom seals and labels (changing regularly because these are subject to counterfeiting)
- Utilising mandatory package tracking scans at each stage of the shipping process to ensure the parcel is monitored for suspicious activity; both the sender and recipient can then check the status of the parcel through a track and trace system.
- Improving the pilfer resistance to make pilfering more difficult, time-consuming, etc.
- Concealing the identity and value of a pilferable item. Logistics and packaging professionals do not want to bring attention to the item, its package, addresses, names, etc.
- Adding pilfer-evident features to help indicate the existence of pilfering.
- Choosing a logistics provider who can reduce the risks of pilferage.
- Shipping in packages in unit loads with stretch wrap or in intermodal shipping containers with security seals
- Educating people to watch for evidence of pilfering.
- With a corrugated box, using a wider and stronger closure tape, 3-inch or 72 mm, reinforced gummed tape or pressure-sensitive tape.
- Using a special security tape or seal on packages that leaves a message, warning, or other indication if removed.
- Installing a surveillance system to help identify any suspects.

== See also ==
- Authentication
- Breaking bulk (law)
- Loss prevention
- Retail loss prevention
- Security bag
- Security printing
- Tamper resistance
- Tamper-evident

== Sources ==
- Soroka, W, "Fundamentals of Packaging Technology", IoPP, 2002, ISBN 1-930268-25-4
- Yam, K. L., "Encyclopedia of Packaging Technology", John Wiley & Sons, 2009, ISBN 978-0-470-08704-6
- Rosette, J. L, "Improving Tamper-Evident Packaging: Problems, Tests and Solutions", 1992
- Philip Purpura (2007). Security and Loss Prevention: An Introduction (5th ed.). Butterworth-Heinemann. ISBN 978-0-12-372525-7.
- Alan Greggo; Millie Kresevich (2009). Retail Loss Prevention: Problems and Solutions. CRC Press. ISBN 978-1-4200-9006-2.
