= Delivery (commerce) =

Process of transporting goods from a source location to a predefined destination

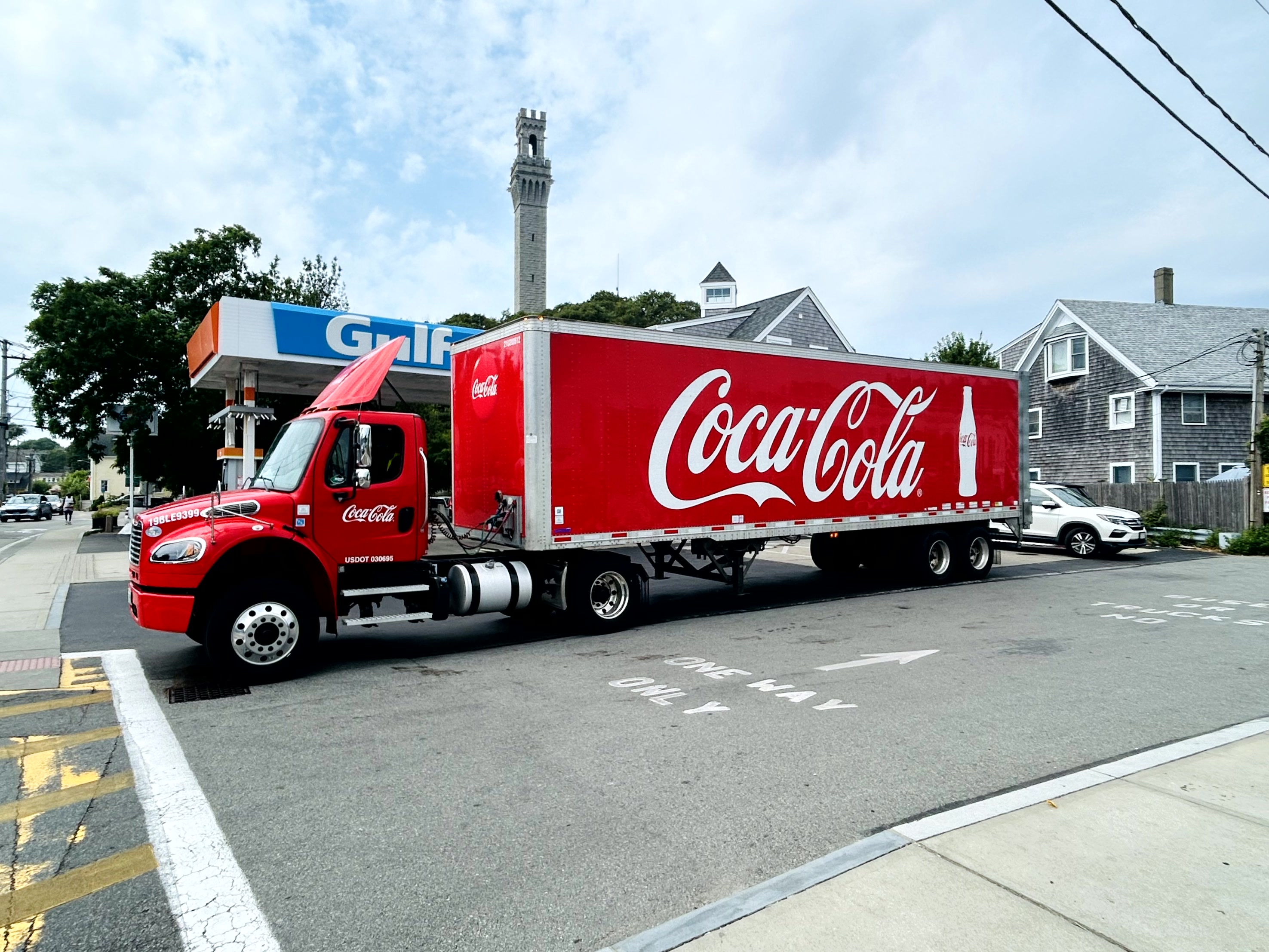
A Coca-Cola delivery truck in Provincetown, Massachusetts

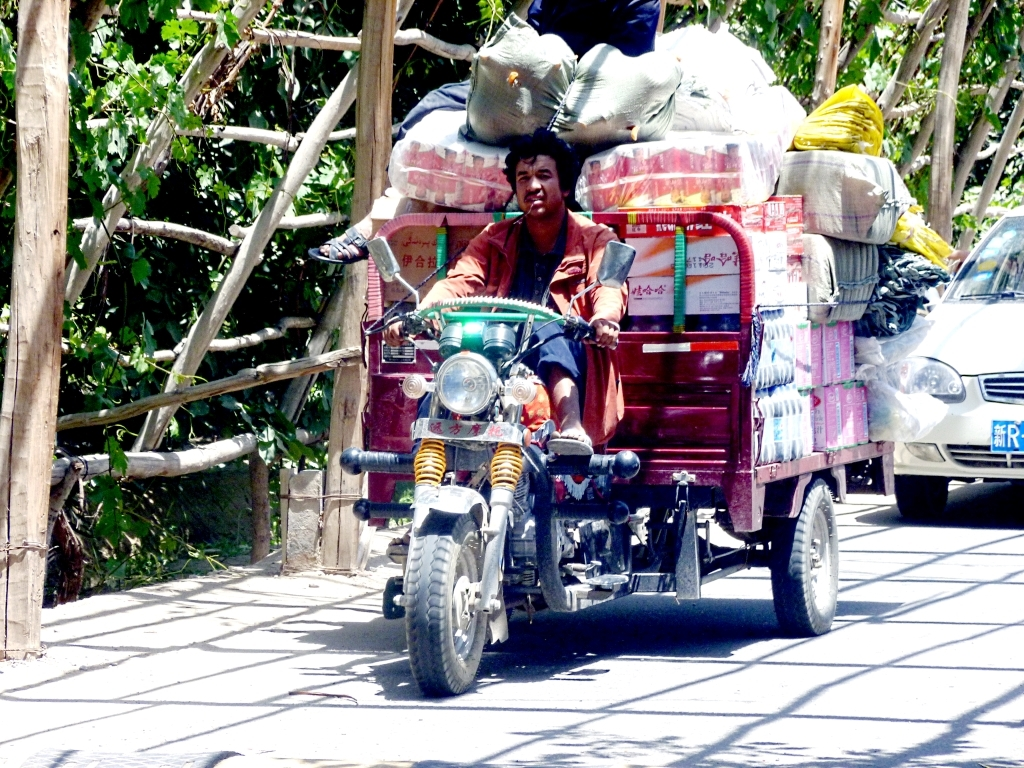
Delivery van outside Khotan, Xinjiang

Delivery is the process of transporting goods from a source location to a predefined destination. Cargo (physical goods) is primarily delivered via roads and railroads on land, shipping lanes on the sea, and airline networks in the air. Certain types of goods may be delivered via specialized networks, such as pipelines for liquid goods, power grids for electrical power and computer networks such as the Internet or broadcast networks for electronic information. Car transport is a particular subgroup; a related variant is Autorack, which involves the transport of autos by railroads.

Delivery is a fundamental component of commerce and trade, and involves transport and distribution. The general process of delivering goods is known as distribution, while the study of effective processes for delivery and disposition of goods and personnel is called logistics. Firms specializing in delivering commercial goods from the point of production or storage to their point of sale are generally known as distributors, while those that specialize in the delivery of goods to the consumer are known as delivery services. Postal, courier, and relocation services also deliver goods for commercial and private interests.

== Consumer goods delivery ==
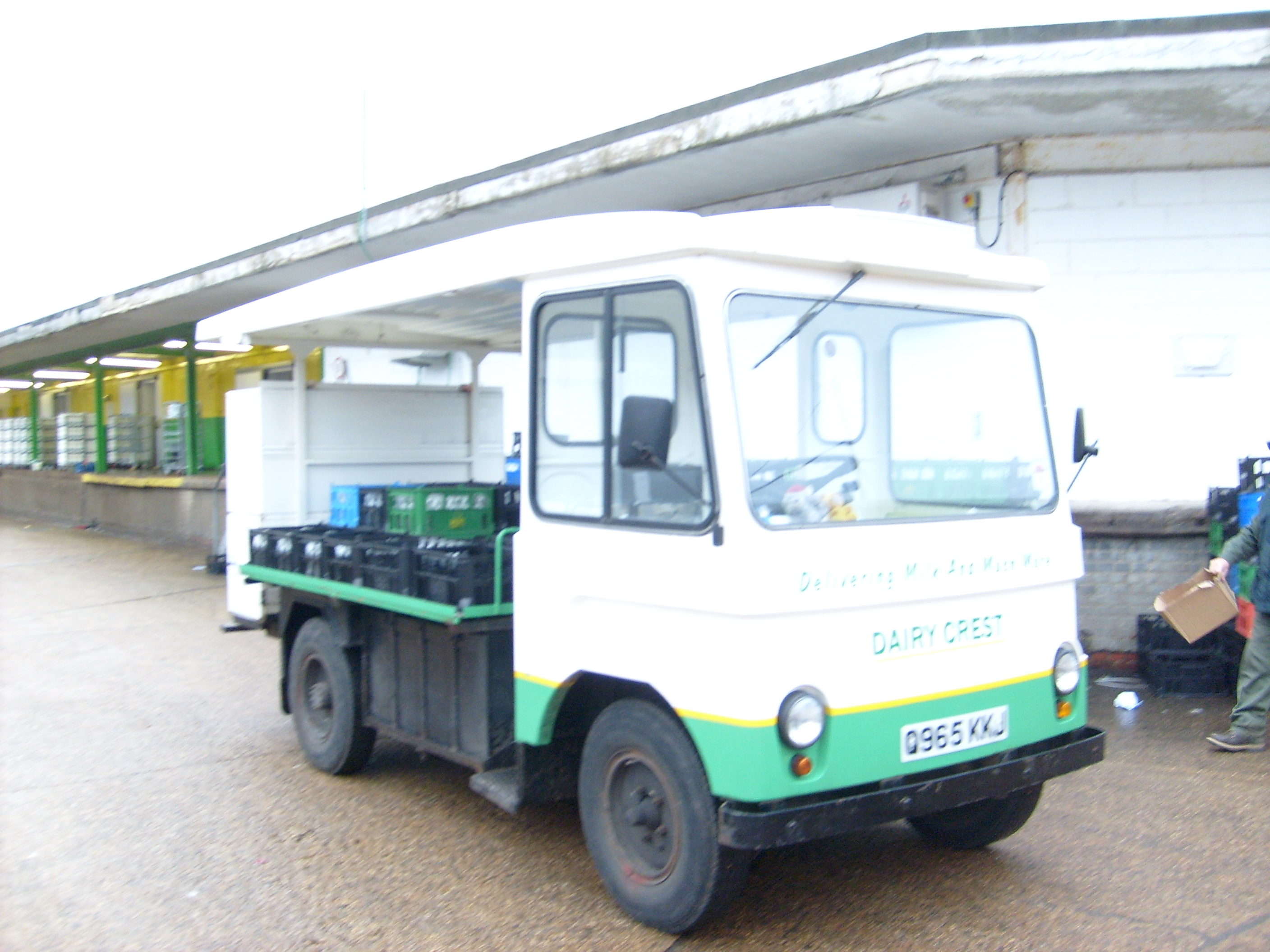
A Dairy Crest Smiths Elizabethan electric Milk float used to deliver fresh milk to people's doorsteps

Most consumer goods are delivered from a point of production (such as a factory or farm) through one or more points of storage (warehouses) to a point of sale (such as retail stores or online vendors), where the consumer buys the good and is responsible for its transportation to point of consumption. There are many variations on this model for specific types of goods and modes of sale. Products sold via catalogue or the Internet may be delivered directly from the manufacturer or warehouse to the consumer's home, or to an automated delivery booth. Small manufacturers may deliver their products directly to retail stores without warehousing.

Some manufacturers maintain factory outlets which serve as both points of storage and points of sale, selling products directly to consumers at wholesale prices, although many retail stores falsely advertise as factory outlets. Building, construction, landscaping and like materials are generally delivered to the consumer by a contractor as part of another service. Some highly perishable or hazardous goods, such as radioisotopes used in medical imaging, are delivered directly from manufacturer to consumer.

Home delivery is often available for fast food and other convenience products, e.g. pizza delivery. Sometimes home delivery of supermarket goods is possible. A milk float is a small battery electric vehicle (BEV), specifically designed for the delivery of fresh milk. A new form of delivery is emerging on the horizon of the internet age: delivery by the crowd. In this concept, an individual not necessarily contracted by the vendor performs the delivery of goods to the destination. Sometimes, private courier companies will also deliver consumer goods on a regular basis for companies like E-commerce businesses. In the 2010s and 2020s, a number of companies started using gig workers driving their own vehicles rather than permanent employees driving company vehicles to make deliveries of groceries, food, and general retail items. Drivers typically sign up and get work assignments using a smartphone app. Arrangements range from producers and deliveries made by separate companies (such as with Uber Eats, DoorDash and GrubHub) to in-house deliveries only (such as Amazon Flex, although Amazon also uses contracted delivery companies in Amazon-branded vehicles), to a mixture (such as Walmart Spark, which delivers both Walmart and third-party products).

== Delivery vehicles ==
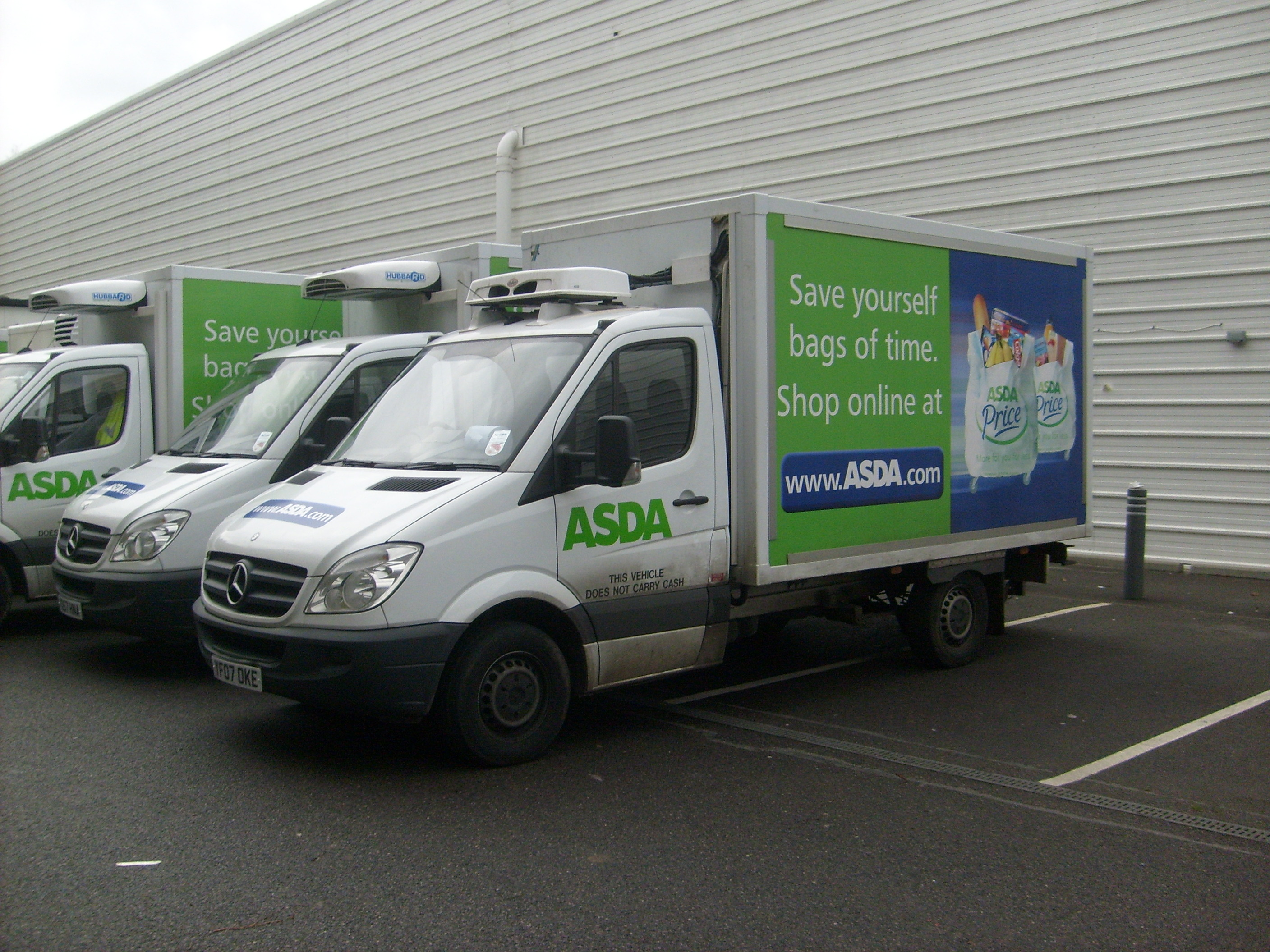
Asda Mercedes-Benz Sprinter vans for delivering groceries to customers' doors

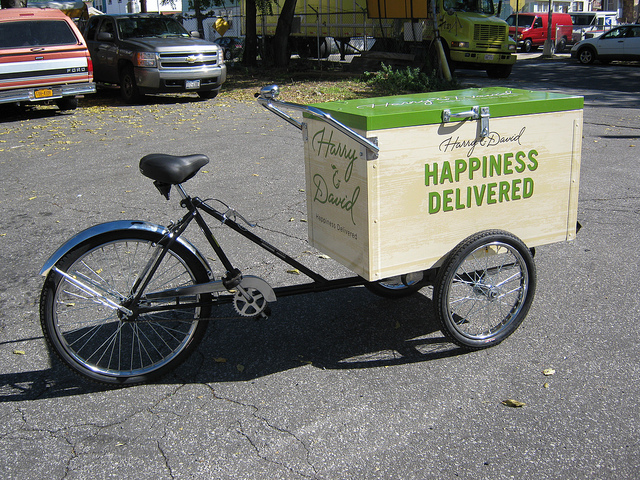
Delivery tricycle

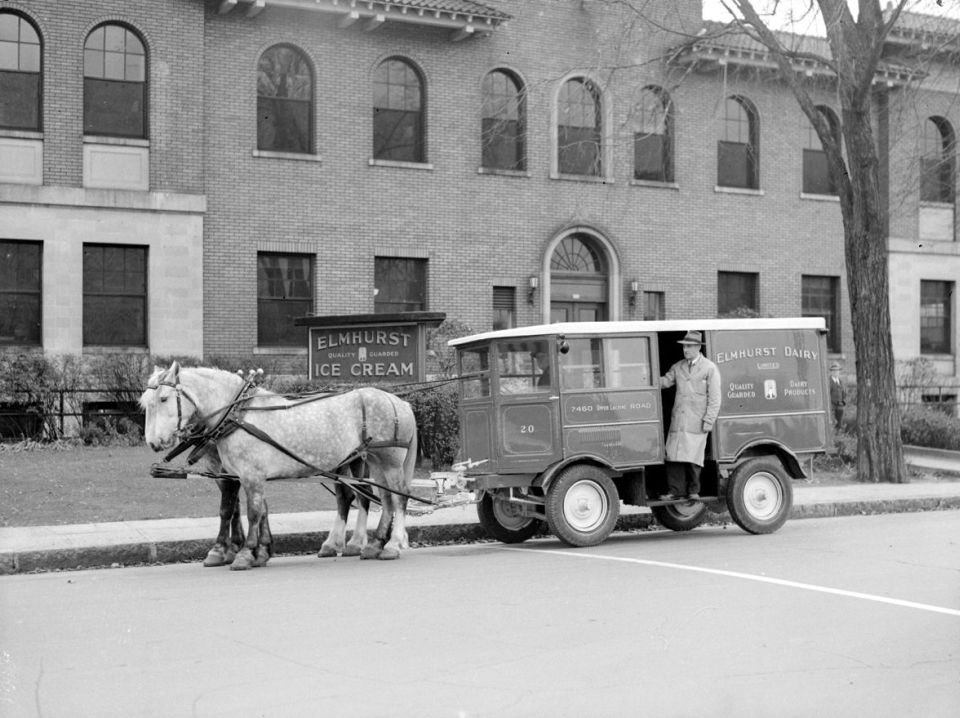
A horse-drawn dairy delivery vehicle in Montreal, Quebec, Canada in 1942

The consumer demand for supermarkets to deliver to their door created the need for a mixed temperature controlled vehicle on 3.5T chassis. These vehicle bodies were initially built with the traditional GRP sandwich panels but as more damage resistant lightweight materials with better insulation properties have become available companies have been developing Advanced Home Delivery Vehicles. The 2012 Commercial Vehicle Show in the UK saw the new JDC PolyBilt design, one of the latest of these "Plastic" bodies that can be recycled at the end of its service life, unlike the traditional GRP which ends up as landfill.

Vehicles are often specialized to deliver different types of goods. On land, semi-trailers are outfitted with various trailers such as box trailers, flatbeds, car carriers and other specialized trailers, while railroad trains include similarly specialized cars. Armored cars, dump trucks and concrete mixers are examples of vehicles specialized for delivery of specific types of goods. On the sea, merchant ships come in various forms, such as cargo ships, oil tankers and fishing boats. Freight aircraft are used to deliver cargo.

Often, passenger vehicles are used for delivery of goods. These include buses, vans, pick-ups, cars (e.g., for mail or pizza delivery), motorcycles and bicycles (e.g., for newspaper delivery). A significant amount of freight is carried in the cargo holds of passenger ships and aircraft. Everyday travelers, known as a casual courier, can also be used to deliver goods. Delivery to remote, primitive or inhospitable areas may be accomplished using small aircraft, snowmobiles, horse-drawn vehicles, dog sleds, pack animals, on foot, or by a variety of other transport methods.

New methods of delivery, such as delivery robots and delivery drones, have been introduced. Larger firms including Amazon, Google, and FedEx have been investing in using delivery drones that are capable of carrying light packages across short distances. Such firms may also use a Delivery Driver App to plan efficient routes to help ensure they deliver items on time.

== Scheduled deliveries ==
Some products are delivered to consumers on a periodic schedule. Historically, home delivery of many goods was much more common in urban centres of the developed world. At the beginning of the 20th century, perishable farm items such as milk, eggs and ice, were delivered weekly or even daily to customers by local farms. Milkmen delivered milk and other farm produce. With the advent of home refrigeration and better distribution methods, these products are today largely delivered through the same retail distribution systems as other food products. Icemen delivered ice for iceboxes until home refrigerators rendered them obsolete. Similarly, laundry was once picked up and washed at a commercial laundry before being delivered to middle-class homes until the appearance of the washing machine and dryer. (The lower classes washed their own clothes and the upper classes had live-in servants.) Likewise deliveries of coal and wood for home heating were common until they were replaced in many areas by natural gas, oil, or electric heating. Some products, most notably home heating oil, are still delivered periodically. Human blood may be delivered to hospitals on a periodic schedule. Milk delivery continued until the mid-twentieth century across North America. For example, the last milk delivery by horse-and-wagon in Edmonton was in 1961.

== See also ==
- Breaking bulk (law)
- Conversion van
- Cutaway van chassis
- Cyclologistics
- Mail order
- Multi-stop truck
- Online food ordering
- Package delivery
- Shipping
- Category:Shopping delivery services
