= Real evidence =

Any material object relevant to the facts in a judicial proceeding

In evidence law, physical evidence (also called real evidence or material evidence) is any material object that plays some role in the matter that gave rise to the litigation, introduced as evidence in a judicial proceeding (such as a trial) to prove a fact in issue based on the object's physical characteristics.

== In American law ==
=== Tampering ===
It is an offense at common law "to tamper with, conceal, or destroy evidence knowing that it may be wanted in a judicial proceeding or is being sought by law enforcement officers." This is also a crime under statutes of many U.S. states. A 2004 review found that 32 states had a statute "that prohibits, in some form, the concealment, destruction, or tampering with evidence." Evidence tampering "generally refers to physical evidence and is not founded on false statements or the concealment of information by false statements." It falls within the broader set of obstruction of justice-related offenses; others include perjury, bribery, destruction of government property, contempt, and escape.

Generally, the elements of the offense are: that the person had "knowledge that an official proceeding or investigation is in progress or is likely to be instituted"; that the person took (2) "overt action to alter, destroy, conceal, or remove evidence"; and that (3) the person had the "purpose of impairing the value or availability of the evidence in the proceeding or investigation."

=== Self-incrimination ===
In Pennsylvania v. Muniz (1990), the U.S. Supreme Court "distinguished 'physical' and 'demeanor' evidence from 'testimonial' evidence, holding that evidence of the former does not engender Fifth Amendment protection" against self-incrimination. The U.S. Court of Appeals for the Ninth Circuit has held that "physical evidence includes one's fingerprints, handwriting, vocal characteristics, stance, stride, gestures, or blood characteristics."

== See also ==
- Chain of custody
- Forensic science
- DNA fingerprinting
- Authentication
- Documentary evidence
- Evidence packaging
