= Tampering with evidence =

Crime consisting of damaging evidence

There are many ways to tamper with evidence, including burning.

Tampering with evidence, or evidence tampering, is an act in which a person alters, conceals, falsifies, or destroys evidence with the intent to interfere with an investigation (usually) by a law-enforcement, governmental, or regulatory authority. It is a criminal offense in many jurisdictions.

Tampering with evidence is closely related to the legal issue of spoliation of evidence, which is usually the civil law or due process version of the same concept (but may itself be a crime). Tampering with evidence is also closely related to obstruction of justice and perverting the course of justice, and these two kinds of crimes are often charged together. The goal of tampering with evidence is usually to cover up a crime or with intent to injure the accused person.

== Spoliation ==
Spoliation of evidence is the intentional, reckless, or negligent withholding, hiding, altering, fabricating, or destroying of evidence relevant to a legal proceeding. Historically, it has also sometimes been referred to as the spoilage of evidence.

The spoliation inference is a negative evidentiary inference that a trier of fact can draw from a party's destruction of evidence that is relevant to an ongoing or reasonably foreseeable civil or criminal proceeding: the finder of fact can review all evidence uncovered in as strong a light as possible against the spoliator and in favor of the opposing party.

However, in U.S. federal courts, updates to the Federal Rules of Civil Procedure in 2015 have resulted in significant decline in spoliation sanctions.

A person can be accused of spoliation of evidence if a legal case is pending or reasonably anticipated. The defendant does not need to have received an order to preserve evidence. However, lawyers often send out such notices to put the other party on notice and to reduce plausible deniability.

=== Theory ===
The theory of the spoliation inference is that when a party destroys evidence, it may be reasonable to infer that the party had "consciousness of guilt" or other motivation to avoid the evidence. Therefore, the fact-finder may conclude that the evidence would have been unfavorable to the spoliator. Some jurisdictions have recognized a spoliation tort action, which allows the victim of destruction of evidence to file a separate tort action against a spoliator.

== By law enforcement ==
When police confiscate or destroy a citizen's photographs or recordings of officers' misconduct, the police's act of destroying the evidence may be prosecuted as an act of evidence tampering, if the recordings being destroyed are potential evidence in a criminal or regulatory investigation of the officers themselves.

== Legal consequences ==
Penalties for evidence tampering vary by jurisdiction and are determined by the applicable laws and the circumstances of the offense. In many jurisdictions, evidence tampering is a criminal offense punishable by fines, probation, or imprisonment. Sentences may be enhanced when the offense is committed in connection with a serious criminal offense or an ongoing criminal investigation. The severity of the penalty generally depends on factors such as the nature of the underlying offense, the intent of the accused, and the extent to which the act interfered with the administration of justice.

== Examples of evidence spoliation ==
- Enron scandal, and the Arthur Andersen LLP v. United States case
- Iran–Contra affair, and Fawn Hall's role
- The Metropolitan Police file-shredding
- Conrad Black's removal of 13 sealed evidence boxes from his office during a trial
- CIA Director Richard Helms' order to destroy MKUltra files

== See also ==
- Contempt of court
- Consciousness of guilt
- Cover-up
- Discovery (law)
  - E-discovery
- Evidence packaging
- Spoliation in fire investigation
- Illegal disposal of bodies in the water
- Legal hold
- Obstruction of justice
- Perverting the course of justice
- Police misconduct
- Security bag
