= Evidence packaging =

Specialized packaging for physical evidence

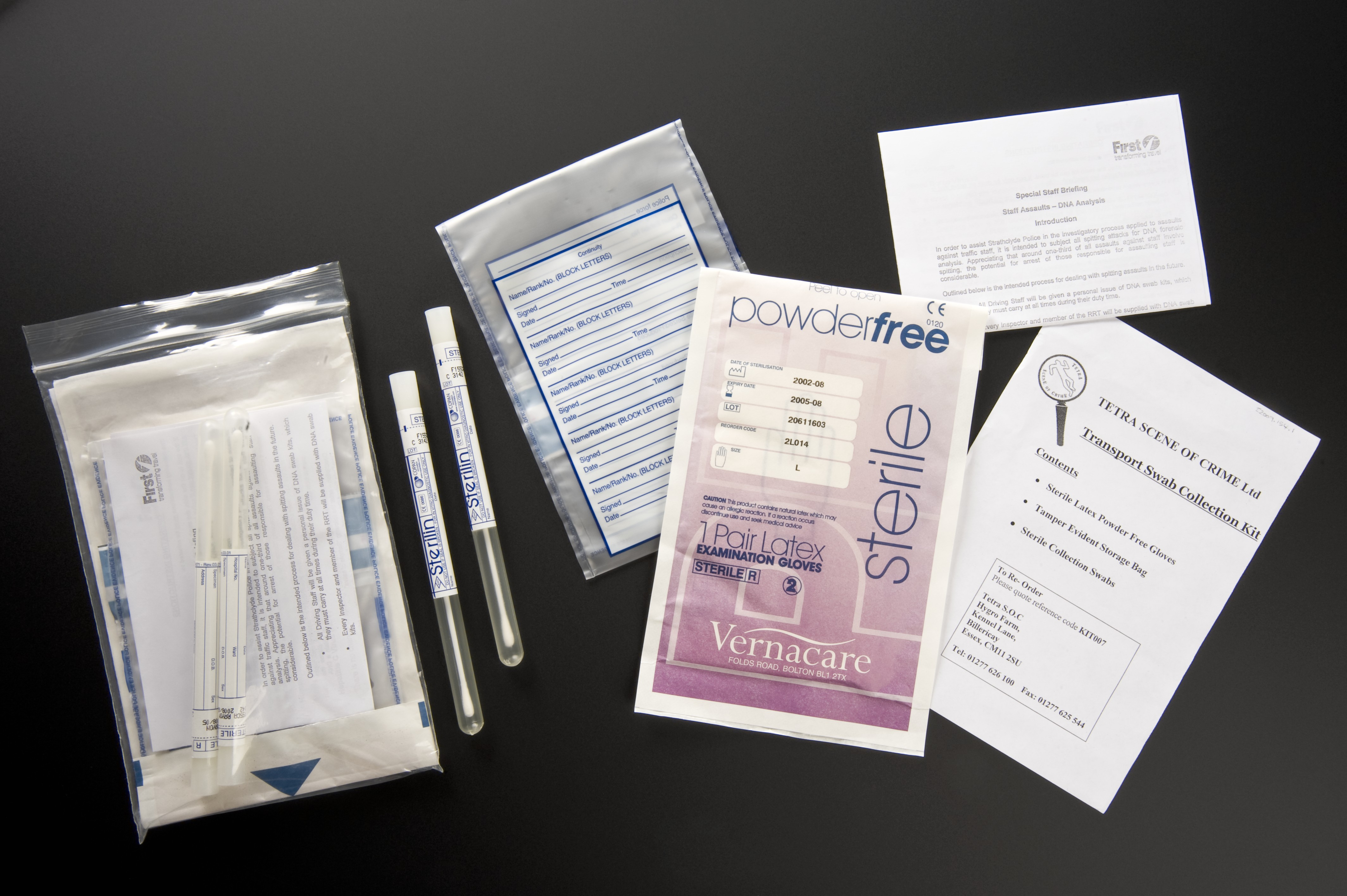
DNA swab kit with containers

Sexual assault kit

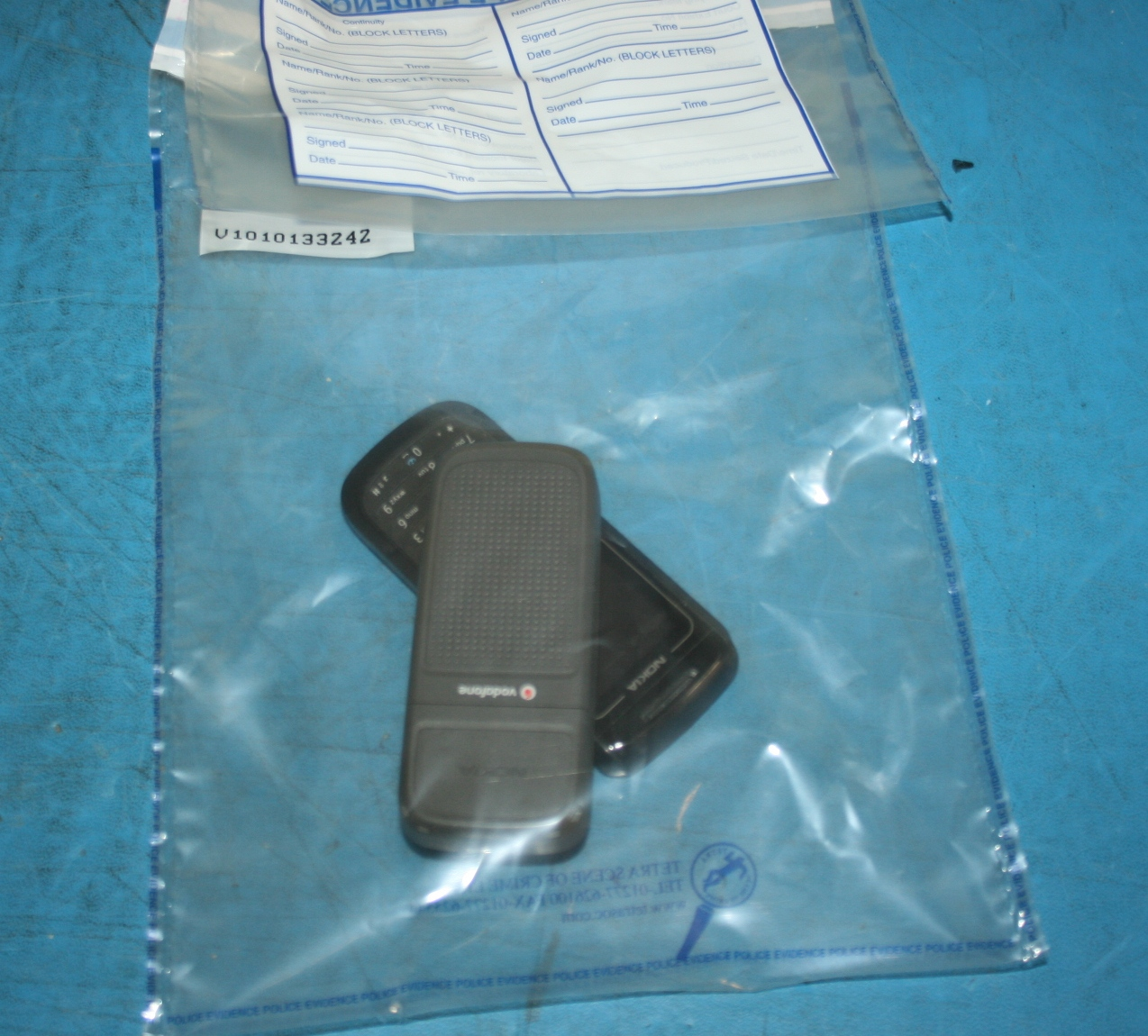
Two mobile phones in a security bag or evidence bag. Faraday bags have Electromagnetic shielding to prevent electronic access to contents.

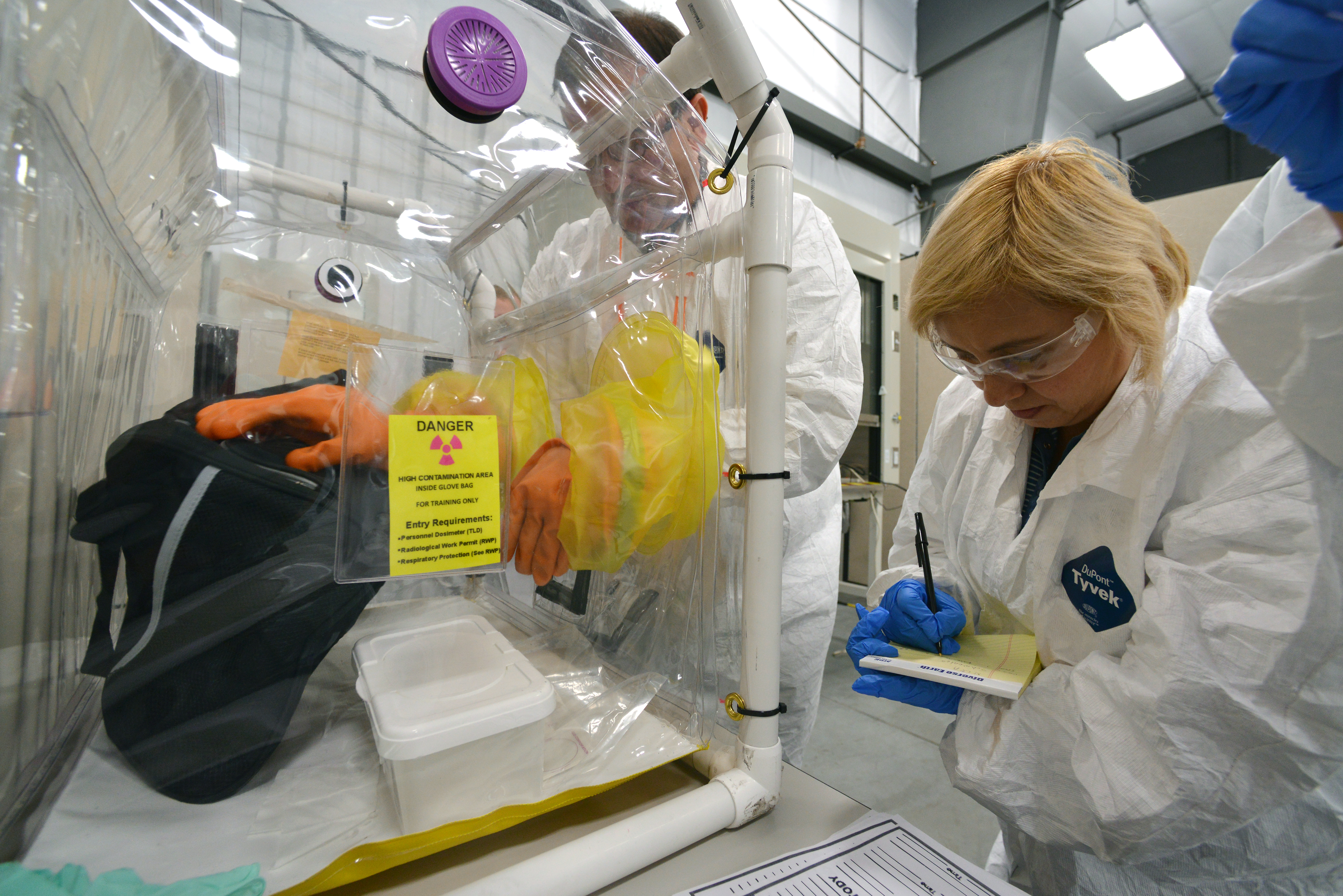
A package of radioactive material from a crime scene comes into an IAEA lab and is unpacked in a glove box. Participants take detailed notes of each stage of the unpacking.

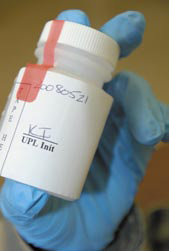
Drug test specimen bottle: Frangible security label detects tampering or altering of the specimen.

Evidence packaging involves the specialized packaging methods and materials used for physical evidence. Items need to be collected at a crime scene or a fire scene, forwarded to a laboratory for forensic analysis, put in secure storage, and used in a courtroom, all while maintaining the chain of custody. Items might include DNA, drugs, hair samples, body parts, blood samples, sperm, knives, vomit, firearms, bullets, fire accelerants, computers, checkbooks, etc.

Each police or fire jurisdiction has its own policies and procedures for evidence collection and handling. Legal requirements for admissible evidence to a court also vary from region to region. Many commonalities do exist.

== Physical containment and protection ==
Packaging should be the proper size, type, and material for the item. Many items are suited to a clean paper bag sealed with a security tape. Many jurisdictions desire one item per container, but situations do vary. Clean zipper storage bags are also used: special security bags or “evidence bags” have built-in security and tamper-indicating features.

Knives are best suited to packing in corrugated boxes so the blade does not cut the package or people. Empty firearms are often attached to a corrugated box by cable ties.

Salvage drums are available in various sizes to contain potentially hazardous liquids.

When detection of fire accelerants is needed for evidence from a fire investigation, the package must be a vapor barrier. Sometimes a glass jar such as a mason jar is used. Heat sealable nylon plastic bags have also been shown to be effective.

== Contamination ==
Control is needed to prevent contamination of the evidence: investigators to the evidence, scene to scene, evidence to evidence, etc.

== Dangerous evidence ==
Particular care is needed when packaging material classified as dangerous goods (Hazardous materials) and with items possibly qualifying as hazardous waste or biomedical waste. This might include: drugs, explosives, loaded firearms, ammunition, etiologic agents, flammables, radioactives, etc.

Local specialists often transport items to a local laboratory for analysis or to an approved storage facility. When items are shipped (particularly by common carrier), strict regulations govern the construction, preparation, and labeling of shipping containers. Compliance with the regulations starts with the proper classification of the material to be shipped: chemical composition, flash point of liquid, degree of hazard, etc. This is not always known for suspect materials at the scene of a crime. Sandia National Laboratories has prepared a review of packaging types for consideration of shipping hazardous evidence.

== Identification ==
Individual packs and collections of items in a larger container need to be labeled: description, source, preliminary comments, special handling needs, etc.

Chain of custody labels with authenticated signatures are often required. Gaps in documented custody make submission to a court more difficult.

== Security ==
The physical security of packaged items is critical. The items cannot be damaged or degraded in transit or storage. The risk of theft, pilferage, tampering, adulteration, etc. must be tightly controlled.

Packaging is not to be considered as "tamper proof"; it is only one component of an evidence management system. No one security feature can be considered as "tamper proof". Most security products can be foiled by a knowledgeable person with sufficient time and with access to specialized tools, solvents, extreme temperatures, other security bags, other security tapes, etc.

== See also ==
- Fire investigation
- Criminal investigation
- Forensic firearm examination
- DNA collection
- Bindle
