= Security seal =

Device used to show whether a locking device has been opened

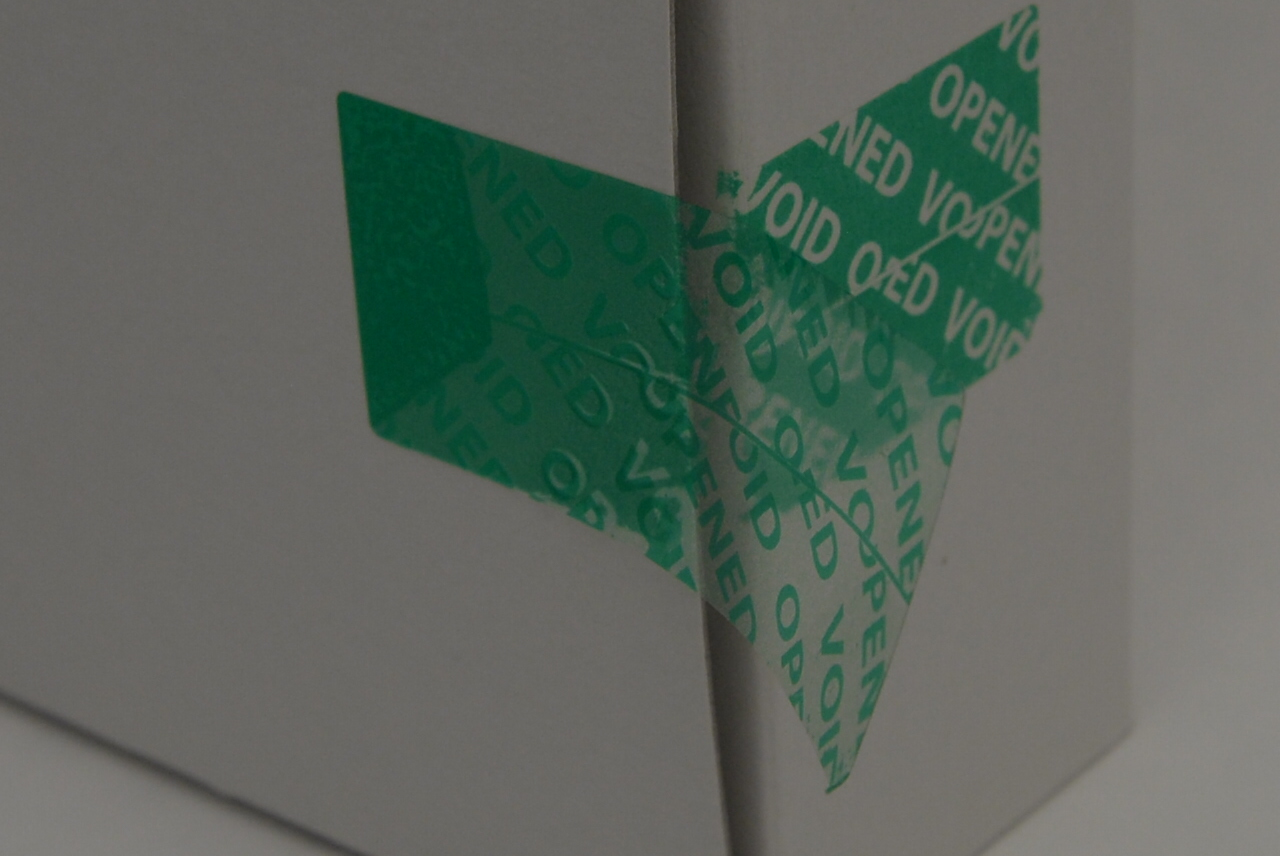
Flexible tamper evident seals deliver an instant, additional layer of security

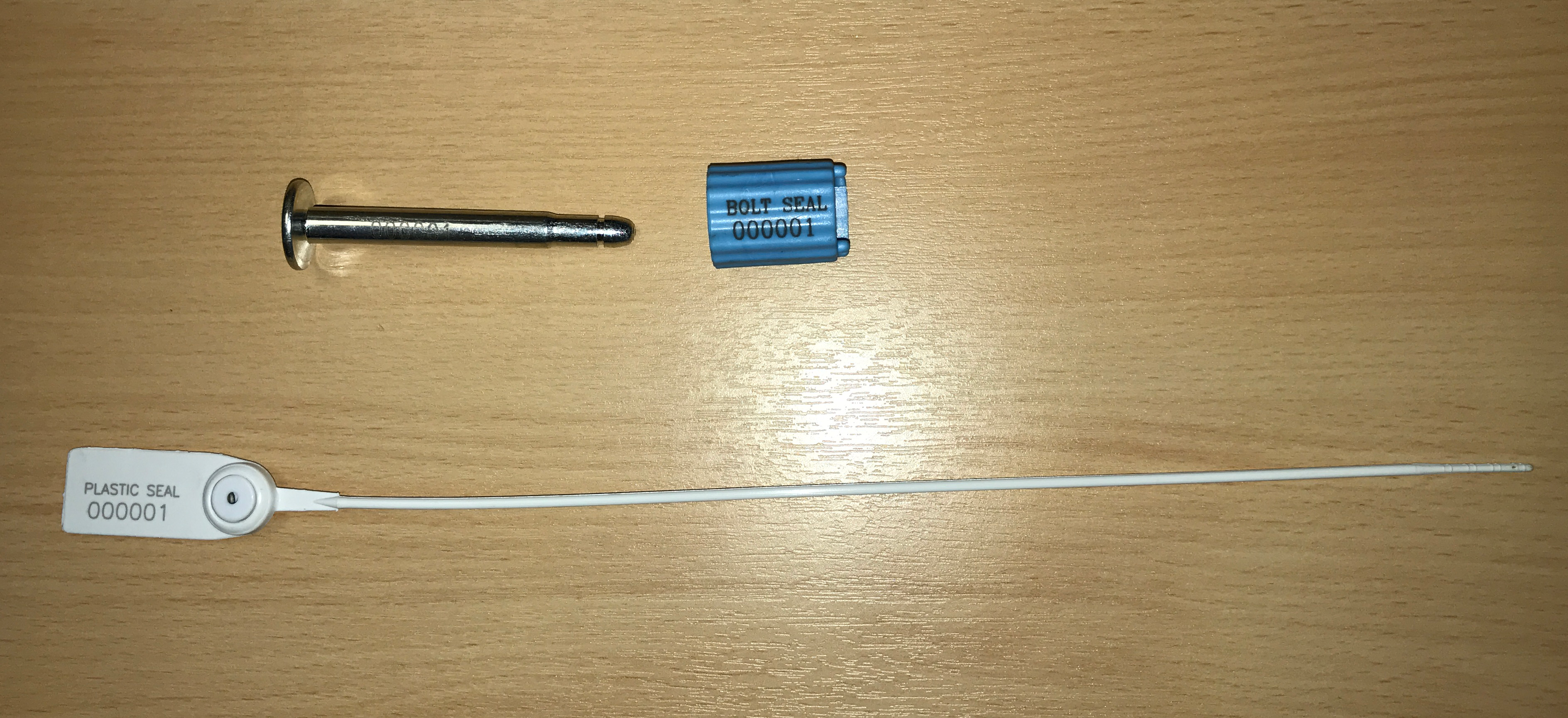
A basic metal bolt seal and a basic plastic security seal

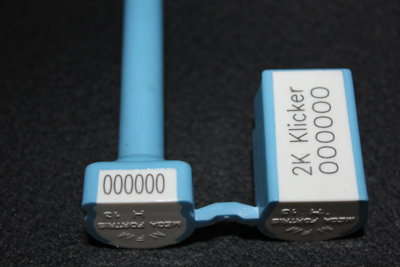
High Security Bolt Seal.

Security seals are tamper-evident mechanisms that seal valuable material in a room, cabinet, vehicle, or other storage facility. One common use is to seal cargo in transit shipping containers in a way that provides tamper evidence and some level of rudimentary security. Such seals can help to detect theft or contamination, either accidental or deliberate. Security seals are commonly used to secure truck trailers, vessel containers, chemical drums, airline duty-free trolleys, keys and utility meters. Typically they are considered an inexpensive way of providing tamper evidence of intrusion into sensitive spaces.

== Vulnerabilities ==
Security seals are not designed to resolve all security problems:

The effectiveness of seals is strongly dependent on the proper protocols for using them. These protocols are the official and unofficial procedures used for seal procurement, storage, record keeping, installation, inspection, removal, disposal, reporting, interpreting findings, and training. With a good protocol, a modest seal can provide excellent security. On the other hand, a sophisticated seal used poorly may be worse than useless if naively trusted.

— Vulnerability Assessment Team at Argonne National Laboratory,

The same organization demonstrated that a trained individual was able, using low-tech methods, to defeat 90% of the 244 seals they studied in less than 3 minutes, and all of them in less than 44 minutes. They offer ideas on countermeasures, and are exploring the promising option of "anti-evidence" seals.

== Operation ==
Security seals can be split into two main groups: single-use and reusable. Single-use seals are typically made of plastic or metal, and the used material and production technology is the key to their security level. Reusable seals are usually electronic or mechanical rather than just made from plastic, and if purely plastic, only one part is reusable. Electronic and mechanical seals are generally used for the transportation industry, with seal fixed to the back of trucks, trailers, and shipping containers. A reusable mechanical or electronic seal can be fitted to the rear or loading doors, extending a cable from itself through fixing points on the doors, and when sealed generating a unique number which is logged. When the door is next opened this number changes, so it provides tamper evidence for the load.

=== High Security Seals ===
A High Security Seal is constructed and manufactured of material such as metal or metal cable with the intent to delay intrusion and have been designed to conform with world customs and ISO security seal standards. The International Standards Organization (ISO) published the new version of ISO 17712 on 15 May 2013. The major changes in the new edition concern Clause 6, Evidence of Tampering. Changes were required due to the demonstrated impracticality of tamper-related tests in ISO 17712:2010 edition.

A measure of a seal's security is whether it has obtained an ISO 17712:2013 rating. US Customs-Trade Partnership Against Terrorism (C-TPAT) and the World Customs Organization's Framework of standards, endorsed and encouraged the use of ISO compliant seals.

The requirements for certain security level of seals are defined in the ISO 17712. The seals that belong to the High security level and Security level are also called "barrier seals". They are made of different metals or metal alloys, meaning that they require special tools to be opened, such as bolt cutters or pliers. Cable seals and bolt seals also fall into this category. Designed to deter opportunistic theft of high value goods, they also can often be branded and numbered to improve tamper resistance and provide excellent security for containers. The seals that are in the Indicative level as to ISO 17712 are made of plastic or thin metal.

Security Seal Manufacturers have worked alongside ISO Security Auditors to provide the following information to help inform businesses and other interested parties about the new edition.

=== (HMRC) Customs Accepted Seals ===
Customs accepted seals are security seals which the customs department of a given country will accept as a secure seal to be placed onto a container. This does not mean that all exporters or importers should place a customs accepted seal on their containers or trailers. Many businesses who transport high value goods like to use Customs Accepted Seals as these seals have been through rigorous testing and are of high quality.

The UK Security Seal Testing Authority tests these seals on various points such as "Tensile Strength", "Effects of Heat", "Direct Effects of Freezing", "Effective Numbering & Marking", "Tamper Evidence", and more.

UK Customs Accepted seals are sorted into three various categories, Group 1 consists of seals which withstand a force of 1000 kg, Group 2 consists of seals which withstand a force of 250 kg and Group 3 consists of other accepted seals. View all UK customs accepted seals here.

== Metal seals ==
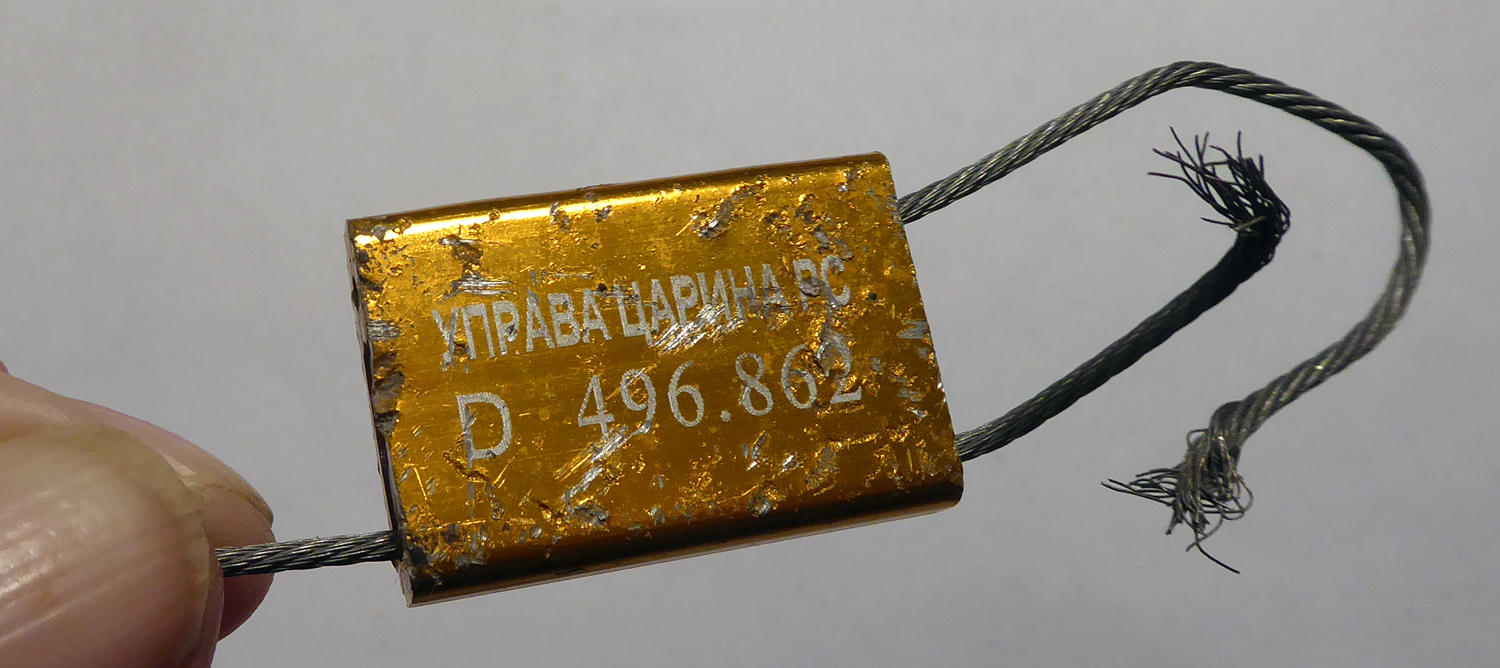
A Russian seal for sealing truck compartments

There are several basic designs of the metal seals; bolt seals, ball seals, and cable seals.

Bolt seals are used to secure shipping containers, trucks, and trailers. A bolt seal used for securing containers must conform to the ISO 17712 high security seal in order to be accepted by customs all around the world in ocean shipping. The C-TPAT (Customs Trade Partnership Against Terrorism) specifies ISO 17712 compliant security seals to be used. Bolt seals are generally closed by hand (by pushing the seal body and head together) and opened with the use of bolt cutters. This gives a strong and secure seal for transportation, while remaining convenient for staff in ports and warehouses.

=== Cable seals ===
Cable seals allow for more versatile application, as they have variable length of the locking mechanism limited only by the cable length. Typical applications include sealing trucks and railway cars transporting valuable commodities. An internal locking mechanism prevents the cable from being retracted. Most cable seals are classified as security or high security level as to ISO 17712.

All ISO 17712 compliant seals are numbered on both seal body and head, to prevent substitution of either part. This is usually done using laser marking, which cannot be rubbed off.

Ball seals are commonly used for securing trucks. They consist of a metal strip with a punched hole, attached to a housing section. When the strip is bent and threaded through the hole, a ball inside the housing section locks it in place. Most ball type seals belong only to the indicative level as to ISO 17712.

== Plastic seals ==
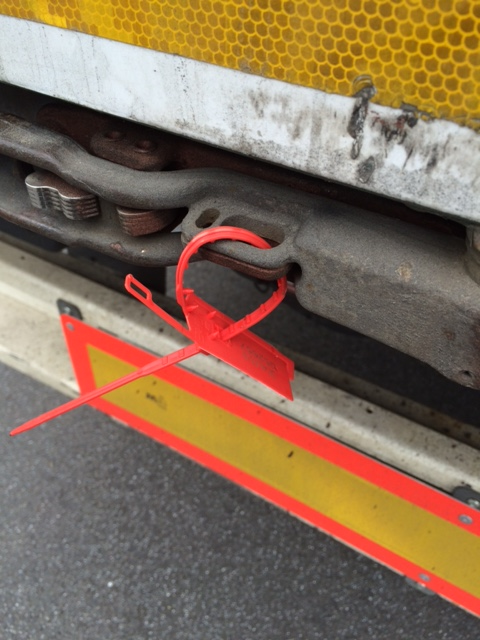
A cable tie with an in-built security tag

Plastic security seals are manufactured normally in two styles; adjustable or fixed-length. Adjustable-length seals can fit many applications from securing the neck of a bag or mail sack to sealing chemical drums, first aid kits, and fire extinguishers. They have an adjustable length much like a cable seal but offer a much higher security level and an audit trail due to sequential numbering and the ability on some seals to be bar-coded and have a company name and logo printed or laser etched on.

Fixed-length seals tend to be more tamper resistant than variable-length as there are no sliding parts, they simply "click" into place to lock, which can make them easier to fit than variable-length seals. Most fixed-length seals can also be branded and numbered for extra security. Fixed-length is often the choice of single-use security seals for transport applications.

Padlock seals are usually supplied as a completely plastic seal, shaped as a standard padlock would be. Technically, they can be classed as a fixed-length seal. They feature the same types of tamper-evident protection as variable-length and fixed-length have available - numbering, bar-coding, and branding - but fit some different applications. The most common use for these seals is for airline duty-free trolleys. One reason for this is that plastic padlocks can be placed over a locking part as any metal padlock would be to secure, but do not require keys to open, they simply break off at their built in break point using hands or a small pair of wire cutters. They are secure due to the audit trail available as a result of the sequential numbering.

Meter seals are used with electric or gas or water meters and usually molded in polycarbonate. The transparent body of the seal means that the locking mechanism is visible, and can provide clear indication of tampering. Meter seals can withstand exposure to sunlight and extreme weather, and a wide range of temperatures. Designed for only a single use, they are destroyed when removed. Some meter seals contain components which glow under ultraviolet light, allowing the seal to be easily located in darkness.

Special security tapes and labels have high bond-strength adhesives in combination with backing that are designed to fracture or delaminate under designated conditions to indicate premature attempts at opening. Custom printing, holograms, and security printing often assist in deterring and indicating tampering.

== Technologies for marking the seals ==
The seals can be individualized to fit the needs of the user. Typical marking includes logos, special texts, white pads for writing by hand, consecutive numbering, and 1D and 2D bar codes. Several marking technologies are in use, including hot stamping, inkjet printing, laser engraving, and thermal printing.

== C-TPAT ==
The Customs-Trade Partnership Against Terrorism (C-TPAT) is a voluntary supply chain security program led by U.S. Customs and Border Protection (CBP) and focused on improving the security of private companies' supply chains with respect to terrorism. The program was launched in November 2001 with seven initial participants, all large U.S. companies. Large-scale Security Seal producers were included within the "invited foreign manufacturers" segment of the ordinance. C-TPAT-compliant security ties indicate they are compliant with international shipping security standards.

== See also ==
- Package pilferage
- Security bag
- Tamper-evident technology
