= Security bag =

Bag for valuable or legally sensitive items

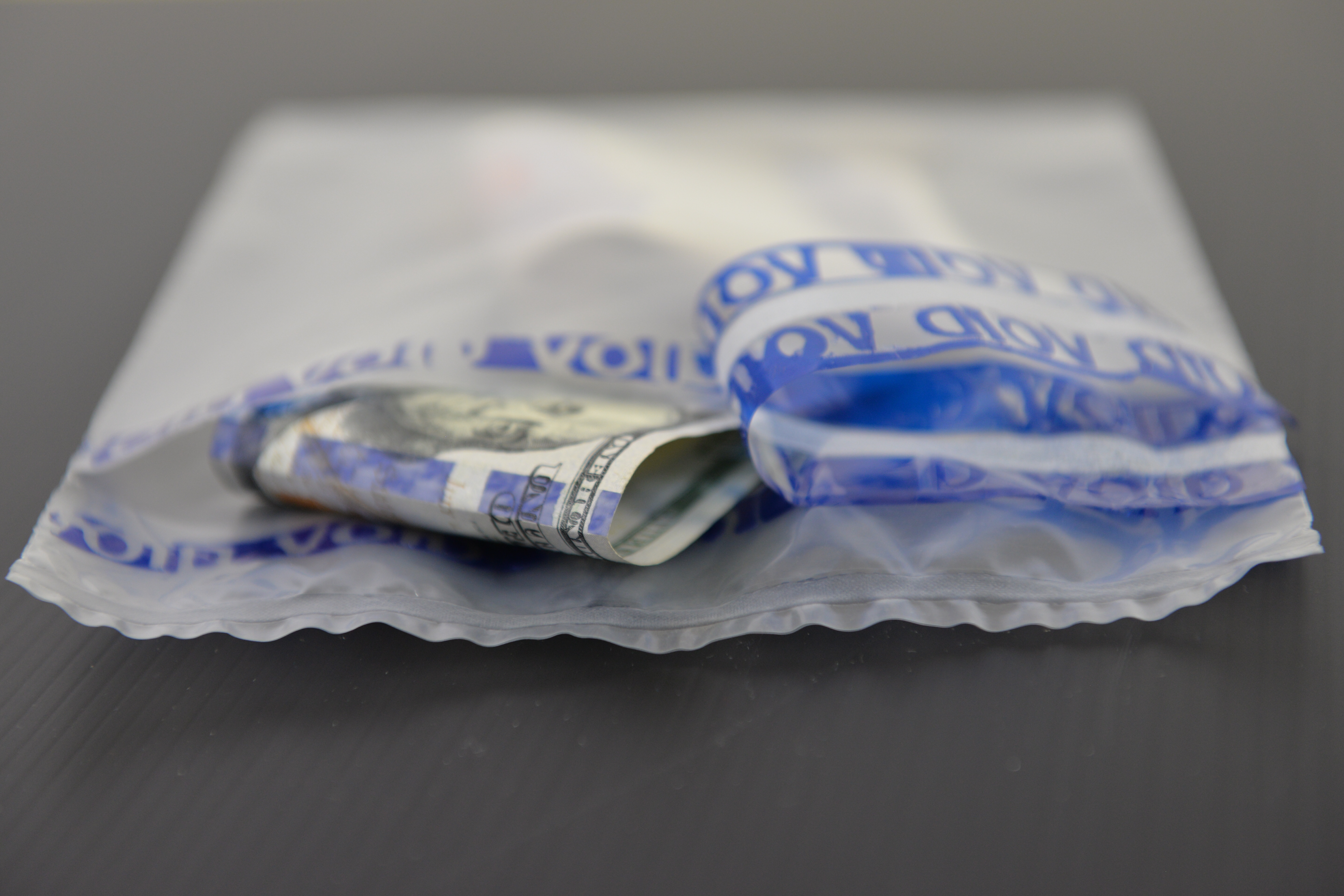
Tamper evident bag tape providing additional layer of security

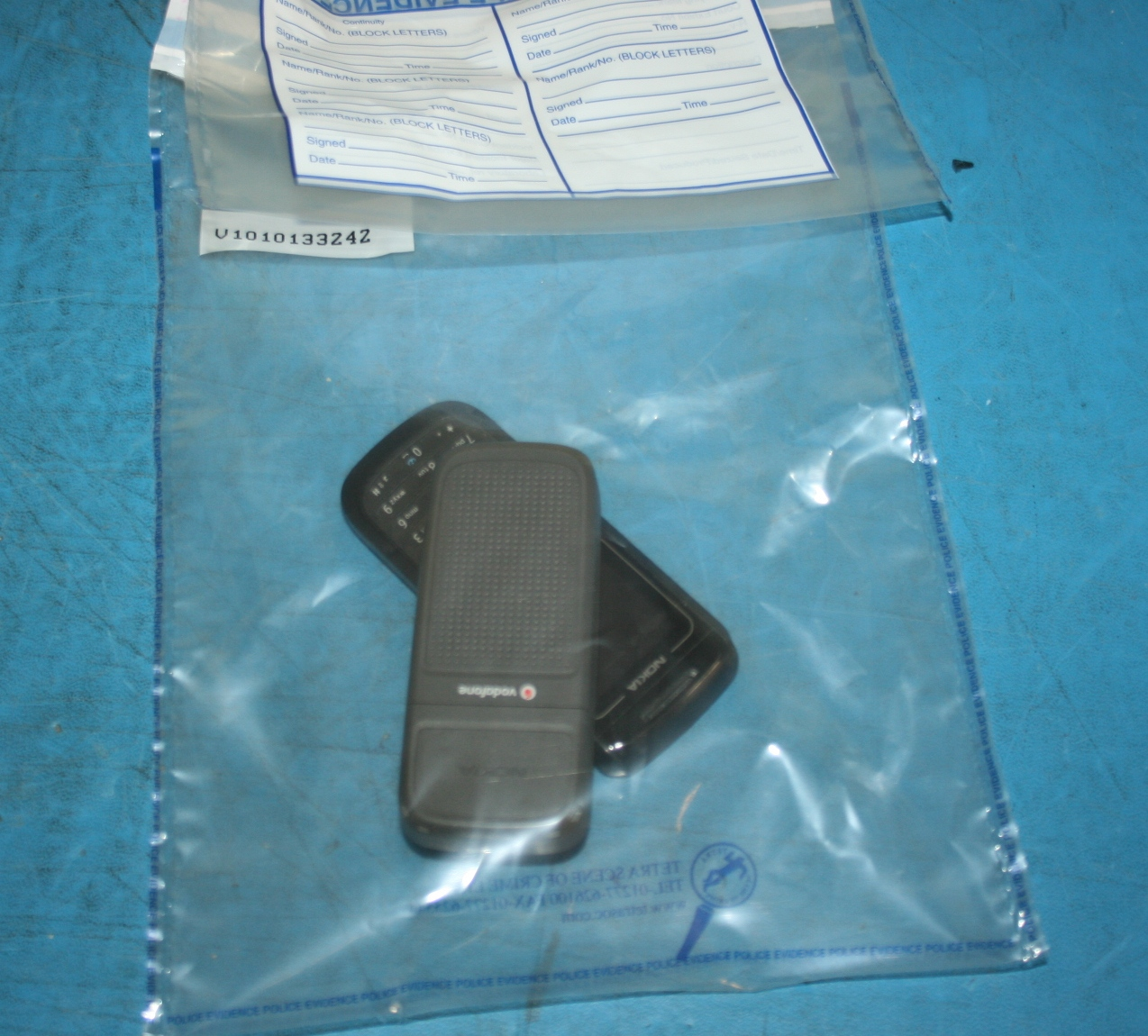
Evidence bag

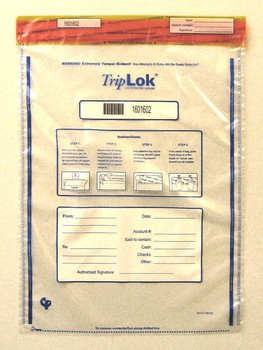
Currency bag

A security bag is a heavy duty bag used to contain high-value products, documents or legally sensitive items. Envelopes with security features are called security envelopes as well as security bags. Cash for deposit in a bank is often placed in a special deposit bag with security features. When they are used to contain items related to a crime, special evidence bags are used. Authentication of signatures and chain of custody are often required.

== Construction ==
Security bags or envelopes may be specially designed plastic bags, paper bags, or fabric bags. Bags or envelopes can be made to be tamper resistant to make it difficult for unauthorized entry. It is often more important for these to be tamper evident so that an unauthorized entry is easily detected to have occurred.

Bags and envelopes are often closed by an integral pressure sensitive adhesive on the closing flap. The removal of a release liner allows convenient closing of the bag. Several types of security features can be included in the flap structure and are designed to indicate its opening irreversibly.

Separate security tapes are also used. Tamper-indicating security seals employ a variety of mechanisms for operation, each with its own advantages and disadvantages.

Documentation such as labels for certified signatures for custody and chain-of-custody labels are frequently included.

== Use ==
No one security feature can be considered as "tamper proof". Layers of tamper-resistant and tamper-evident features, as well as the broader security systems are needed to provide better assurance of security. All security products can be foiled by a knowledgeable person with sufficient time and with access to specialized tools, solvents, extreme temperatures, other security bags, security tapes, etc.

== Faraday Bag ==
When electronic devices, cell phones, media storage, etc. are collected as evidence in a criminal investigation, faraday bags can be used to prevent damage or adulteration. As a Faraday cage, these have electromagnetic shielding to prevent electronic access to contents.

Smaller personal faraday bags are used to prevent unwanted access to credit cards, keyfobs, cell phones, etc.

== See also ==
- Currency packaging
- Dye pack
- Evidence management
- Provenance
- Package pilferage
- Security seal
- Traceability
