= Evidence management =

Administration and control of evidence to ensure traceability

Evidence management is the administration and control of evidence related to an event so that it can be used to prove the circumstances of the event, and so that this proof can be tested by independent parties with confidence that the evidence provided is the evidence collected related to the event.

== Aspects of evidence management ==
Evidence management requires that the evidence is:

- collected in a fashion which does not compromise the nature of the evidence
- kept in a fashion which maintains the nature of the evidence
- handled in a fashion which allows no doubt that the evidence could not have been accidentally or deliberately altered or substituted

that is, the evidence presented for the proof is the exact evidence collected.

Evidence management requires the techniques used in:

- warehousing and inventory control, of many items of evidence related to many events
- curation and keeping of delicate and sensitive items, of a broad range in type of material and size
- secure custodianship and handover of responsibility, from the time and place of collection to the time and place of presentation as elements of a proof, often called either chain of custody or evidence continuity

=== Evidence lifetime ===
Evidence must be managed and administered over its entire lifetime. The lifetime of a piece of evidence includes a number of key stages, from the piece of evidence's acquisition to its eventual disposal:

- Acquisition, which can be by:
  - Collection, for example at a crime scene
  - Seizure
  - Voluntary deposit
- Description, which includes:
  - Indexing
  - Describing
  - Digitising, for example, photographing or scanning
- Duty of care, for example, document seizure from a business which by definition requires the documents to carry out its business, can include:
  - Copying of evidence
  - Provision of copies to evidence owner
- Analysis, which includes:
  - Information interpretation, for example, the content of documents
  - Materials testing, for example of drug type, paper type, ink type
  - Environmental context investigation, for example of included matter, animal life, fingerprints
- Assessment
  - Relevance to elements of proofs
- Presentation, which includes
  - Disclosure, for example, pre trial to defense
  - In court, and an appeal
- Disposal, which can be by:
  - Return to owner
  - Destruction, of illicit or redundant or obsolete or sensitive or confidential material
  - Sale or donation, of no owner identifiable material

=== Accountability and responsibility ===
At all stages of its life, the piece of evidence must typically be moved in and out of storage, and be handled by different people. This places very strong requirements on the integrity of the chain of custody, and in particular on the personnel involved and the duty of care of the organisation responsible. For example, Interpol has published standards to combat corruption, and Standard 4.12 refers to systems and states: "Having and maintaining systems of revenue collection, money and property handling and for the control and preservation of evidence that ensures that those collecting or handling money, dealing with evidence or handling property are accountable and that the systems are such as to deter corruption."

Evidence and property management is typically considered critical to the extent that the efficiency or economy of the processes are secondary to the integrity of the evidence and property.

The digitising of evidence is reducing the need to handle the original evidence until it is presented. The reduction in the handling of the original evidence lessens the likelihood of deliberate tampering or accidental contamination and reduces chain of custody requirements and overheads.

While the chain of custody stops with the presentation, accountability and responsibility remain until the evidence is disposed of.

=== Evidence management and its impact on criminal prosecutions ===
Evidence management is critical to the outcome of criminal prosecutions. If any of the above aspects of evidence management fail in relation to the evidence required for a prosecution, then it can compromise the outcome of the prosecution.

=== Standards and procedures ===
The proper management of evidence is so important to organisations responsible for evidence that they develop formal standards for the management, administration, and handling of evidence. The failure to apply proper standards to property processing can result in severe criticism of an organisation. These standards and procedures can vary from consensual indicative standards internationally adopted as a benchmark reference by organisations across the world, be specific to the initial evidence handling procedures for specific institutions, be the lifetime standards for evidence handling for an organisation, or be formal national standards.

== Management of physical evidence ==
Managing physical evidence requires suitable storage facilities. Storage facilities for evidence can vary in size from a single secure cabinet in an office to large dedicated warehouses. The physical storage of evidence in modern departments is often accomplished using high-density shelving systems. These systems allow the use of only one aisle to access several rows of shelving by means of rolling carriages that have shelving mounted to them.

This results in storing double the amount of evidence in the same space that would be used on static shelving. These high-density storage systems can accommodate shelving, lockable drawers, bulk racks and lockable cabinets. In addition, high-density systems can lock off specific aisles for the various degrees of security often needed for items such as guns and drugs.

All but the smallest evidence storage facilities will contain multiple physical containers for separate pieces of evidence. The default container is a storage box although plastic bins and bags are also seen. Larger storage facilities will also provide environmentally controlled sections, for example, cold rooms or freezers, for the preservation of evidence. High-density systems are even more valuable when special environments such as cold rooms are required because they require less space.

== Physical container ==
The physical containers used to store items of evidence are sometimes called evidence storage units. The packaging used to store evidence performs a number of functions. These include:

- physical stability of the evidence;
- regular and organised stacking and placement to allow optimal access;
- protection of evidence management personnel from dangers inherent in the evidence.

Physical containers for pieces of evidence vary in the type of storage they provide.

Highly desirable pieces of evidence such as precious metals, currency, jewelry, firearms, and drugs often require higher levels of storage to protect them from theft, and reentry into the criminal environment.

Inherently dangerous items of evidence such as drugs, and chemical, biological, nuclear, radiological materials require higher levels of storage to protect the well-being of evidence management personnel.

Physical containers are typically sized and shaped so that one person can handle them. Small items can be placed in an evidence bag: a plastic bag with special tamper resistant features and places to record the chain of custody. Large volumes of evidence will require larger containers typically able to be handled using a fork lift. Special Faraday bags are used to prevent unauthorized wireless access to sensitive electronic evidence.

== Evidence management organisational units ==
=== Evidence storage work unit ===
Most organisations collecting evidence have specific work units responsible for the safekeeping and preservation of evidence.

==== Other duties of a property office ====
When the organisation is a police agency, the property office is typically also responsible for found property.
