= Security tape =

Adhesive tape to indicate possible theft

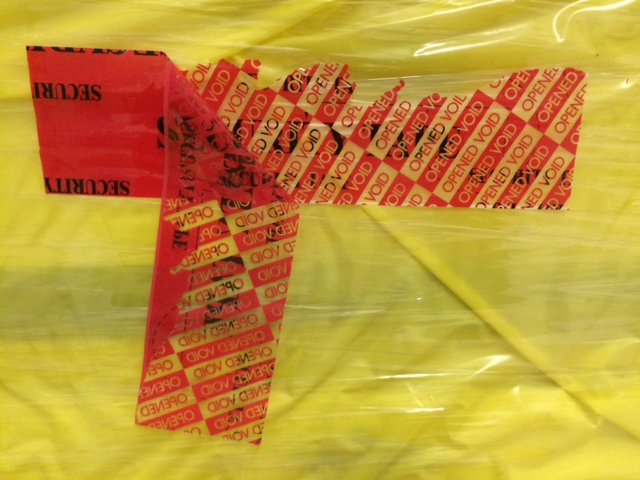
Delamination and printing exposure of a security tape on a pallet load

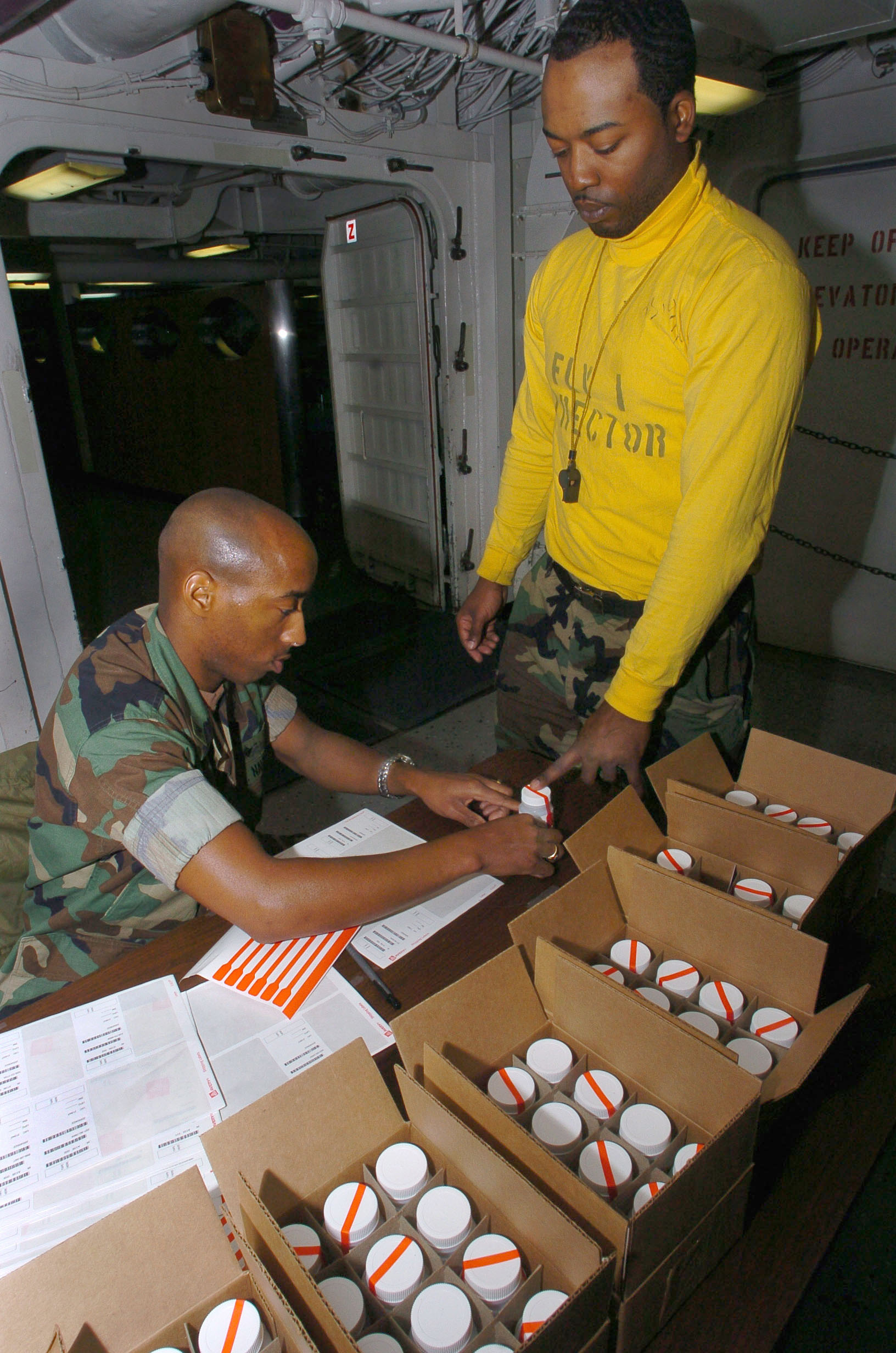
Specimen test bottles with die-cut security strip indicators

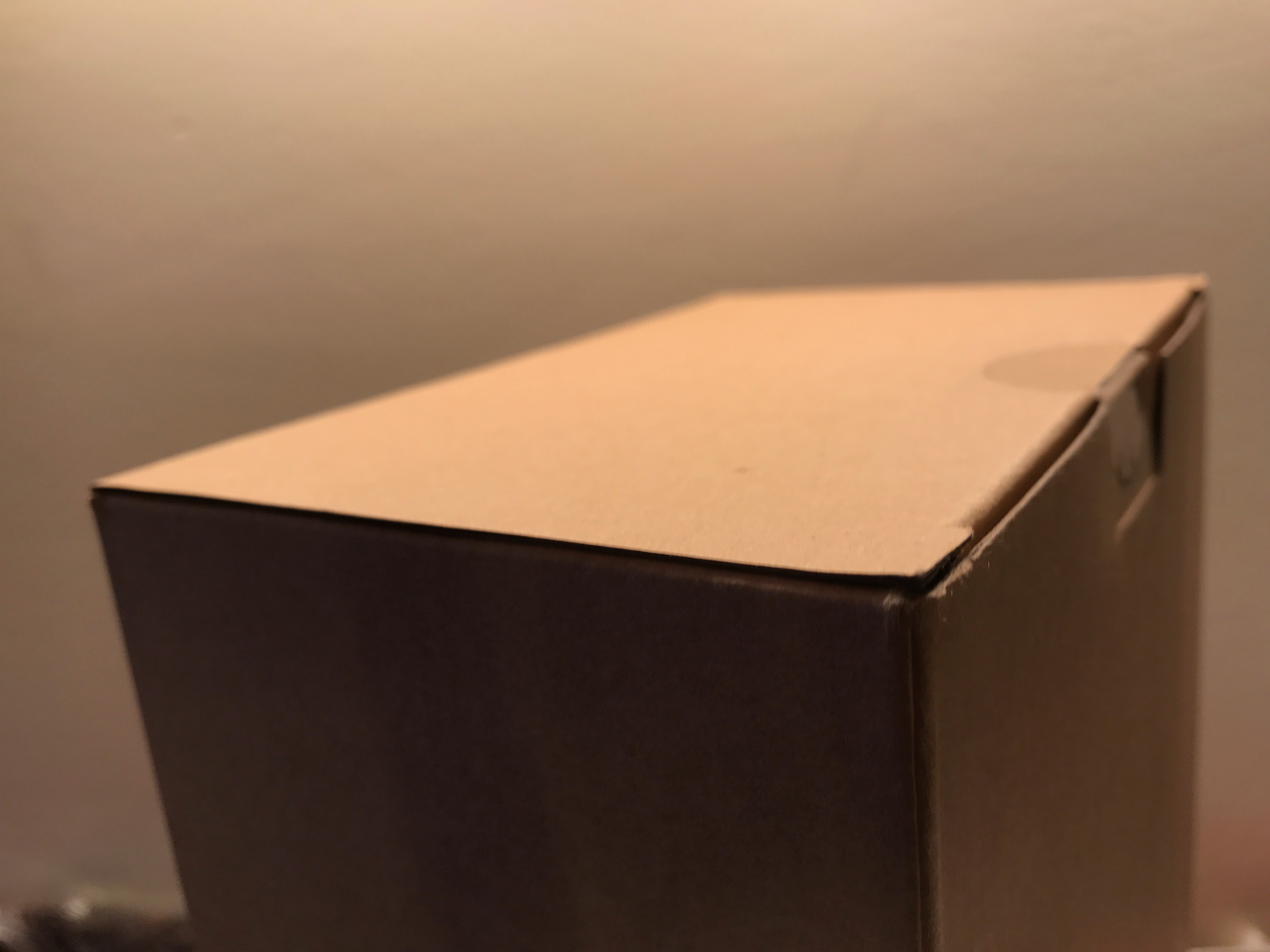
Box with circular tamper-evident seal

Security tape (or security label) is a type of adhesive tape used to help reduce shipping losses due to pilfering and theft. It helps reduce tampering or product adulteration. It is often a pressure-sensitive tape or label with special tamper-resistant or tamper-evident features. It can be used as a security seal in addition to a container closure or can be used as a security label. They are sometimes used as or with authentication products and as an anti-pilferage seal.

Security tapes and labels are sometimes used in conjunction with security envelopes.

== Use ==
Security tapes can be used as packaging tapes on small primary packages such as bottles and cartons or on larger shipping containers such as corrugated boxes. They are also used on unit loads or palletized goods. The strength and adhesive bonding are important. Security labels are usually only used for their security features; backing strength is less important but the bonding characteristics are critical.

Some security tapes have an appearance similar to standard packaging tapes to help conceal the value of an item. Logistics and packaging professionals do not want to bring attention to the item or its package. Other security tapes have bright colors with high impact graphics.

Security tapes and labels are one part of a broader security system: No one layer of security can provide full protection to shipments of packages. Most security products can be foiled by a knowledgeable person with sufficient time and with access to specialized tools, solvents, extreme temperatures, other security tapes and labels, adhesives, etc.

Security tapes and labels usually add security to one point of entry to a container. Other points of unauthorized entry are sometimes available.

Security tapes are also used on access doors for temporary area denial and as tamper-indicating seals for sensitive equipment. Some uses of security tapes require stable temperatures and the non-exposure of the tape to direct sunlight.

== Construction ==
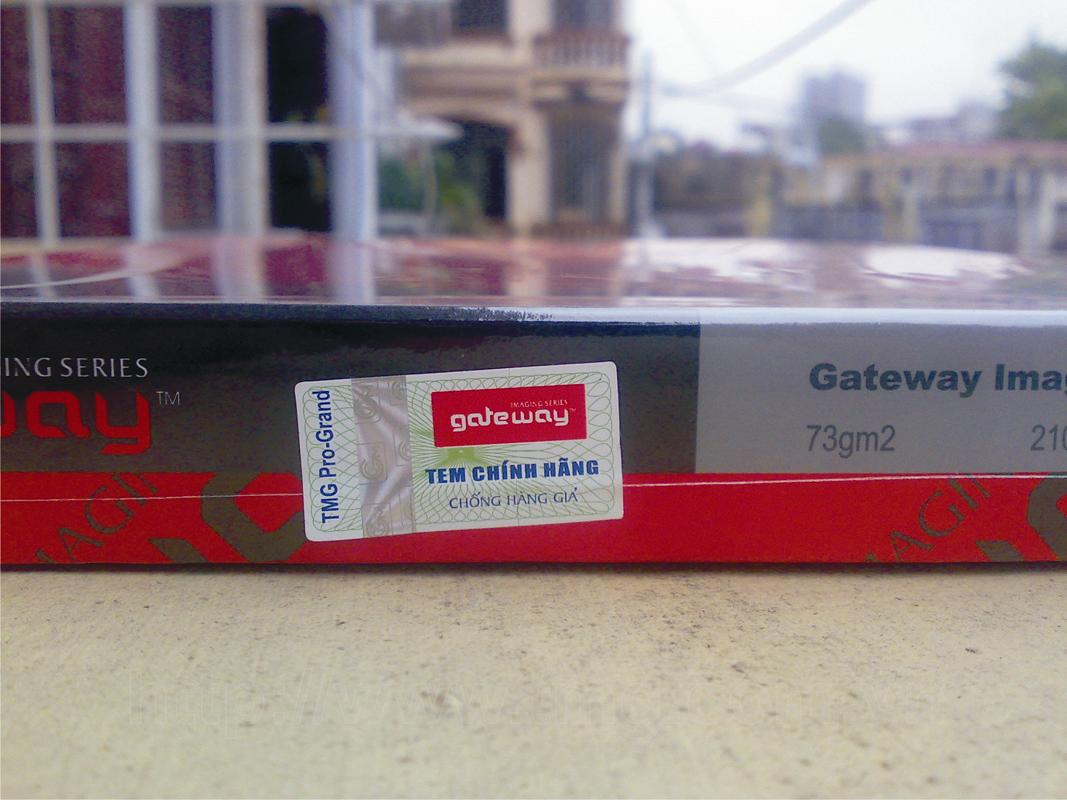
A security hologram label on a box

There are many types and constructions of tapes used for security. and labels What features to use depends on the intended kind of security, be it resistance to forgery, resistance to rough handling, or tamper-evidence.

Resistance to forgery is commonly provided by security printing, holography, and embossing. Some tape strips and labels have serial numbers to guarantee uniqueness, or barcodes or RFID chips that provide the same function. A connected website may provide information on whether a package of a given serial number exists and whether it has been checked before (to prevent cloning).

Many security tapes have extra strong backings and high performance adhesives under the backing. This keeps the package closed during rough handling, especially as a damaged or partially open package can be an invitation to theft or tampering. High graphics can draw attention to a package during shipment.

Security tapes often have special features to indicate opening, including:

- Intentionally weak or frangible components
- Printing which cannot easily be realigned after a cut or tear
- Hidden print layers which indicate opening
- Serrations or perforations to make one-piece removal more difficult
- RFID indicating systems: one form uses a chip that checks whether a conductive "track" connection is intact, another simply have the antenna or chip break on opening.

Security tapes are usually wound on a roll for storage and dispensing. Either a release liner is used or a premium release coating is used on the top surface. Security labels typically employ a release liner and are die-cut.

== Interpretation ==
Sometimes a tape or label is intended to provide a signal of removal or of container tampering: imaging, delamination, fracture, etc. The desired outcome is for the tape or label to correctly indicate attempted or unauthorized container opening. Conversely, it should not signal tampering when there has not been tampering. This is a type of binary classification.

It may be possible to have a "false negative": the label is (or appears to be) intact yet tampering has occurred. Depending on the specific security tape/label, there may be specialized means of removing and reattaching the label, covering or obscuring the signaled/activated label, etc. Also, tampering could have occurred in a different part of the container. A "false positive" may also be possible, either by accident or with intent.

	Tampering	No Tampering
Tape/label signal	Correct signal	False positive
No signal from tape/label	False negative	Correct signal

== See also ==
- Electronic article surveillance
- Barricade tape
- Evaluation of binary classifiers
- Counterfeit consumer good
