= Cardboard box =

Type of packaging

Cardboard Box
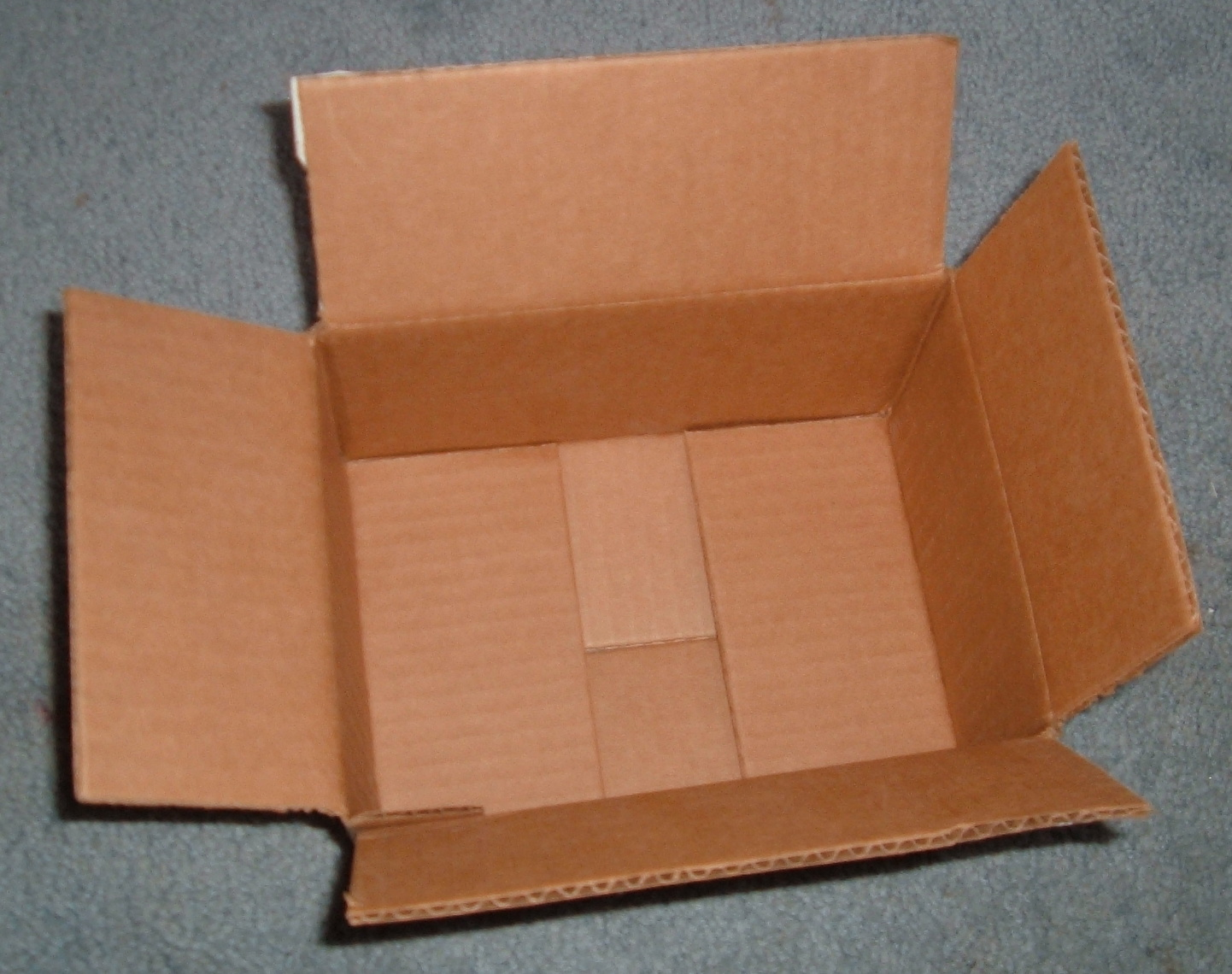
- Corrugated shipping container, one type of cardboard box
- Type: Container
- Inventor: Robert Gair
- Inception: 1890; 136 years ago
- Manufacturer: Various
- Available: Globally

Cardboard boxes are industrially prefabricated boxes, primarily used for packaging goods and materials. Specialists in industry seldom use the term cardboard because it does not denote a specific material. The term cardboard may refer to a variety of heavy paper-like materials, including card stock, corrugated fiberboard, and paperboard. Cardboard boxes can be readily recycled.

== Terminology ==
Several types of containers are sometimes called cardboard boxes:

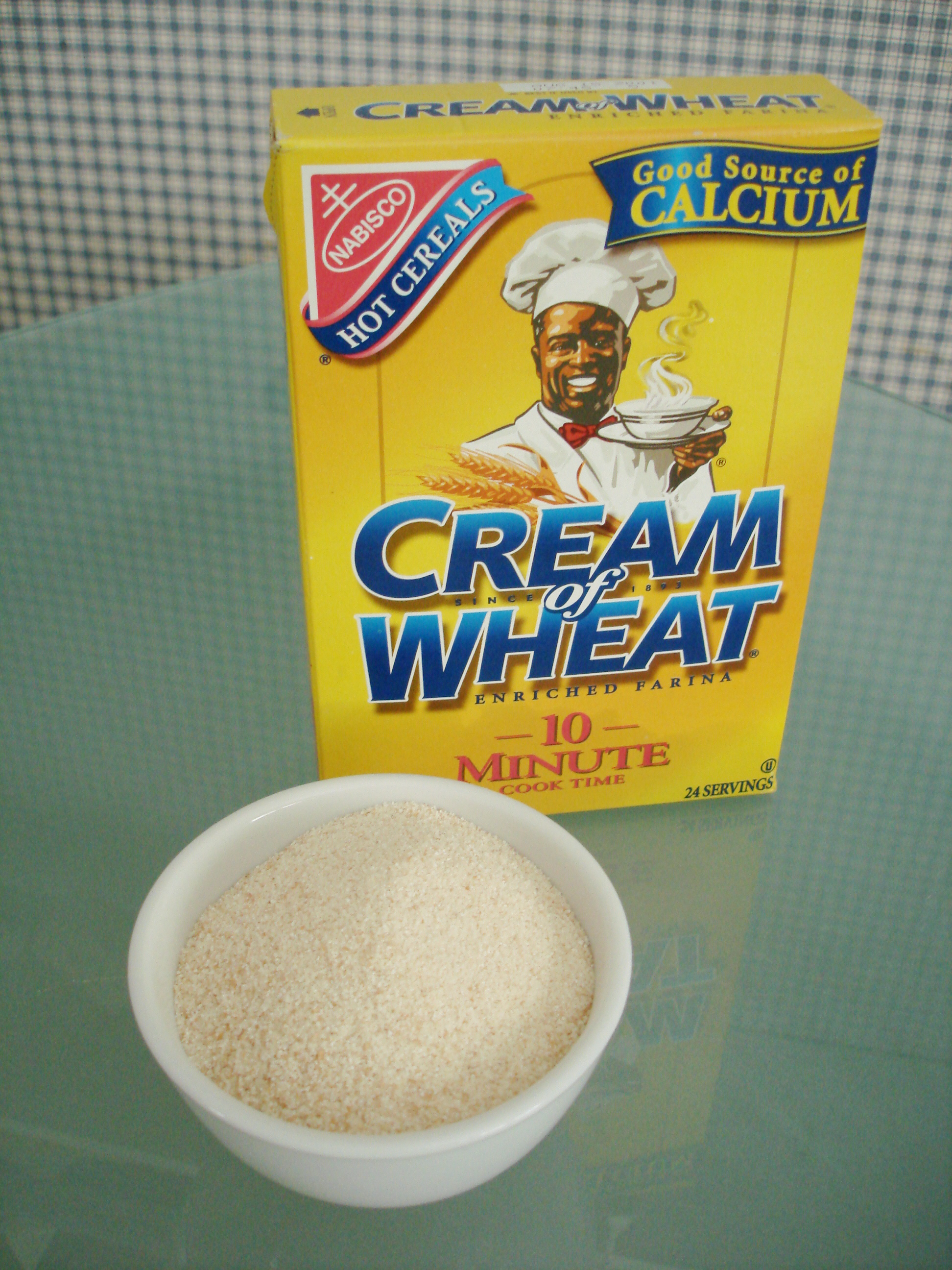
Paperboard carton or box

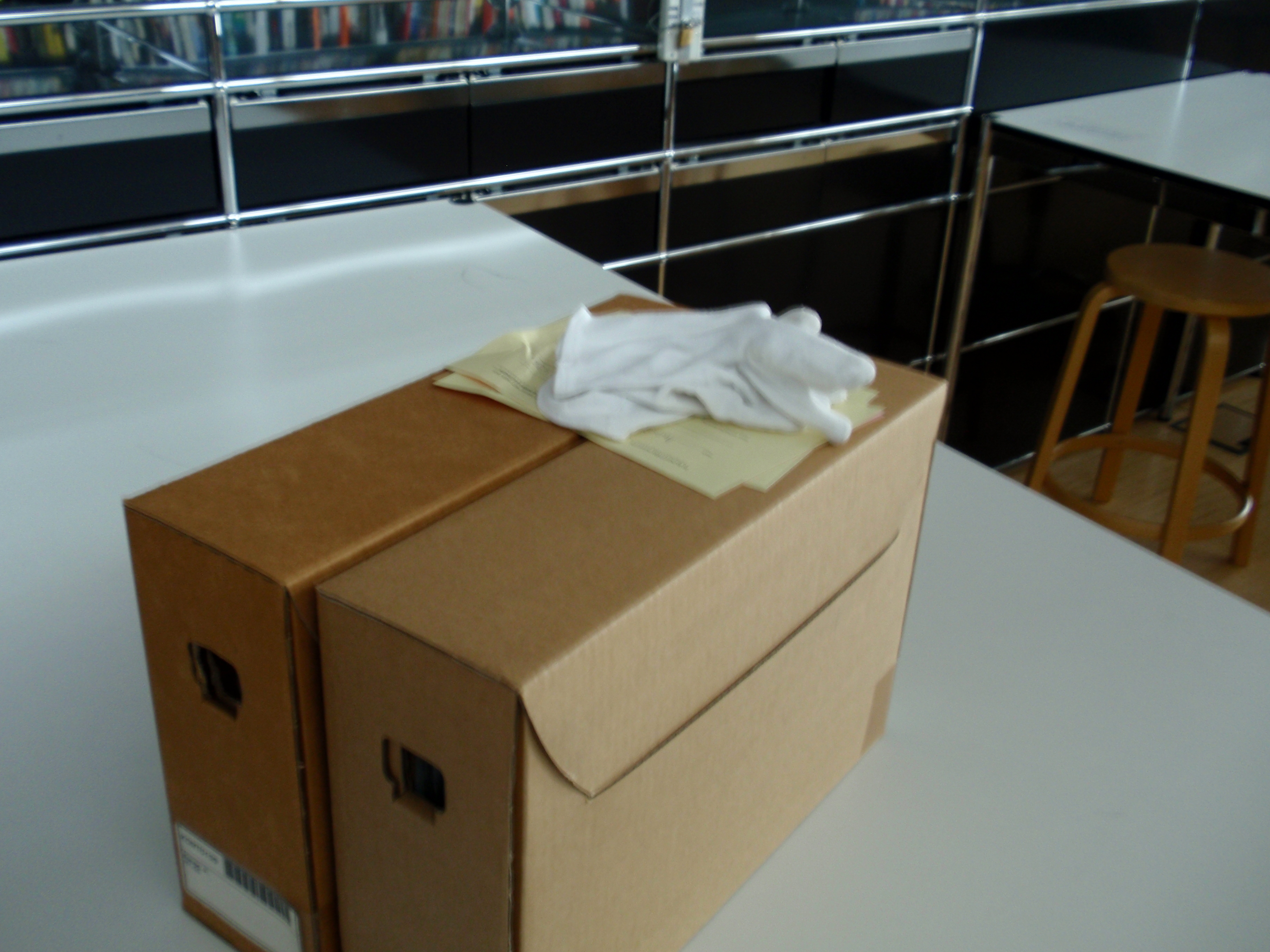
Corrugated box

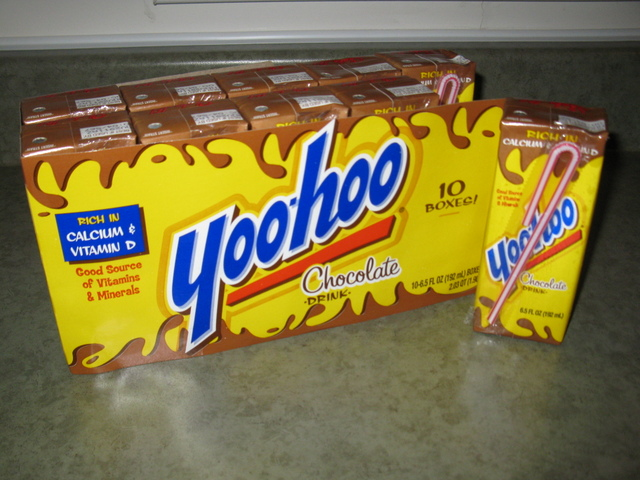
Drink box

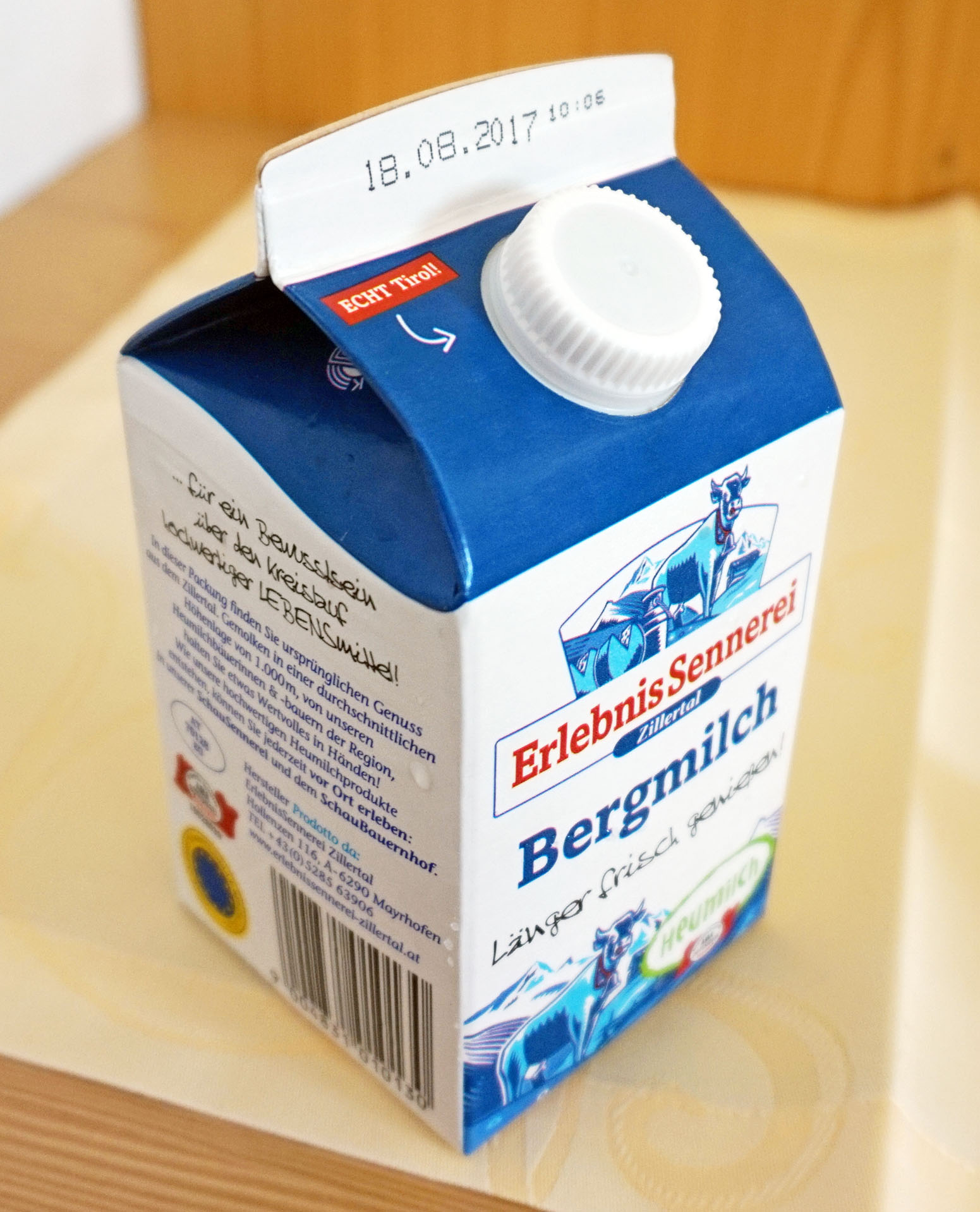
Gable-top carton made of liquid packaging board

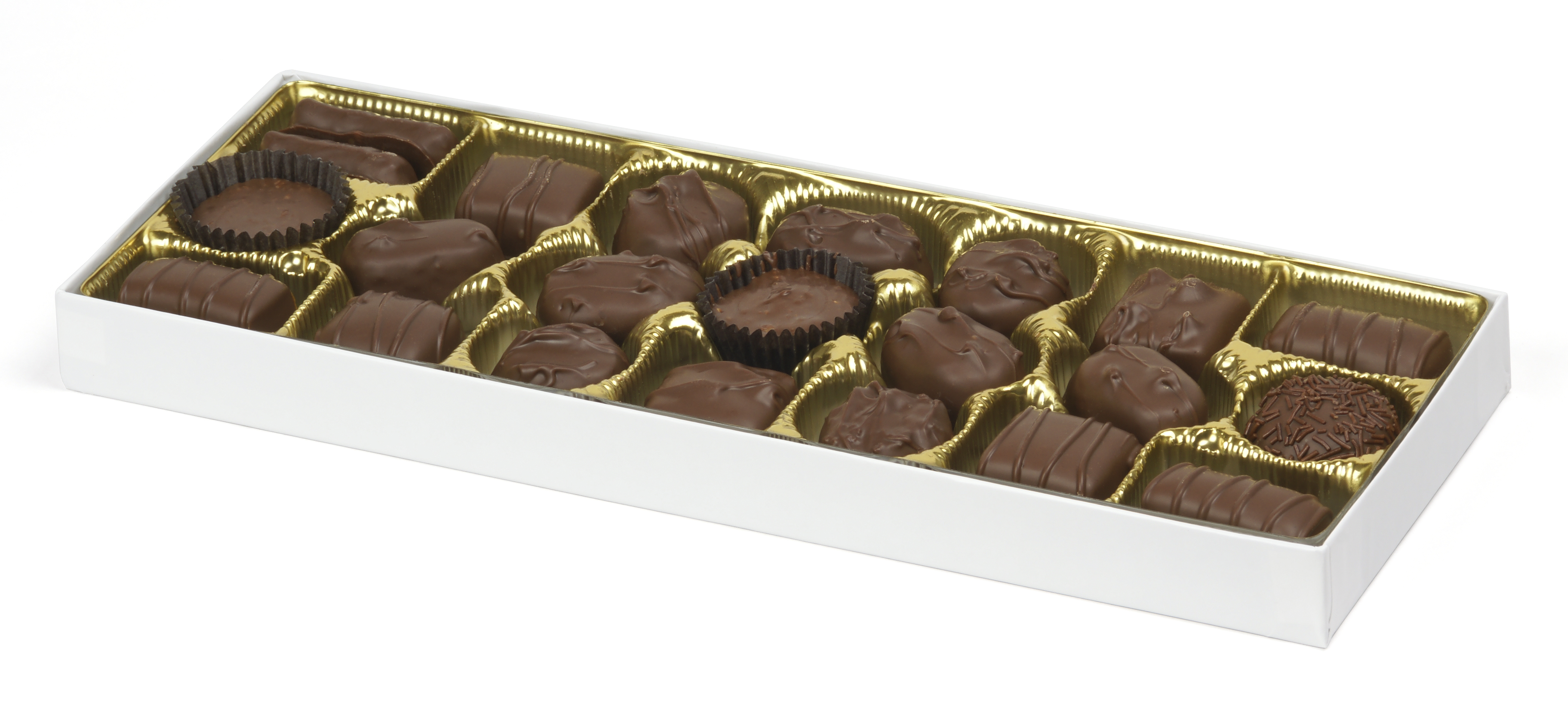
Set-up box made of rigid paperboard

In business and industry, material producers, container manufacturers, packaging engineers, and standards organizations, try to use more specific terminology. There is still not complete and uniform usage. Often the term "cardboard" is avoided because it does not define any particular material.

Broad divisions of paper-based packaging materials are:

- Paper is a thin material mainly used for writing upon, printing upon, or for packaging. It is produced by pressing together moist fibers, typically cellulose pulp derived from wood, rags, or grasses, and drying them into flexible sheets.
- Paperboard, sometimes known as cardboard, is generally thicker (usually over 0.25 mm or 10 points) than paper. According to ISO standards, paperboard is a paper with a basis weight (grammage) above 224 g/m^{2}, but there are exceptions. Paperboard can be single- or multi-ply.
- Corrugated fiberboard sometimes known as corrugated board or corrugated cardboard, is a combined paper-based material consisting of a fluted corrugated medium and one or two flat liner boards. The flute gives corrugated boxes much of their strength and is a contributing factor for why corrugated fiberboard is commonly used for shipping and storage.

There are also multiple names for containers:

- A shipping container made of corrugated fiberboard is sometimes called a "cardboard box", a "carton", or a "case". There are many options for corrugated box design. Shipping container is used in shipping and transporting goods due to its strength and durability, thus corrugated boxes are designed to withstand the rigors of transportation and handling.
- A folding carton made of paperboard is sometimes called a "cardboard box". Commonly used for packaging consumer goods, such as cereals, cosmetics, and pharmaceuticals. These cartons are designed to fold flat when empty, saving space during storage and transport.
- A set-up box is made of a non-bending grade of paperboard and is sometimes called a "cardboard box". Often used for high-end products, such as jewelry, electronics, or gift items. Unlike folding cartons, set-up boxes do not fold flat and are delivered fully constructed.
- Drink boxes made of paperboard laminates, are sometimes called "cardboard boxes", "cartons", or "boxes". Widely used for packaging beverages like juice, milk, and wine. These cartons are designed to maintain the freshness of liquid products and are often used in aseptic packaging.

== History ==
The first commercial paperboard (not corrugated) box is sometimes credited to the firm M. Treverton & Son in England in 1817. Cardboard box packaging was made the same year in Germany.

The Scottish-born Robert Gair invented the pre-cut cardboard or paperboard box in 1890 – flat pieces manufactured in bulk that folded into boxes. Gair's invention came about as a result of an accident: he was a Brooklyn printer and paper-bag maker during the 1870s, and one day, while he was printing an order of seed bags, a metal ruler normally used to crease bags shifted in position and cut them. Gair discovered that by cutting and creasing in one operation he could make prefabricated paperboard boxes. Applying this idea to corrugated boxboard was a straightforward development when the material became available around the turn of the twentieth century.

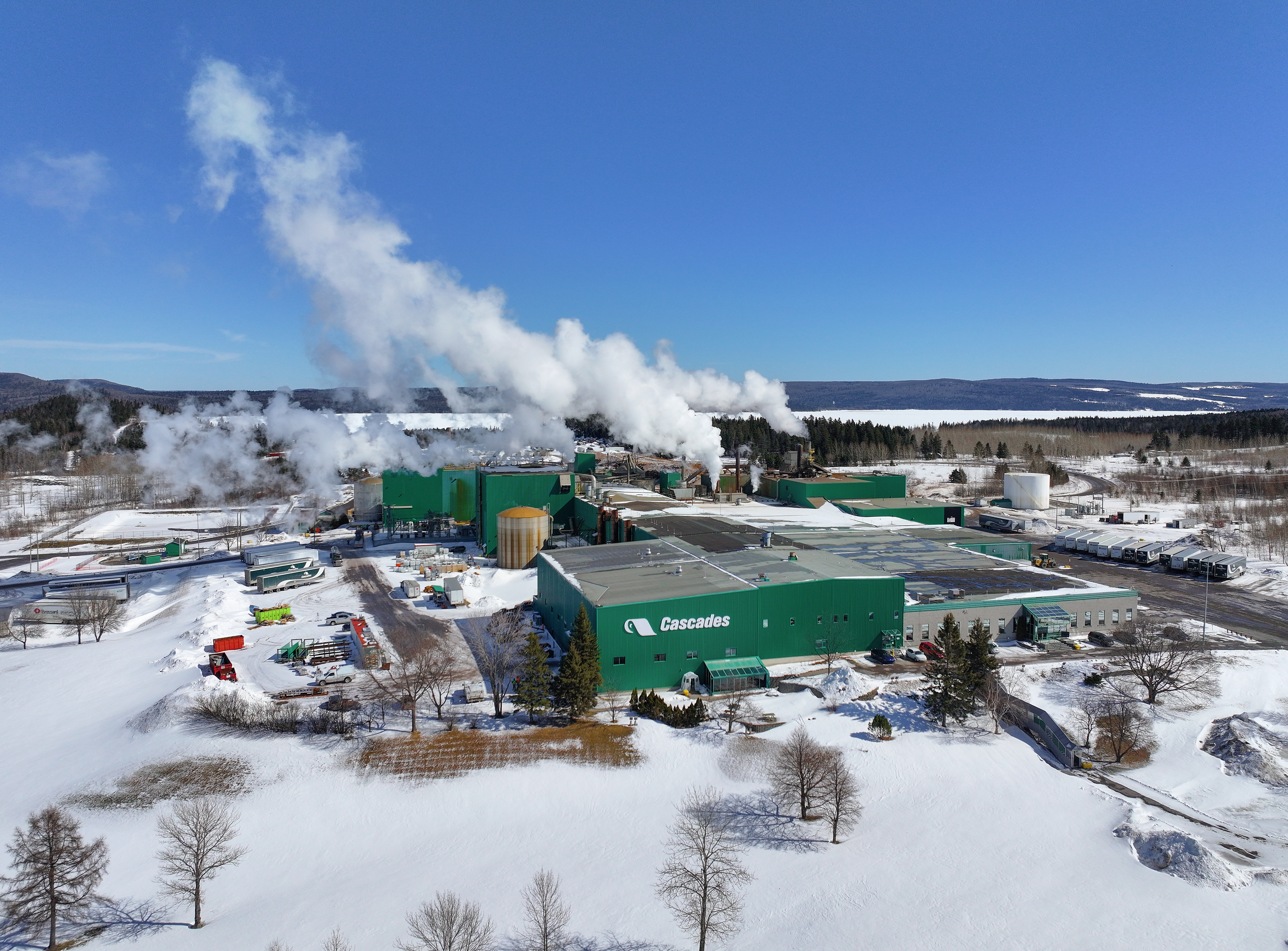
A cardboard packaging plant in Témiscouata-sur-le-Lac, Quebec

Cardboard boxes were developed in France about 1840 for transporting the Bombyx mori moth and its eggs by silk manufacturers, and for more than a century the manufacture of cardboard boxes was a major industry in the Valréas area.

The advent of lightweight flaked cereals increased the use of cardboard boxes. The first to use cardboard boxes as cereal cartons was the Kellogg Company.

Corrugated (also called pleated) paper was patented in England in 1856, and used as a liner for tall hats, but corrugated boxboard was not patented and used as a shipping material until 20 December 1871. The patent was issued to Albert L. Jones of New York City for single-sided (single-face) corrugated board. Jones used the corrugated board for wrapping bottles and glass lantern chimneys. The first machine for producing large quantities of corrugated board was built in 1874 by G. Smyth, and in the same year Oliver Long improved upon Jones's design by inventing corrugated board with liner sheets on both sides. This was corrugated cardboard as we know it today.

The first corrugated cardboard box manufactured in the US was in 1895. By the early 1900s, wooden crates and boxes were being replaced by corrugated paper shipping cartons.

By 1908, the terms "corrugated paper-board" and "corrugated cardboard" were both in use in the paper trade.

== Crafts and entertainment ==
Cardboard and other paper-based materials (paperboard, corrugated fiberboard, etc.) can have a post-primary life as a cheap material for the construction of a range of projects, among them being science experiments, children's toys, costumes, or insulative lining. Some children enjoy playing inside boxes.

A common cliché is that, if presented with a large and expensive new toy, a child will quickly become bored with the toy and play with the box instead. Although this is usually said somewhat jokingly, children certainly enjoy playing with boxes, using their imagination to portray the box as an infinite variety of objects. One example of this in popular culture is from the comic strip Calvin and Hobbes, whose protagonist, Calvin, often imagined a cardboard box as a "transmogrifier", a "duplicator", or a time machine.

So prevalent is the cardboard box's reputation as a plaything that in 2005 a cardboard box was added to the National Toy Hall of Fame in the US, one of very few non-brand-specific toys to be honoured with inclusion. As a result, a toy "house" (actually a log cabin) made from a large cardboard box was added to the Hall, housed at the Strong National Museum of Play in Rochester, New York.

The Metal Gear series of stealth video games has a running gag involving a cardboard box as an in-game item, which can be used by the player to evade detection.

== Housing and furniture ==
Living in a cardboard box is stereotypically associated with homelessness. However, in 2005, Melbourne architect Peter Ryan designed a house composed largely of cardboard. More common are small seatings or little tables made from corrugated cardboard. Merchandise displays made of cardboard are often found in self-service shops.

== Cushioning by crushing ==
Mass and viscosity of the enclosed air help together with the limited stiffness of boxes to absorb the energy of oncoming objects. In 2012, British stuntman Gary Connery safely landed via wingsuit without deploying his parachute, landing on a 3.6-metre (12 ft) high crushable "runway" (landing zone) built with thousands of cardboard boxes.

== See also ==
- Banana box, a type of cardboard box designed for transportation of bananas
- Eurocontainer, a system for boxes that can be used for reusable packaging for transport and storage
- The Adventure of the Cardboard Box (a Sherlock Holmes story)
