= Box =

Type of container

A wooden box with a hinged lid

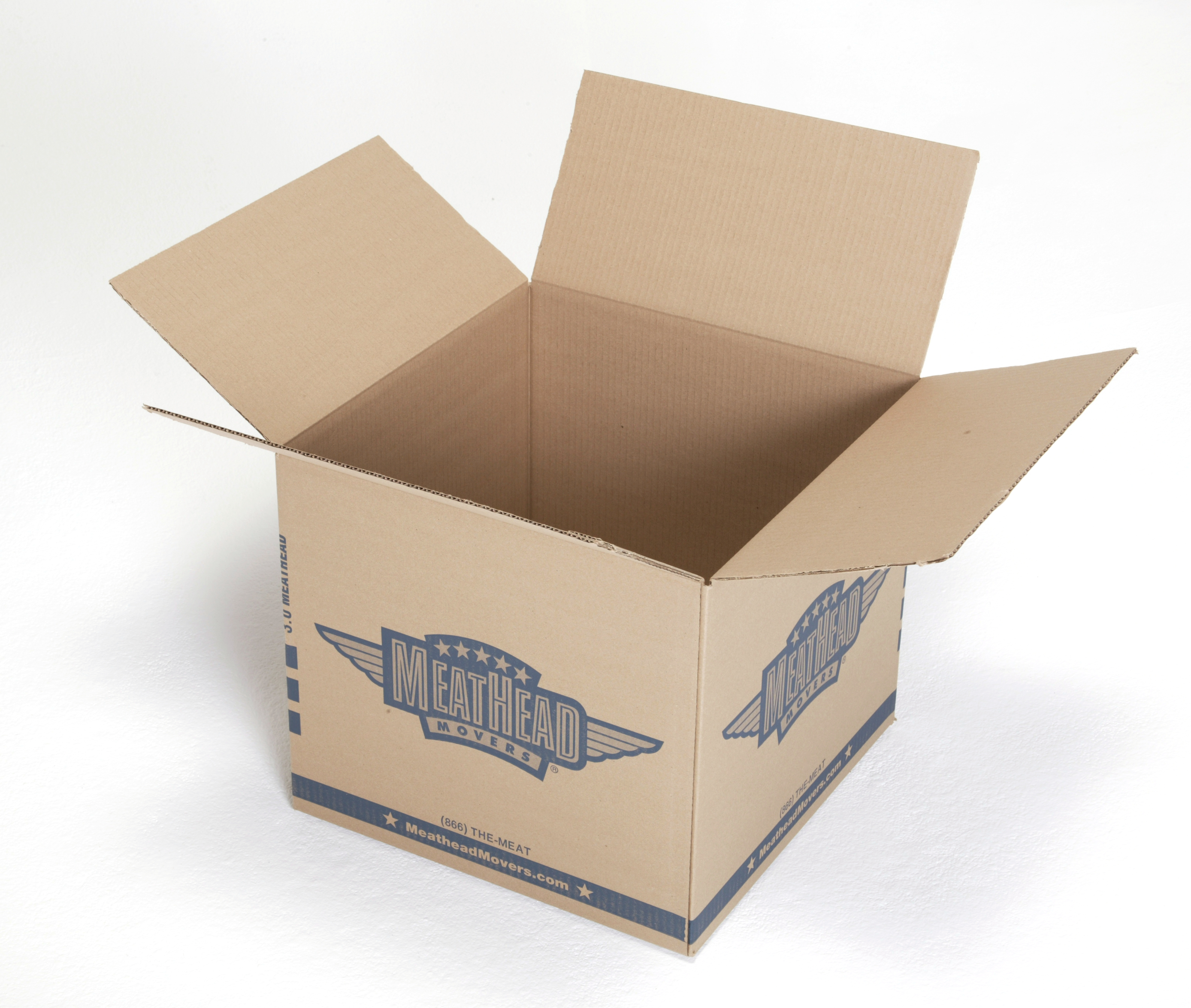
An empty corrugated fiberboard box

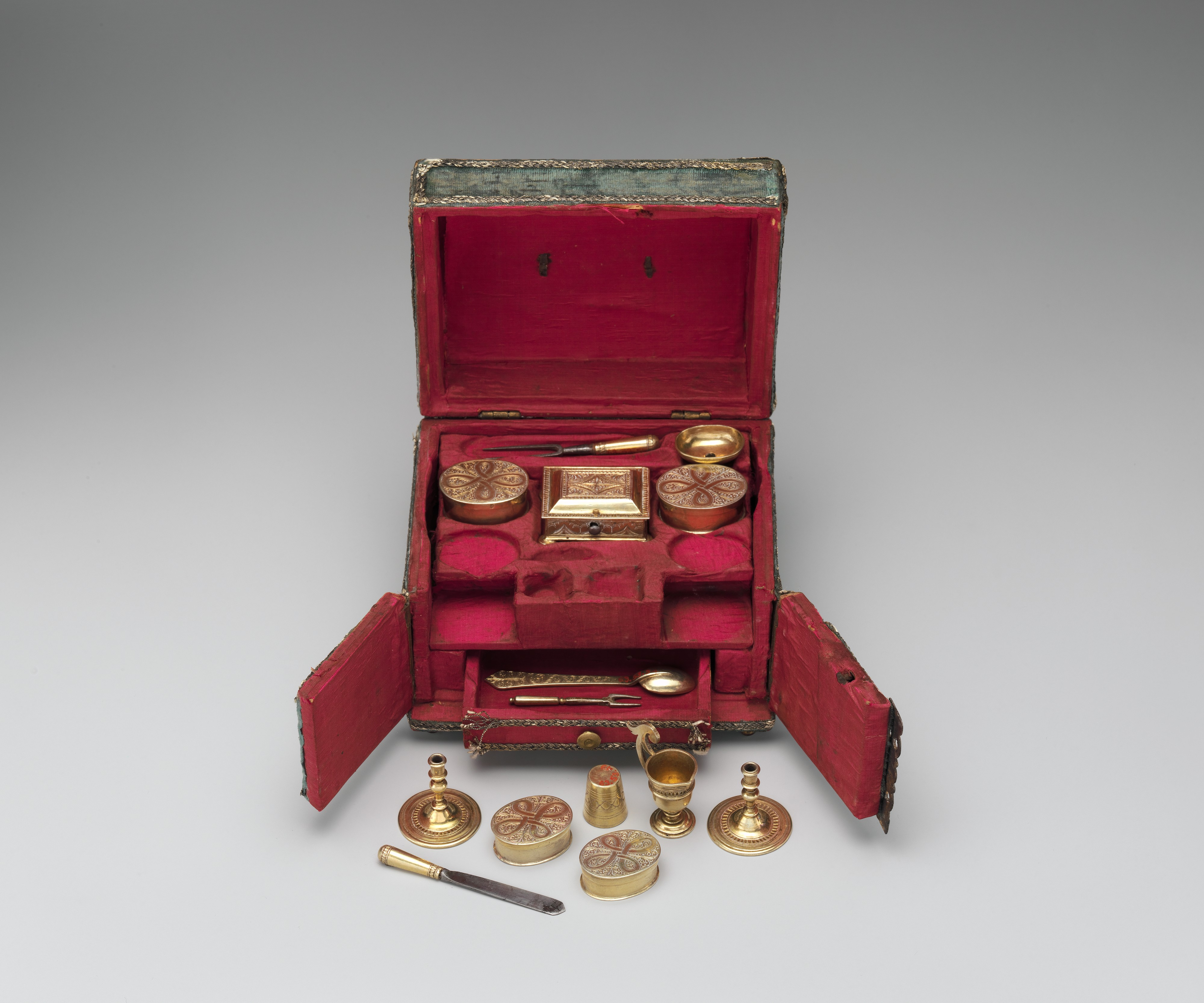
An elaborate late 17th to early 18th century box (Metropolitan Museum of Art, New York City)

A box (plural: boxes) is a container with rigid sides used for the storage or transportation of its contents. Most boxes have flat, parallel, rectangular sides (typically rectangular prisms). Boxes can be very small (like a matchbox) or very large (like a shipping box for furniture) and can be used for a variety of purposes, from functional to decorative.

Boxes may be made of a variety of materials, both durable (such as wood and metal) and non-durable (such as corrugated fiberboard and paperboard). Corrugated metal boxes are commonly used as shipping containers.

Boxes may be closed and shut with flaps, doors, or a separate lid. They can be secured shut with adhesives, tapes, string, or more decorative or elaborately functional mechanisms, such as catches, clasps or locks.

== Packaging ==
Several types of boxes are used in packaging and storage.

- A corrugated box is a shipping container made from corrugated fiberboard, most commonly used to transport products from a warehouse during distribution. Corrugated boxes are also known as cartons, cases, and cardboard boxes in various regions. Corrugated boxes are rated based on the strength of their material or their carrying capacity. Corrugated boxes are also used as product packaging, or in point of sale displays.
- Folding cartons (sometimes known as a box) are paperboard boxes manufactured with a folding lid. These are used to package a wide range of goods, and can be used for either one-time (non-resealable) usage, or as a storage box for more permanent use. Folding cartons are first printed (if necessary) before being die-cut and scored to form a blank; these are then transported and stored flat, before being constructed at the point of use.
  - A gift box is a variant on the folding carton, used for birthday or Christmas gifts.
- Gable boxes are paperboard cartons used for liquids.
- Setup boxes (also known as rigid paperboard boxes) are made of stiff paperboard and are permanently glued together with paper skins that can be printed or colored. Unlike folding cartons, these are assembled at the point of manufacture and transported as already constructed ("set-up"). Set up boxes are more expensive than folding boxes and are typically used for protecting high-value items such as cosmetics, watches or smaller consumer electronics.
- Crates are heavy duty shipping containers. Originally made of wood, crates are distinct from wooden boxes, also used as heavy-duty shipping containers, as a wooden container must have all six of its sides put in place to result in the rated strength of the container. The strength of a wooden box, on the other hand, is rated based on the weight it can carry before the top or opening is installed.
  - A wooden wine box or wine crate, originally used for shipping and storing expensive wines, is a variant of the wooden box now used for decorative or promotional purposes, or as a storage box during shipping.
- Bulk boxes are large boxes often used in industrial environments, sized to fit on a pallet.
- An ammunition box is a metal can or box for ammunition.

Depending on locale and usage, the terms carton and box are sometimes used interchangeably. The invention of large steel intermodal shipping containers has helped advance the globalization of commerce.

== Storage ==
Boxes for storing various items in can often be very decorative, as they are intended for permanent use and sometimes are put on display in certain locations.

The following are some types of storage boxes :

- A jewelry (American English) or jewellery (British English) box, is a box for trinkets or jewels. It can take a very modest form with paper covering and lining, covered in leather and lined with satin, or be larger and more highly decorated.
- A hat box is used for storing or transporting a hat. Hat boxes are often cylindrical or oval.
- A humidor is a special box for storing cigars at the proper humidity.
- A "strong box" or safe, is a secure lockable box for storing money or other valuable items. The term "strong box" is sometimes used for safes that are not portable but installed in a wall or floor.
- A toolbox is used for carrying tools of various kinds. They are usually used for portability rather than just storage.
- A toy box is name of box for storing toys.
- A box file is used in offices for storing papers and smaller files.

== Gallery ==
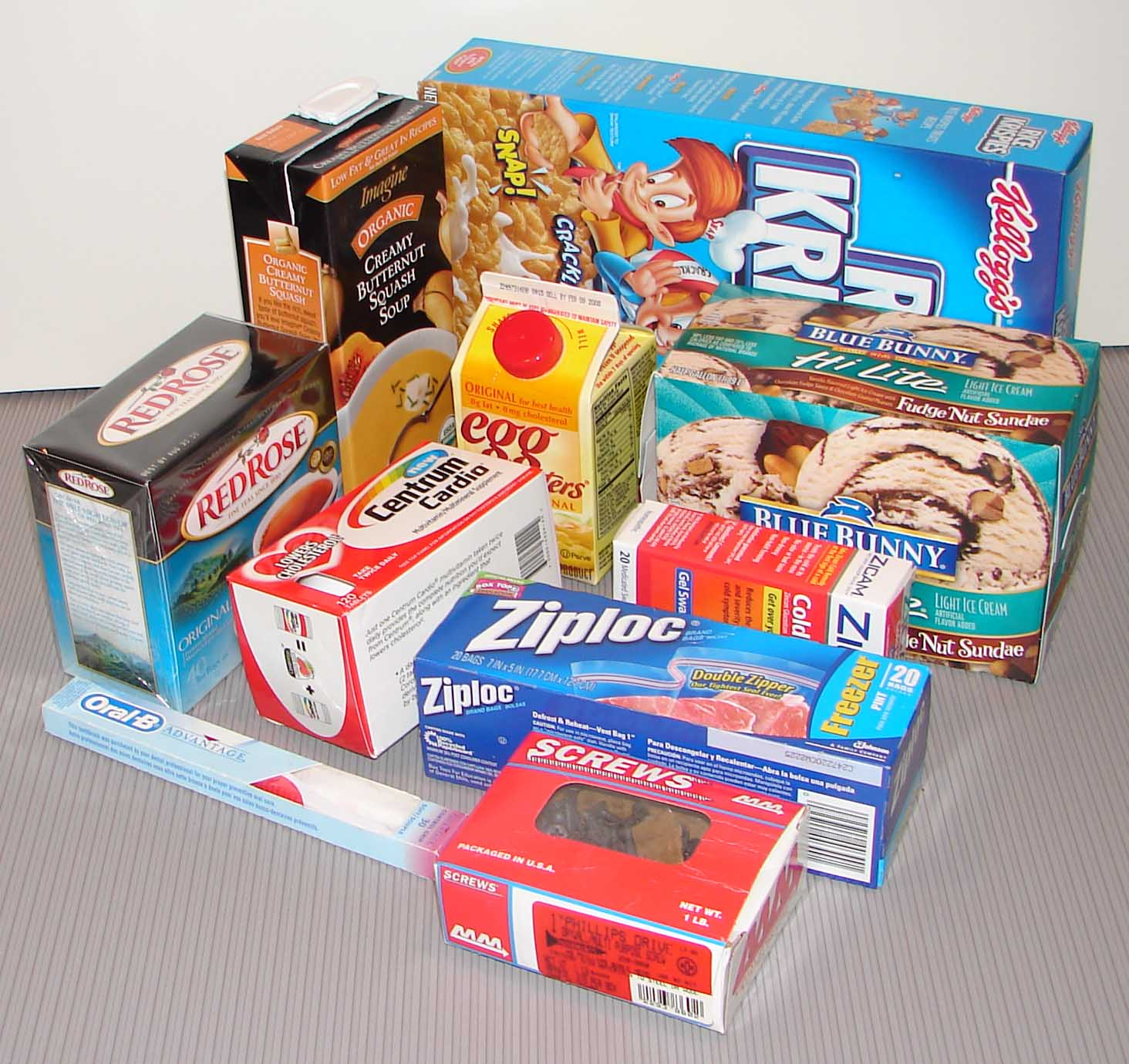
Cartons

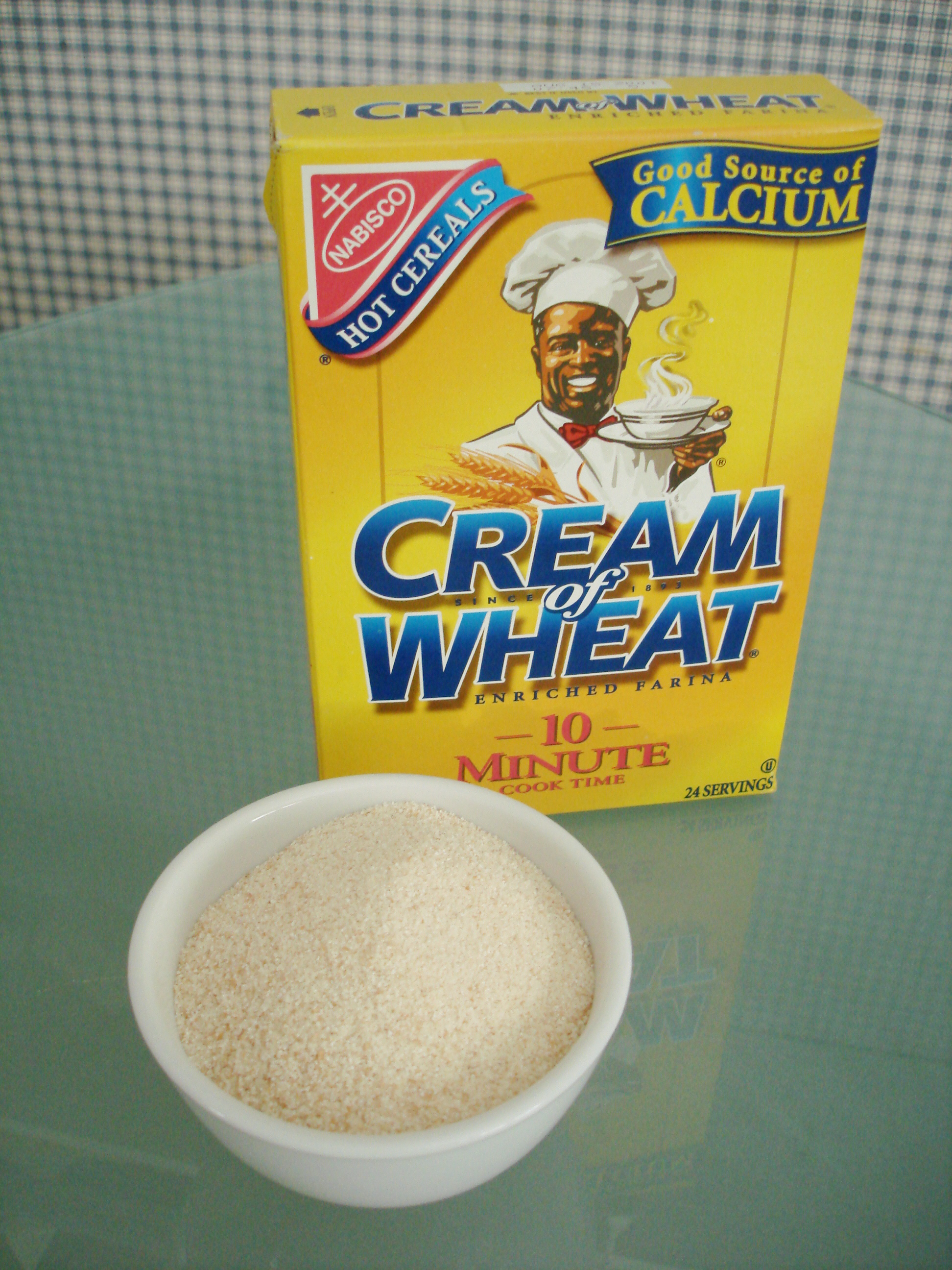
A box or carton of cereal

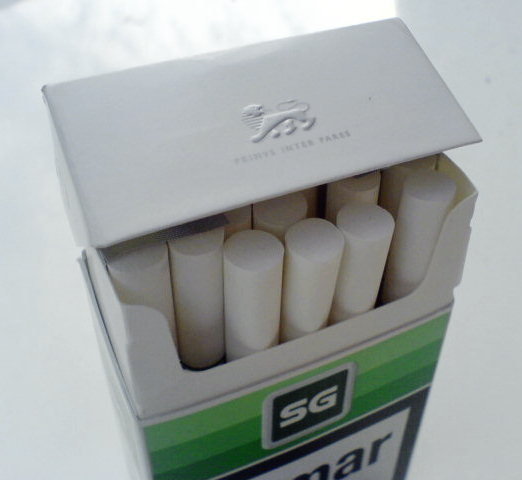
Hard cigarette pack or paperboard box

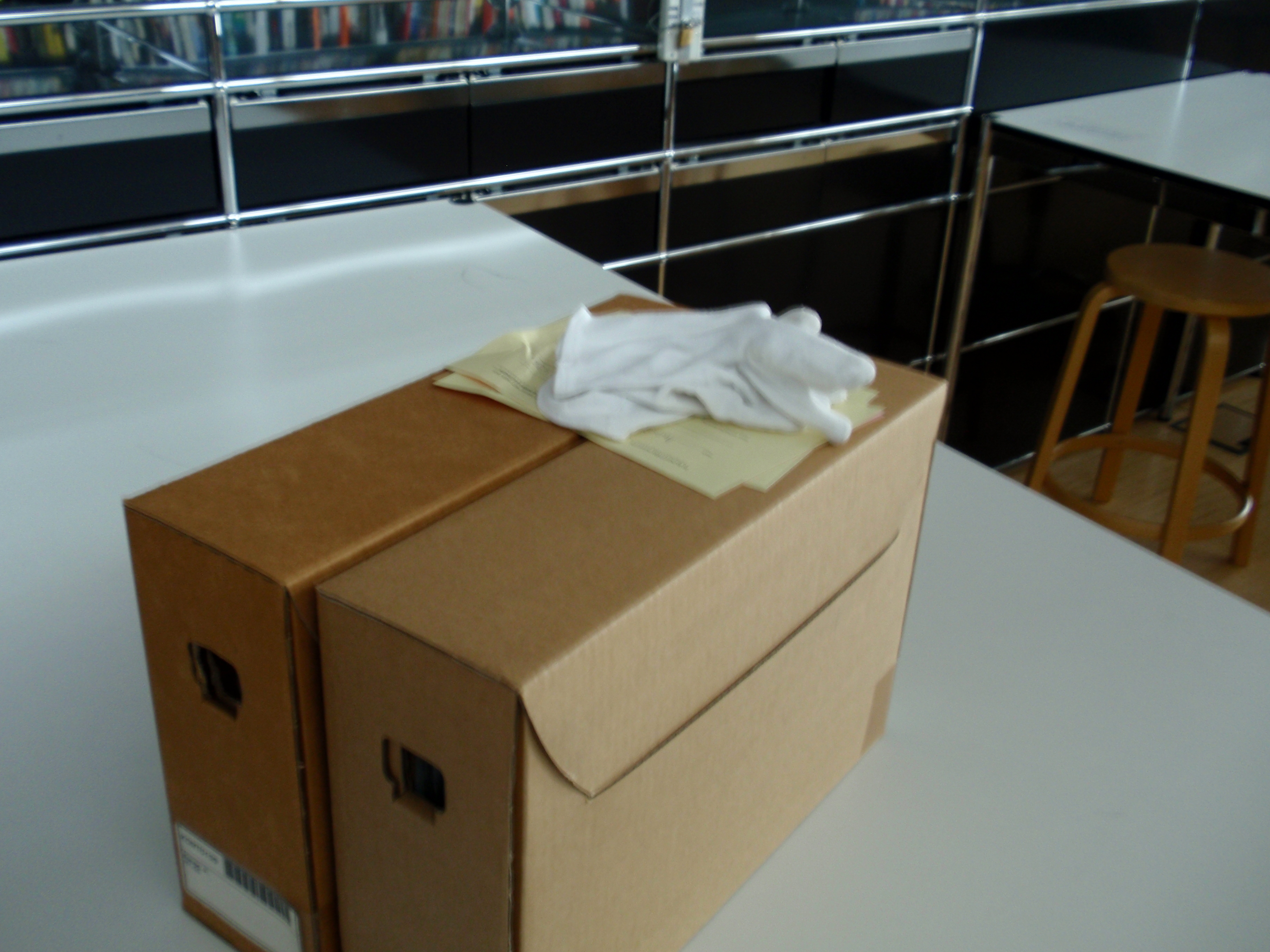
Corrugated box used for storage of archives

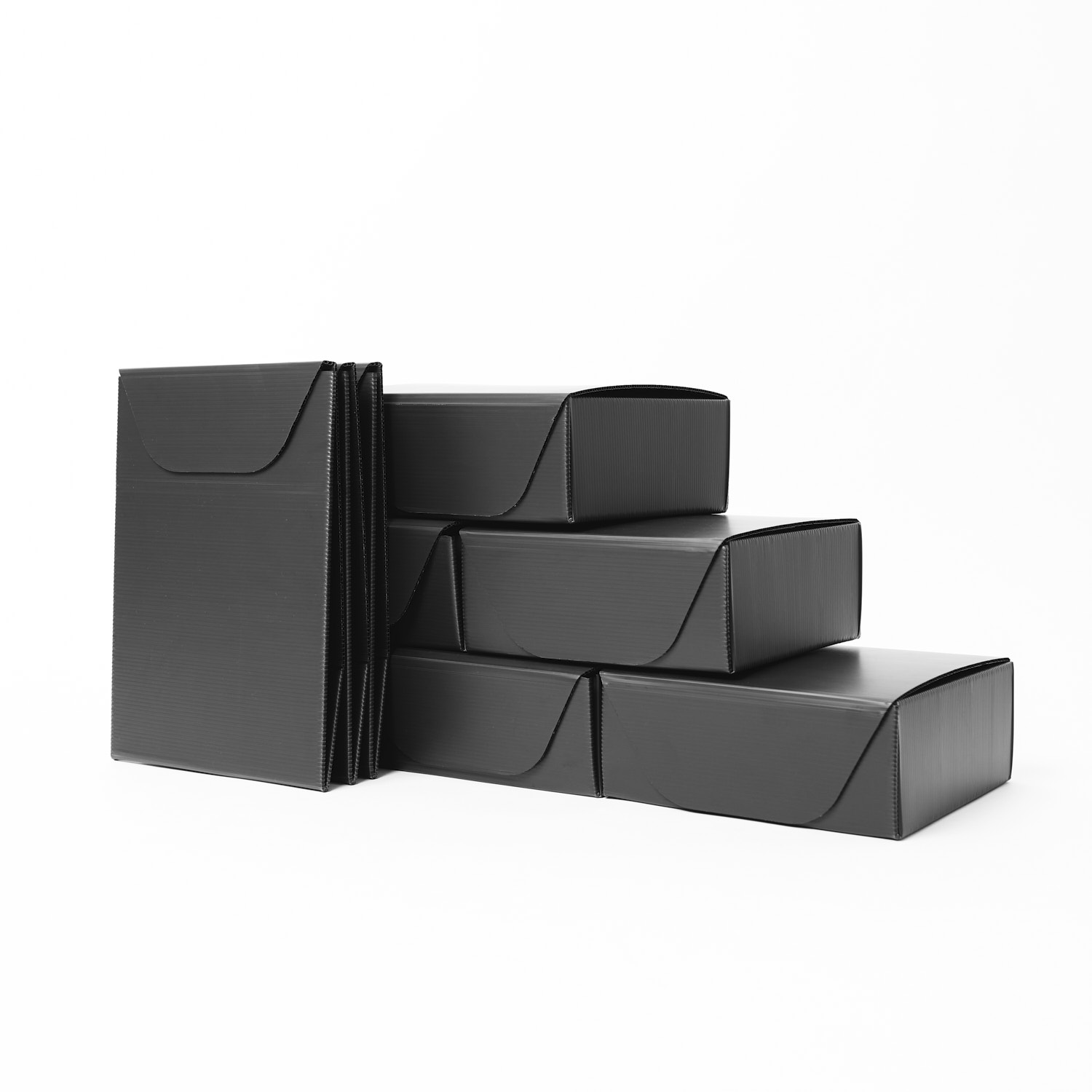
Reusable shipping boxes

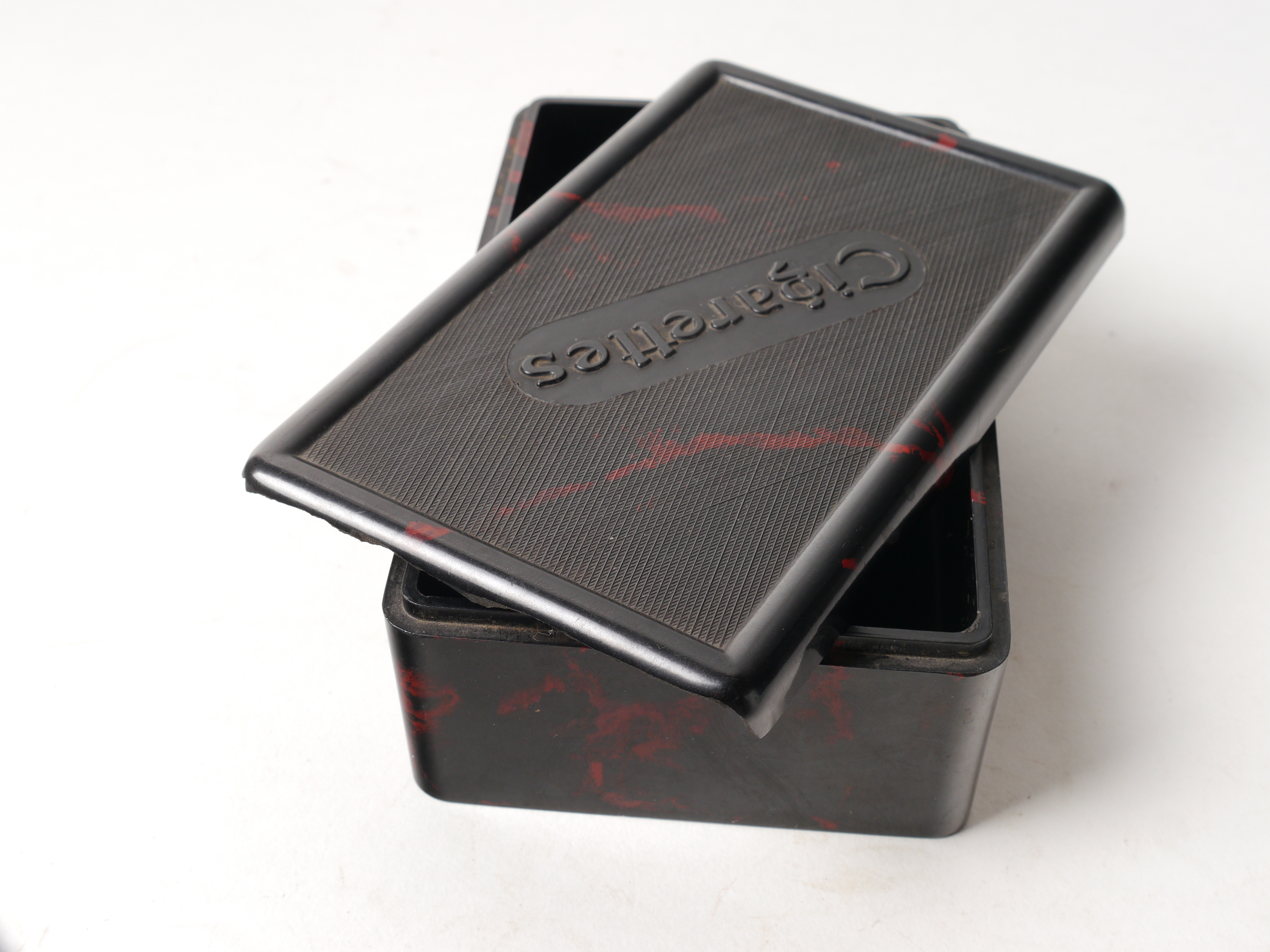
Box in bakelite for storing cigarettes. Manufactured by Vynckier in Ghent. Collection Museum of Industry Ghent.

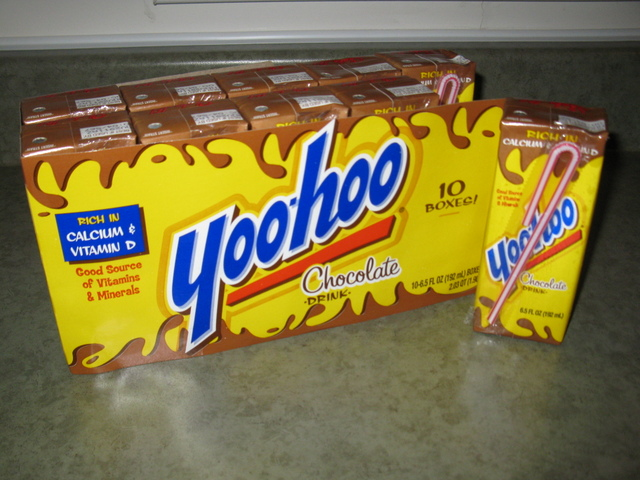
Drink boxes

Milk in gable-top carton

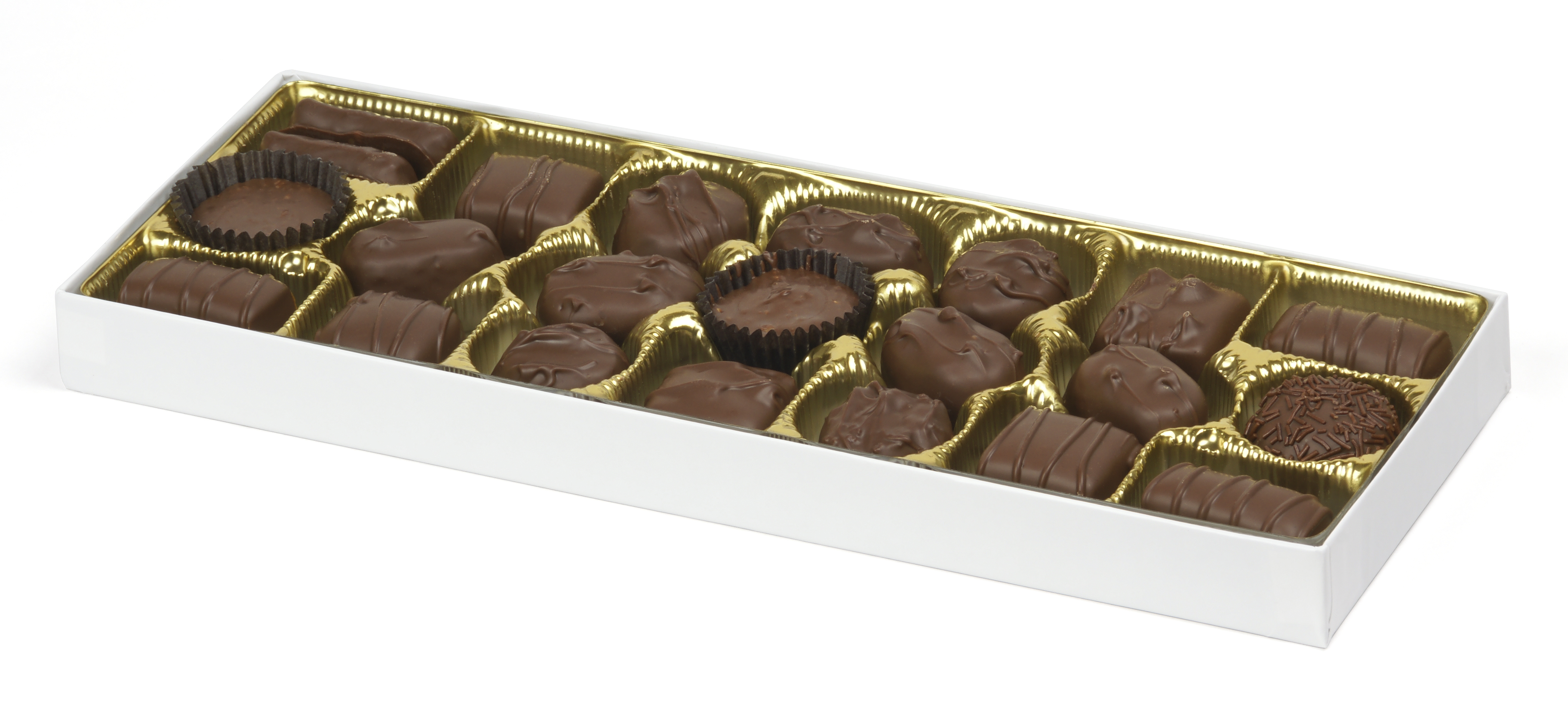
Set-up box made of non-bending paperboard

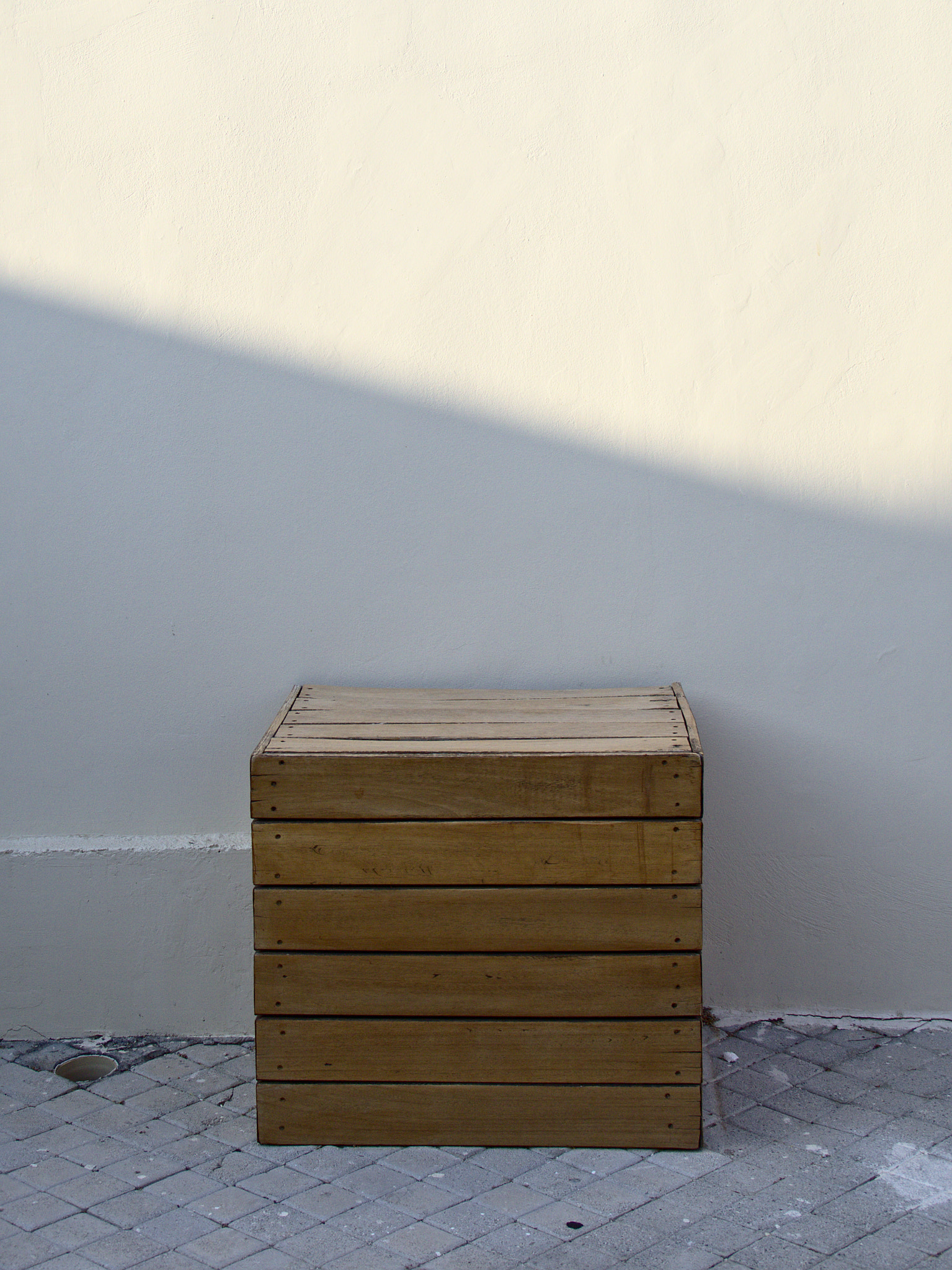
Wooden Box

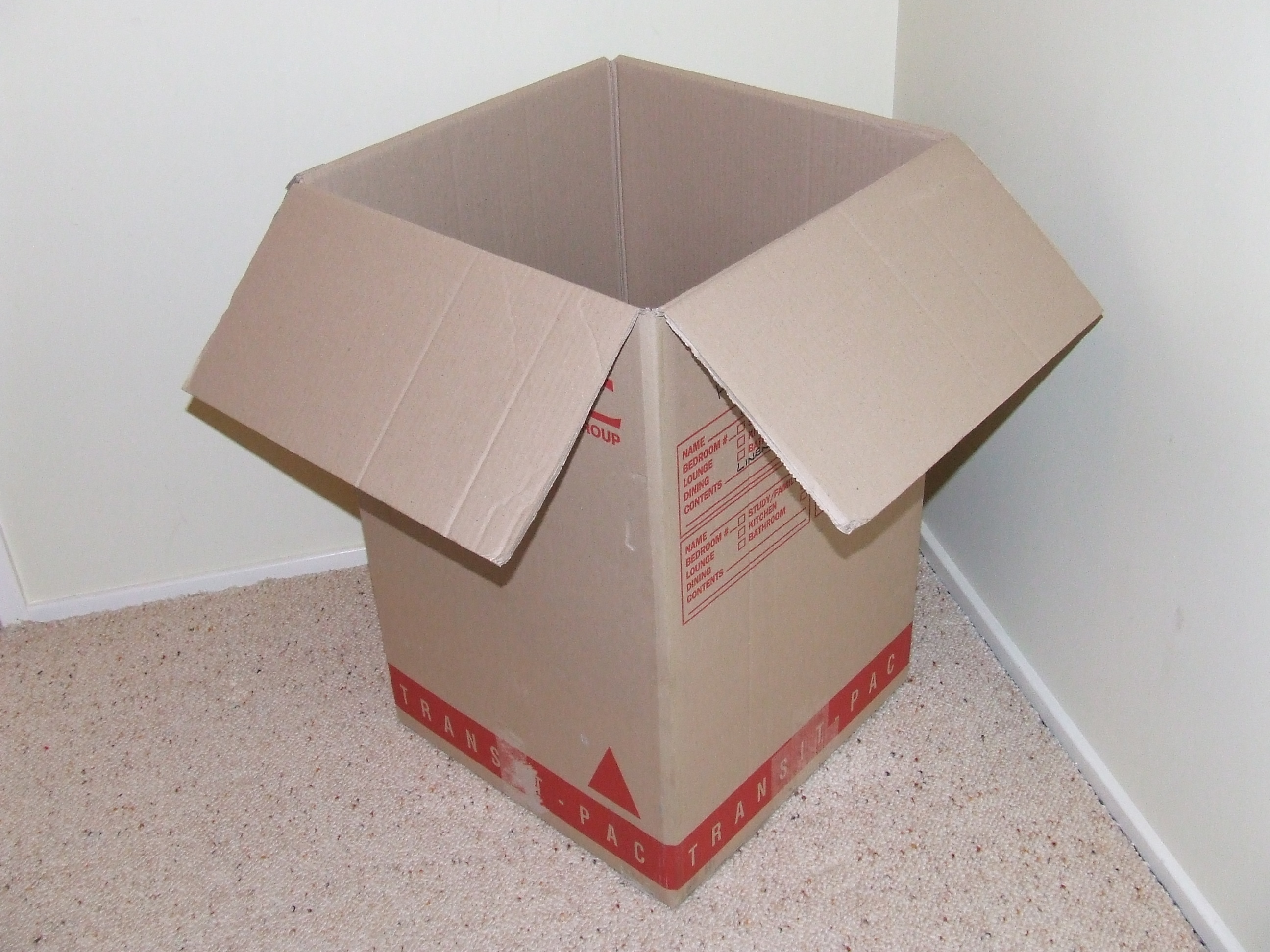
Moving box

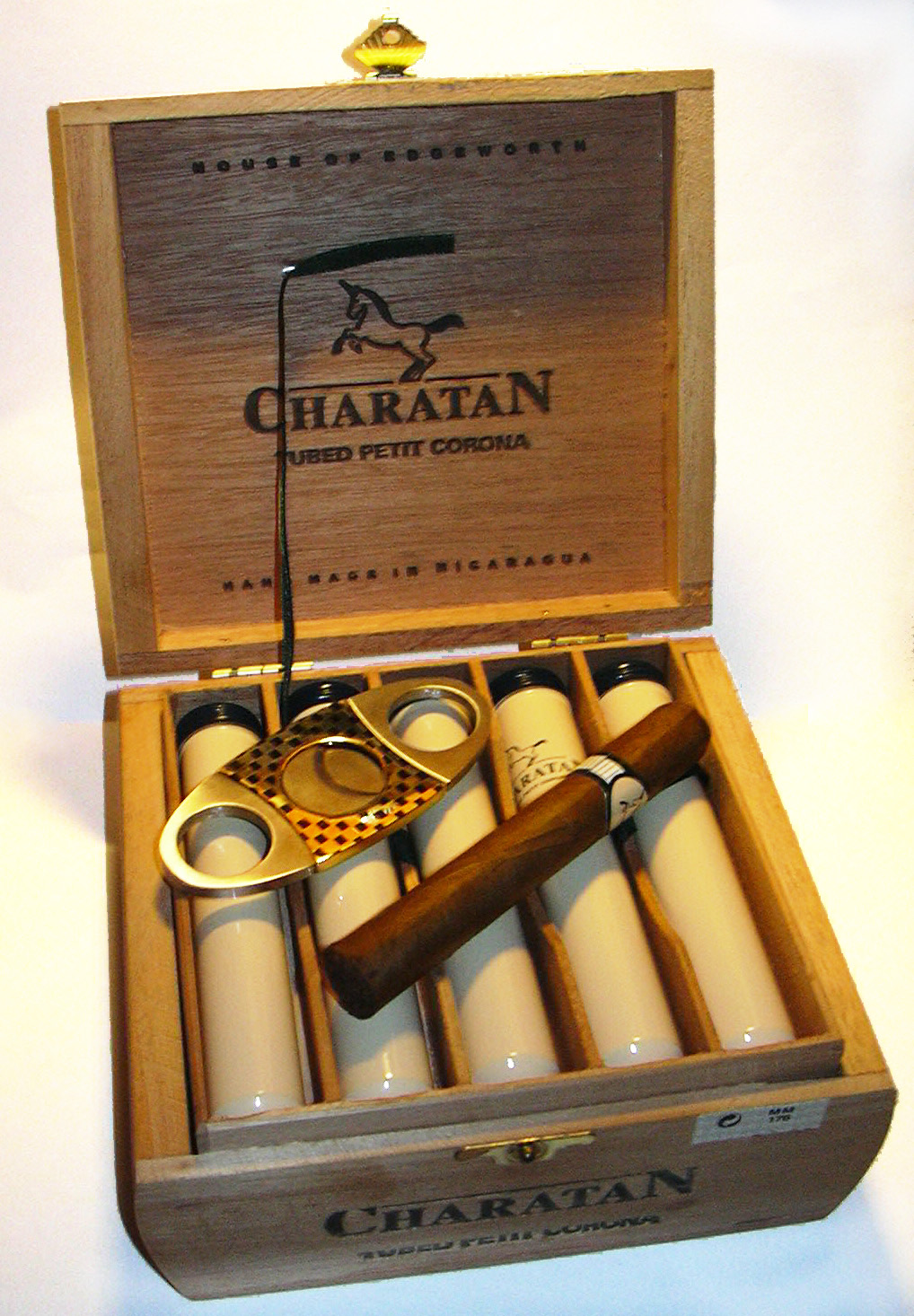
Cigar box

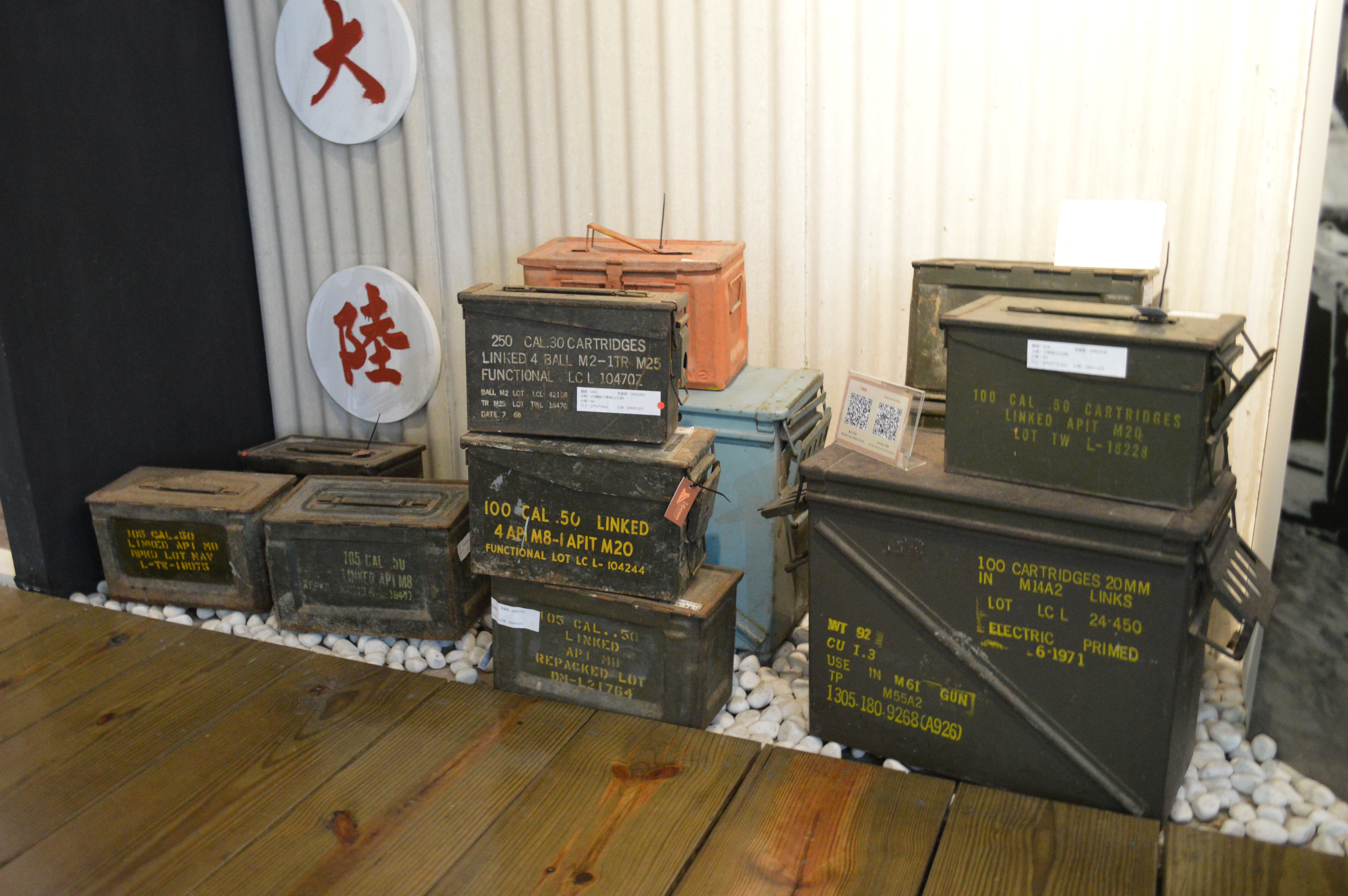
Ammunition boxes

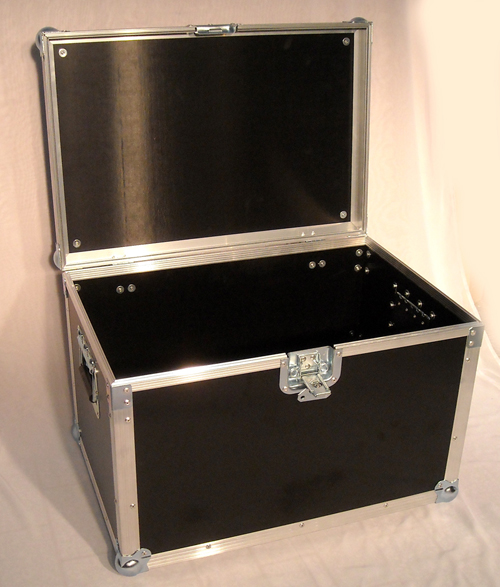
Reusable box or transit case

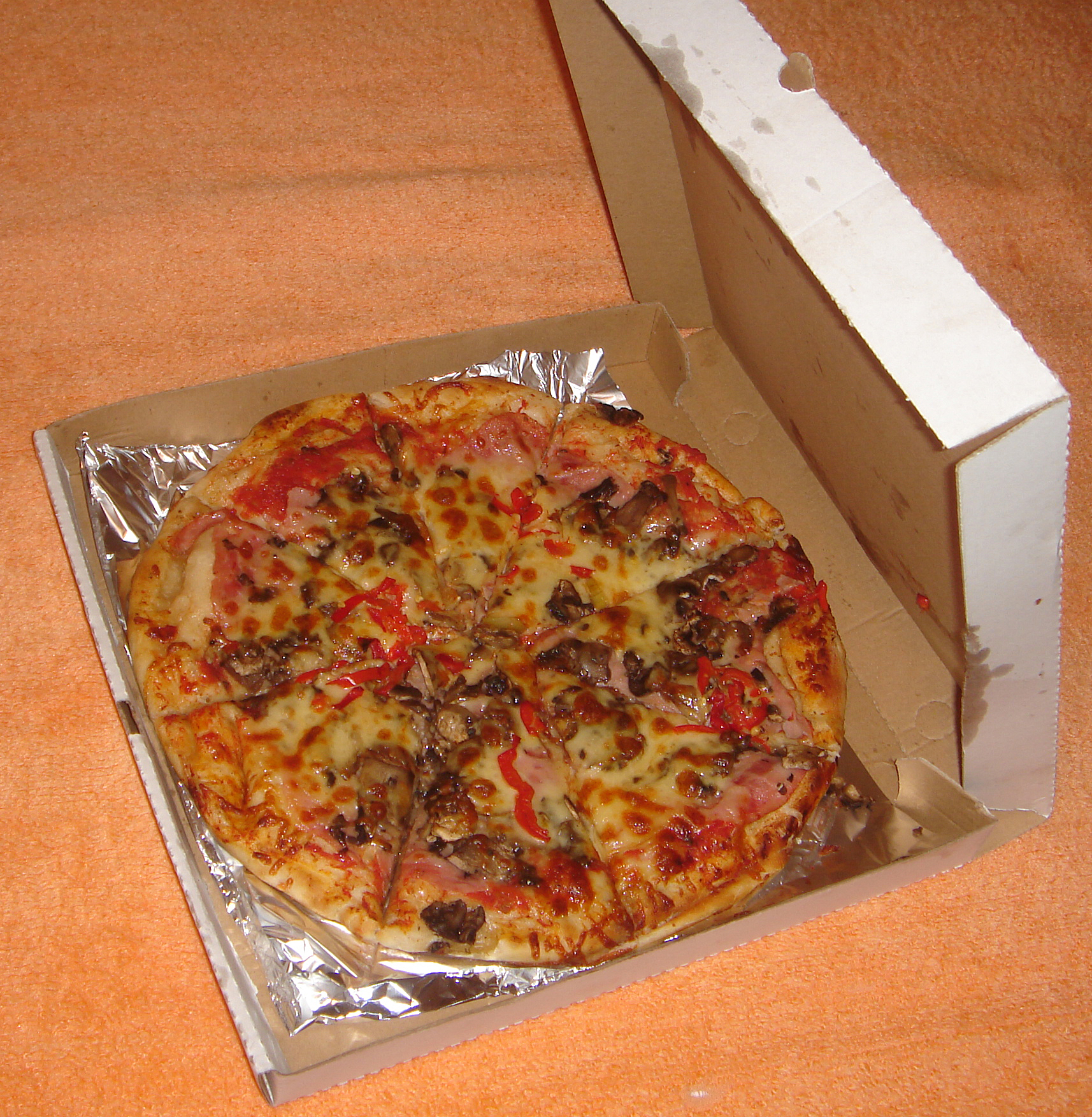
A corrugated box with a folding lid used for pizza

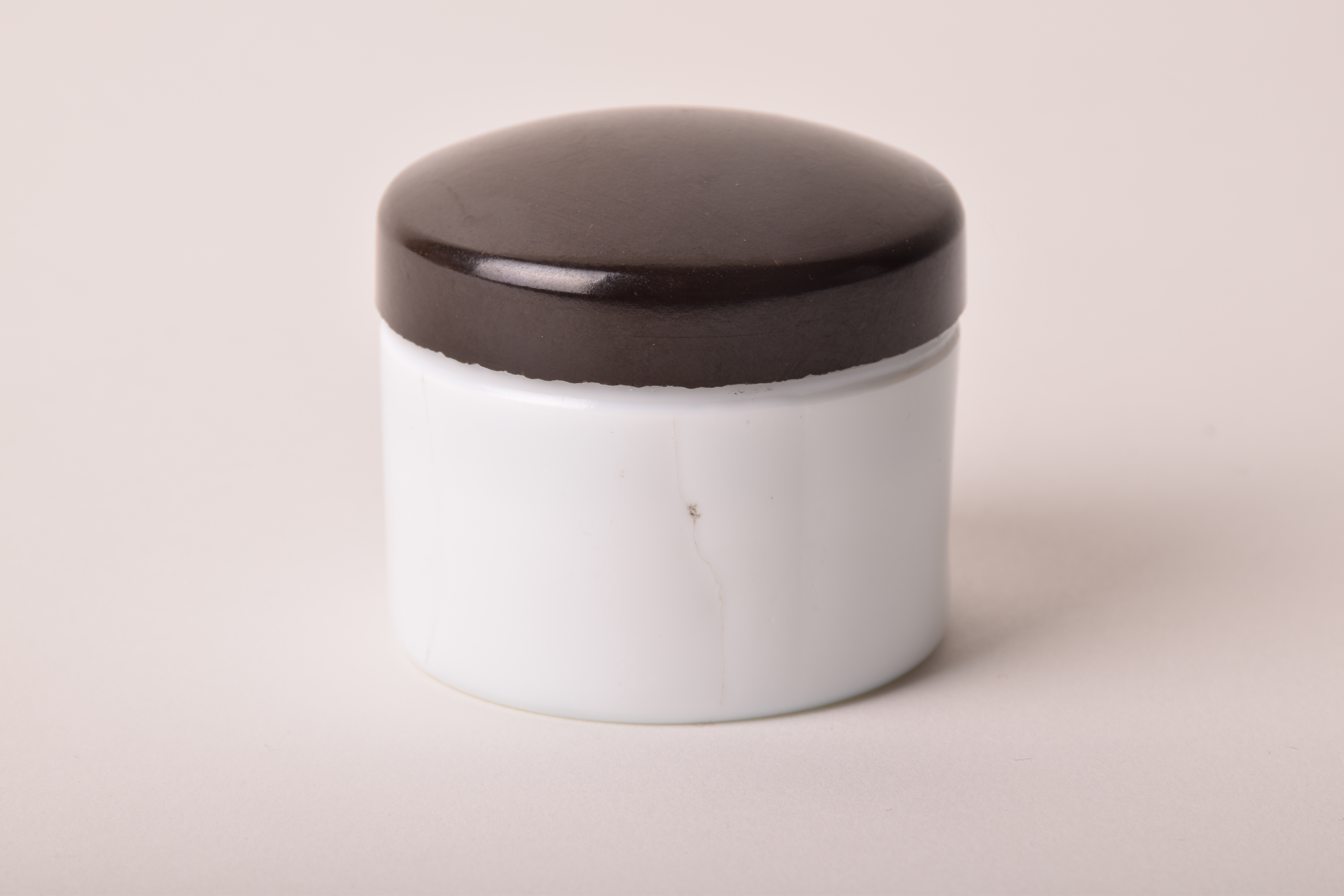
Round pill box in bakelite, collection Museum of Industry Ghent.

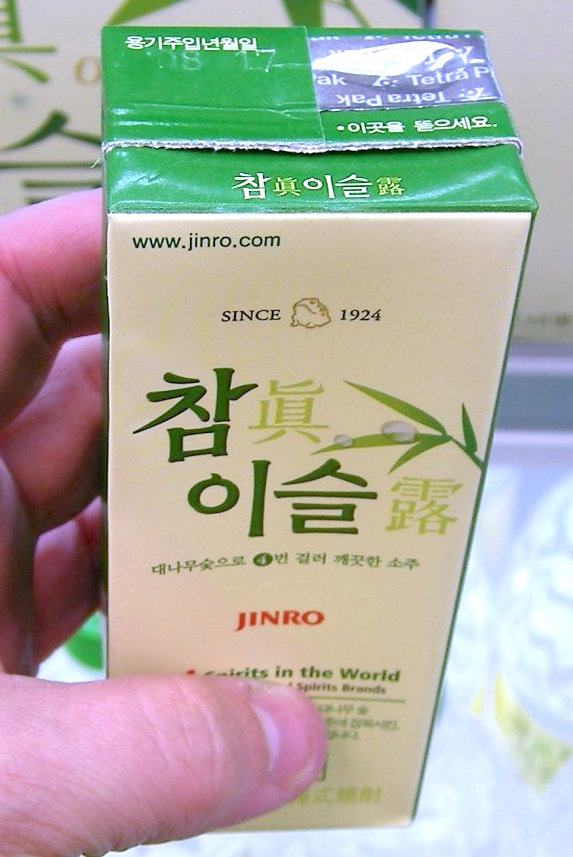
A juice box with soju

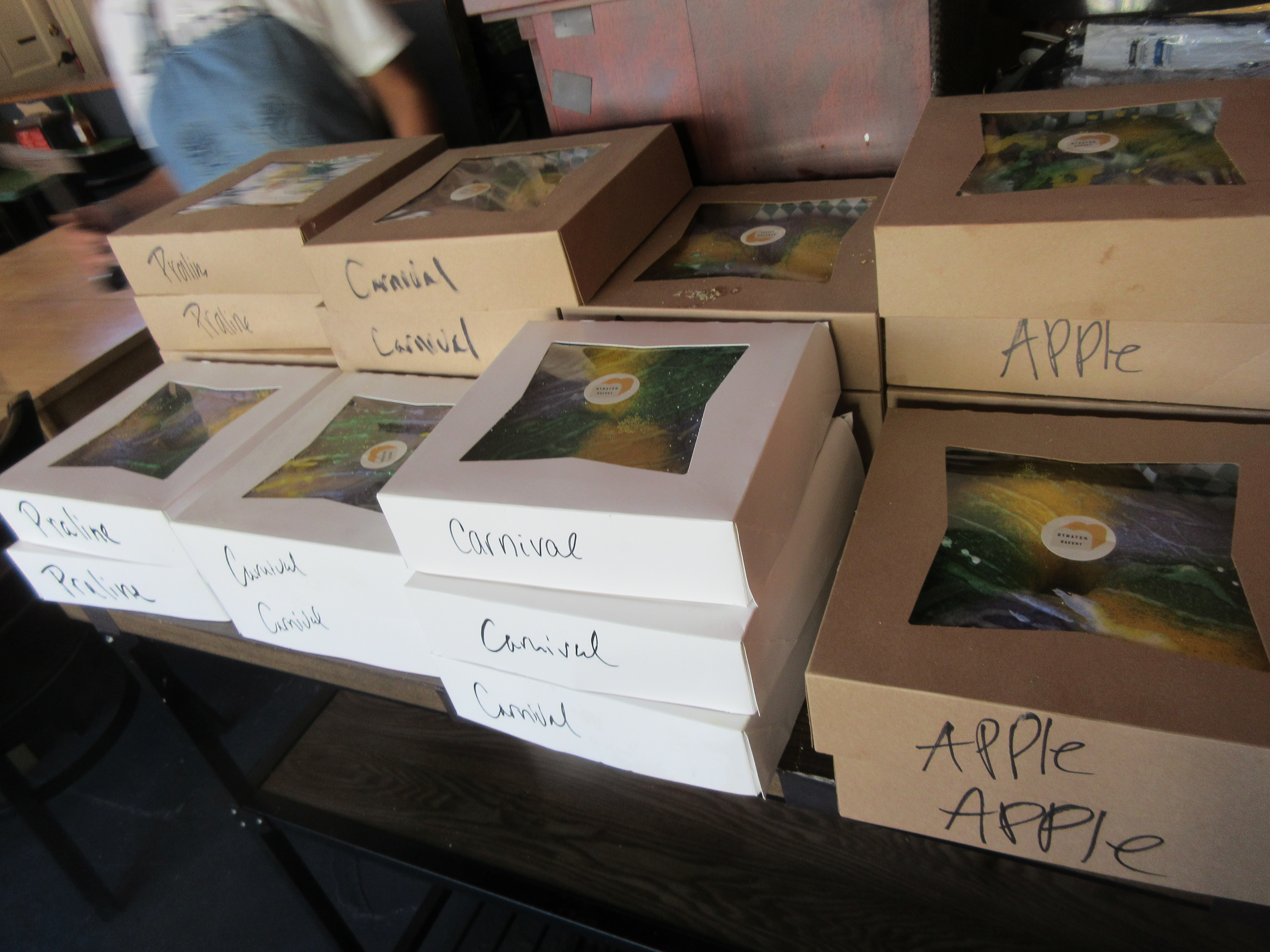
Cake boxes

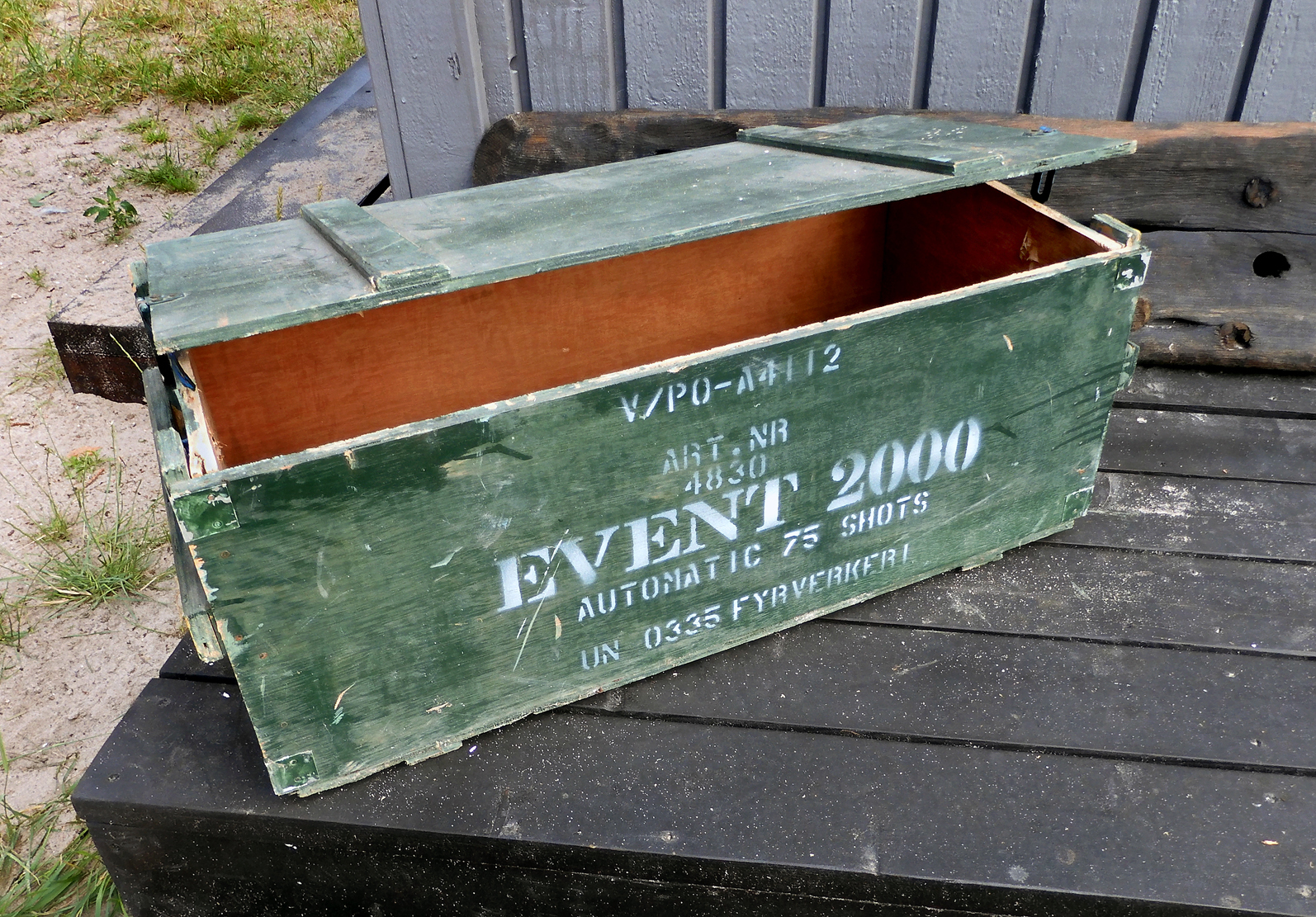
A wooden box for fireworks

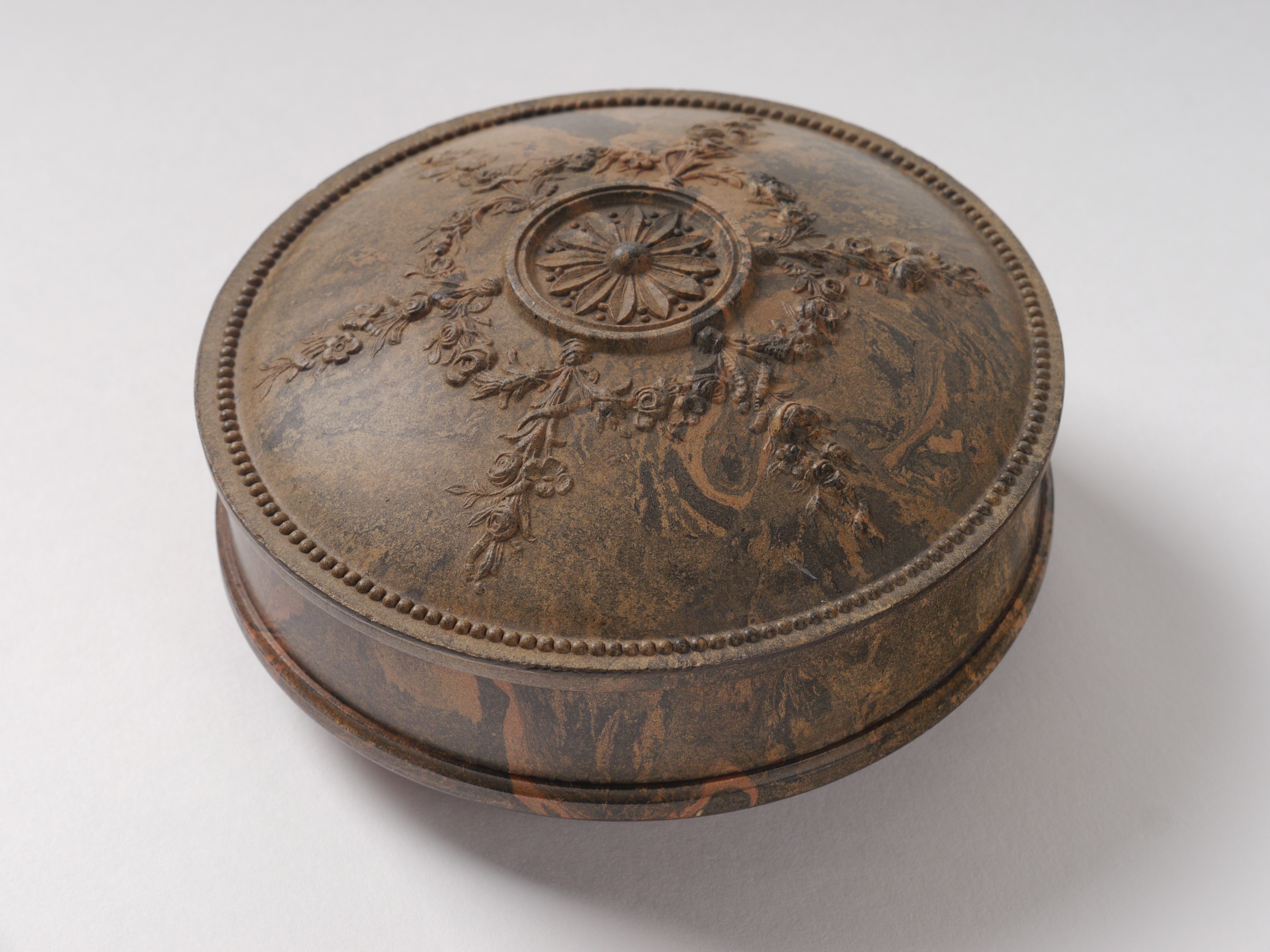
Round box manufactured by Ebena in Antwerp. Collection Museum of Industry Ghent.

== Bibliography ==
- Soroka, W, "Fundamentals of Packaging Technology", IoPP, 2002, ISBN 1-930268-25-4
- Yam, K. L., "Encyclopedia of Packaging Technology", John Wiley & Sons, 2009, ISBN 978-0-470-08704-6
