= TI-HI =

Term in logistics

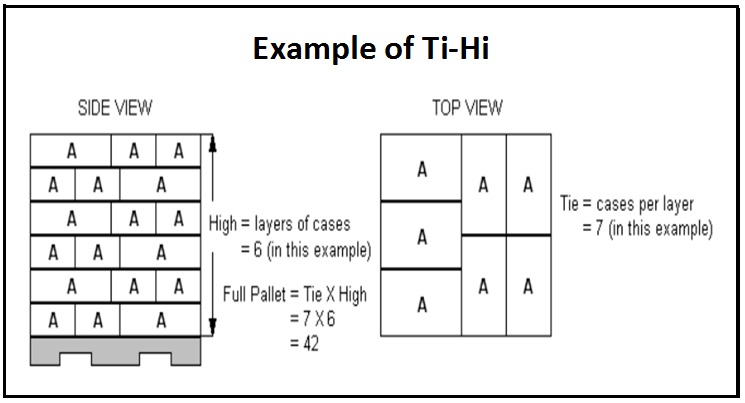

TI-HI, Ti-High, Tie-High, or Ti by Hi is a term often used in the logistics industry.

It refers to the number of boxes/cartons stored on a layer, or tier, (the TI) and the number of layers high that these will be stacked on the pallet (the HI). It can also be used in reference to the stacking pattern used to load a pallet in order to generate a relatively stable stack.

These measurements will usually be asked for following the Cube (cubic feet) of a Master Carton.

Some manufacturers design and stack boxes/cartons on pallets in non-standard Ti-Hi patterns. This stacking pattern does not compute logically to TI-HI applications. Pallets with non-standard Ti-Hi are unconventional.

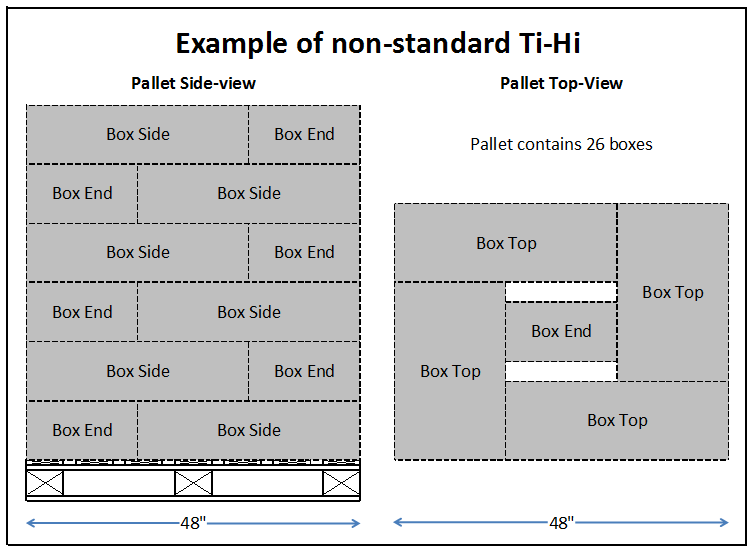
