= Liquid packaging board =

Water-resistant paperboard container

Typical construction

Liquid packaging board (LPB) is a type of composite paperboard used to make cartons that hold liquids. LPB is used extensively for packages that hold beverages such as milk or juice. Paperboard packages are often used in combination with aseptic processing techniques to produce shelf-stable products, including the Tetra Pak brand of paperboard containers.

Liquid packaging board is manufactured from multiple layers of paper, combined with layers of other materials such as aluminium foil or plastic. This layering gives LPB excellent wet strength, which is essential for preserving the quality of the product within the LPB packaging.

Only virgin paper fibers are used. The barrier coating must hold the liquid and prevent migration of air and flavors through the paperboard.

== History ==
The use of paperboard containers for packaging liquids began in the early 20th century, primarily in the dairy industry. Paper containers offered an alternative to distributing milk in reusable glass bottles. By the 1930s, dairies across the world were distributing milk in wax-coated paper containers.

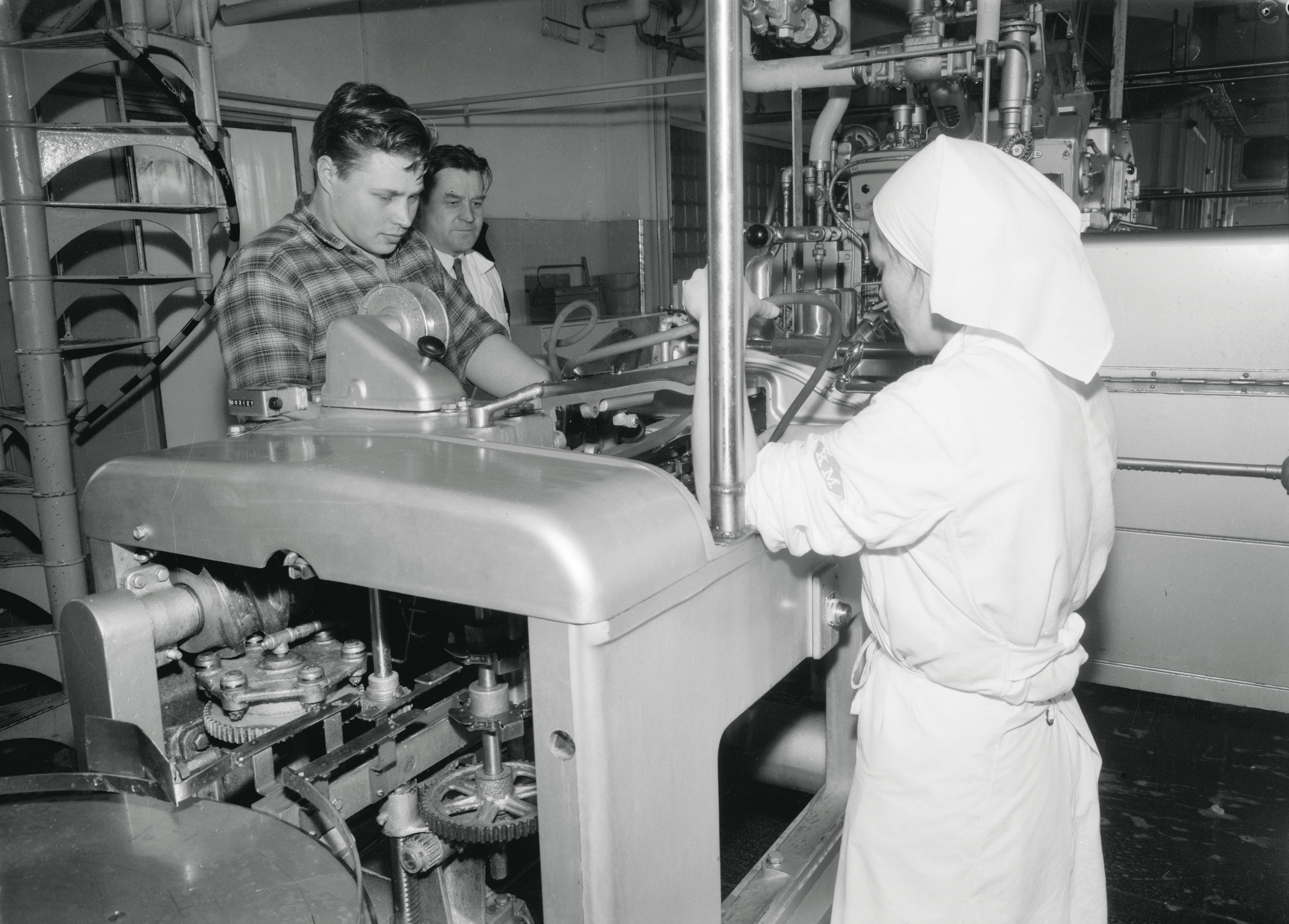
Pure-Pak carton machine in Finland, 1963

Liquid packaging board in its current form was developed in the 1950s, as plastic manufacturing technology improved. Polyethylene was introduced into paper carton manufacturing processes in the late 1950s, with the first polyethylene-coated Tetra Pak containers produced in 1956. The first LPB containers were tetrahedral, which inspired the Tetra Pak company's brand name. Tetrahedral containers were an innovation in manufacturing, but their shape was difficult for consumers to use. In the 1960s, the technology for both aseptic processing and paperboard packaging improved, allowing for shelf-stable products in brick-shaped (rectangular cuboid) paperboard packages.

== Manufacture ==
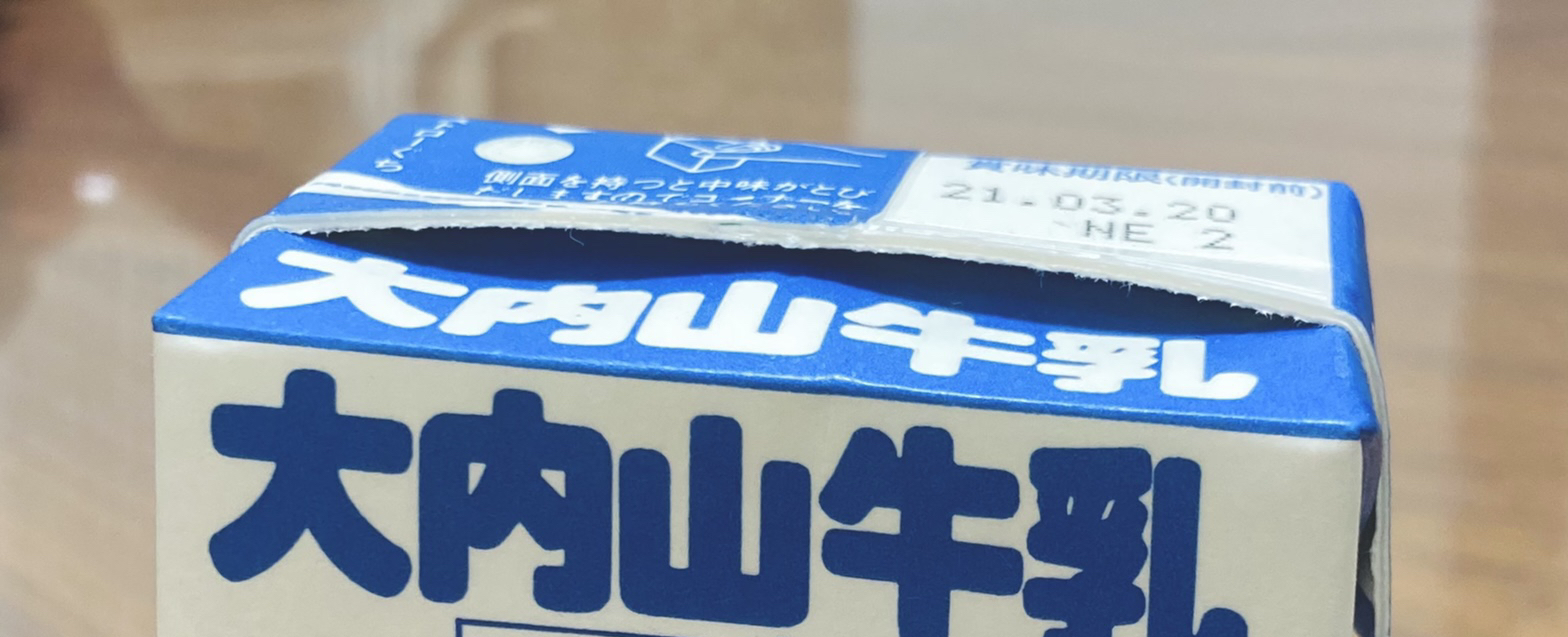
A milk carton in Japan made of liquid packaging board. The edge of the material is visible, showing multiple layers.

A liquid packaging board might be up to five plies and is formed on a multi-ply paper machine with online coating. The most common is to use three plies with a basis weight of about 300 g/m^{2}. The base or middle ply is normally made of pulp from bleached or unbleached chemical pulp, chemi-thermo-mechanical pulp (CTMP) or broke (waste paper from a paper machine). CTMP gives more bulk and stiffness. The top ply (inside) is made of bleached chemical pulp. The barrier coating depends on the application and might be applied on both sides. When induction welding is employed an aluminum foil layer is used for barrier protection and for heating. The back side of the board is the printing side and might have an extra ply made from chemical pulp of quality that is suitable for the printing applications. Liquid packages are normally heat sealed.

Cartons filled with short-shelf-life dairy products use board that are barrier coated on both sides with one layer of low density polyethylene. For long-shelf-life products it is common to use aluminium foil as barrier coating together with polyethylene. Commonly the plastic coating on the top side is 12 - 20 g/m^{2} and on the reverse side 15 - 60 g/m^{2}.

LPB packaging materials are often sold in the form of packaging systems, where one supplier provides the paperboard material itself and the machinery that forms and fills the packages. Sanitary and aseptic processing of food contact products are critical.

== Uses ==
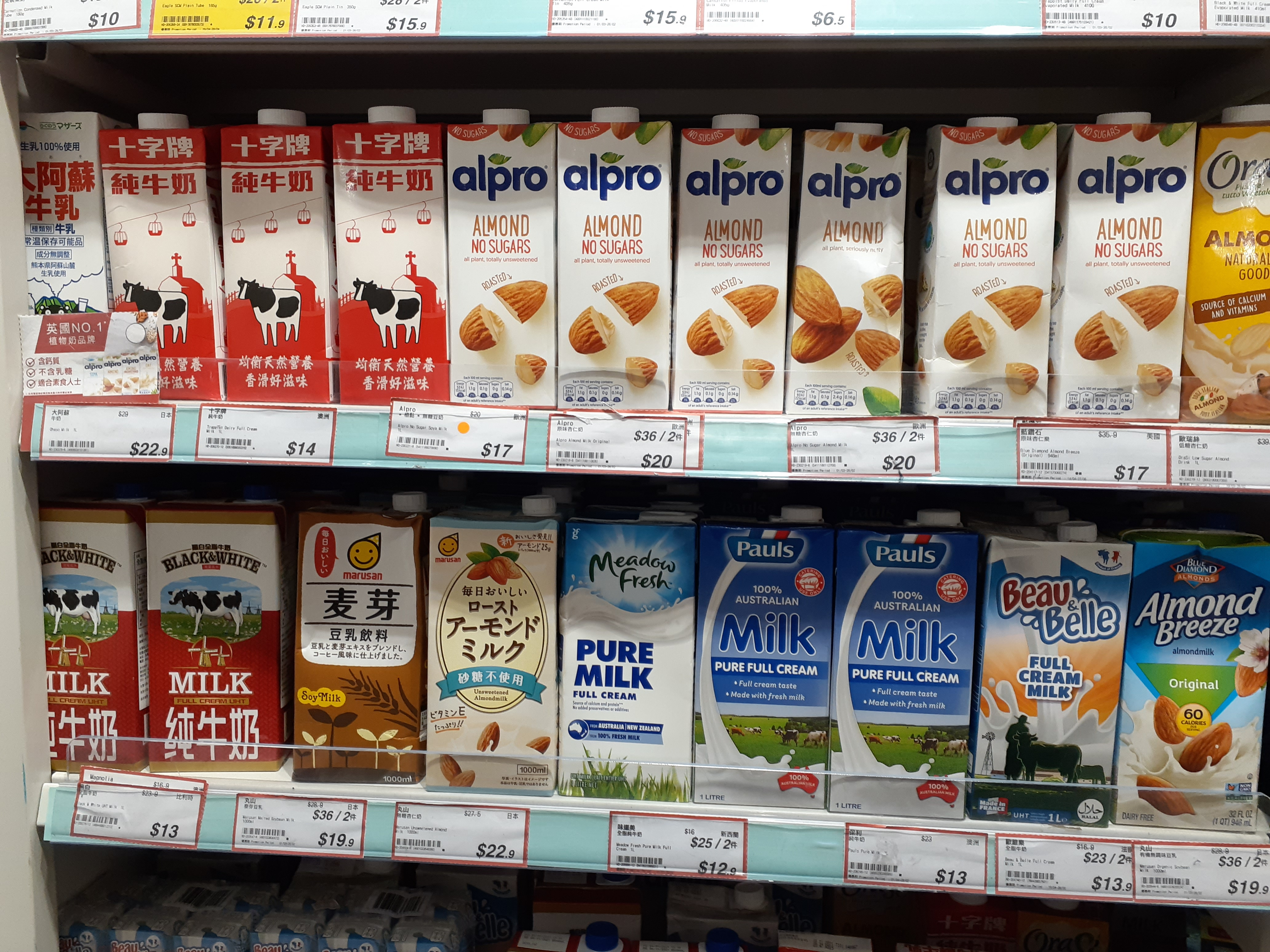
Shelf-stable products packaged in LPB packages in Hong Kong

Liquid Packaging Board (LPB) is traditionally associated with beverage packaging, including for milk, juiceboxes and other dairy products, but its applications extend beyond just liquids, encompassing a broad range of uses due to its strength, barrier properties, and versatility.

Liquid packaging board is used for two package types: brick and gable top cartons.

== See also ==
- Plastic-coated paper
- Tetra Brik
- Bag-in-box
