= Plastic coating =

Type of coating

Plastic coating is a term that is commonly used in technology but is nevertheless ambiguous. It can be understood to mean the coating of plastic (e.g., metallization of plastics) or the coating of other materials (e.g., electrical cable) with plastics.

== Polymer coating ==
A polymer coating is a form of plastic coating or surface coating and consists of a plastic base. There are also tribological polymer coatings that can be adapted to numerous application needs thanks to the variety of polymers available. The coating reduces friction and abrasion, thus preventing the product from wearing out due to corrosion and scratching.

=== Advantages ===
Coatings made of polymers can be produced from various compounds. They can therefore be applied to almost any surface. Polymer coatings are accordingly particularly suitable for places where plain bearings cannot be used. A tribological coating can be used, for example, where space is limited and access is difficult.

In addition, polymer coatings can be customized to suit a wide range of applications, such as particularly high-temperature environments or in the food industry.

The steps to prepare parts for coating with a polymer base are cost-effective compared to other coating options. In addition, the coated end products are consumer-friendly: coated parts are popular because liquids such as water and oil bead off when the surface is coated with a hydrophobic material. This makes it easier to maintain and clean the end products.

Furthermore, the color of the polymer coating can also be adjusted, however with some limitations. The reason for this is that more pigments are needed depending on the color shade, which ultimately influences the coating.

=== Applications ===
- Automotive industry: surface coating makes water and oil to bead off, that's why polymer coating is often used for various car accessories. An example is a car paint with ceramic sealing.
- Polymer coatings are also used in the aerospace industry.
- Other examples of applications include metal, flooring, or medical products, in particular since a polymer coating provides a permanently sterile surface.

== Metallization of plastics ==
=== Technical process ===
The application of ultra-fine metal coatings to plastic surfaces is becoming increasingly important.

- Dry process: High-vacuum evaporation, cathode sputtering, gas and metal plating, and conductive paint spraying. The high-vacuum technique only works if the plastic does not produce gas. In gas plating, unlike the other processes, the metal is formed in situ from volatile compounds that are easily decomposed thermally (e.g., nickel tetracarbonyl) by a chemical reaction, and the metal mirror (possibly on a previously stripped plastic surface, e.g., acrylonitrile-butadiene-styrene graft copolymer) is then deposited on the plastic.
- Wet process

== Plastic coating of materials ==
The coating process is also called coating technology. Of particular technical importance is the coating of all kinds of materials with plastics. One example is cable sheathing for electrical cables or the coating of cutlery baskets in dishwashers.

=== Technical process ===
- Fluidized bed sintering
- Electrostatic powder spraying, also tribo-coating
- Dipping process
- Flame spray

Theoretically, coatings are also plastic-like coatings. A boundary can be drawn by whether a reaction or crosslinking of the coating takes place (automotive clear coat) or whether a plastic merely melts and solidifies on the surface (vortex sintering with thermoplastics), but the transitions are fluid. As a rule, plastic coatings have significantly higher film thicknesses than conventional paint.

For polymer coating, powder coating is commonly used. There are also options for wet coating, vacuum coating, dip coating, or thermal spraying. The coating can be applied to a polymer or a polymeric material.
