= Museum of Industry (Ghent) =

Museum in Ghent, Belgium

Coordinates: 51.0596°N 3.7249°E

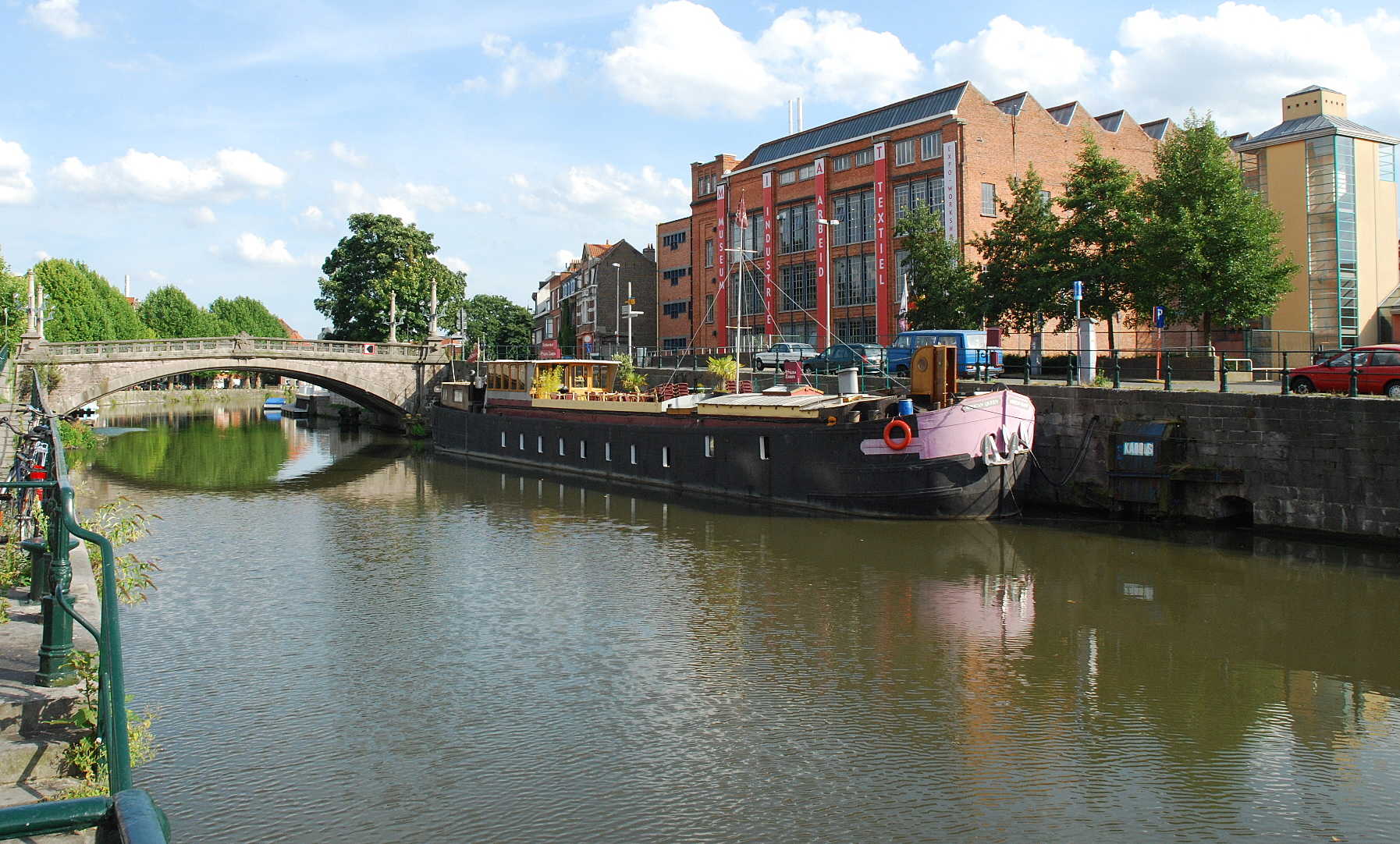
View of MIAT at Ghent

The Museum of Industry, Work and Textiles (Dutch: Museum over industrie, arbeid en textiel, or MIAT) (Note: The museum was formally known under the same acronym as the Museum of Industrial Archeology and Textiles (Dutch: Museum voor Industriële Archeologie en Textiel).) is a museum in Ghent in Belgium. Ghent was at the centre of the Flanders textile region. The museum is an Anchor point on the European Route of Industrial Heritage.

== Building ==
The first business recorded on this site was that of Pieter Van Huffel. The contract he won in 1819, allowed him to purchase a steam engine for his cotton mill. Around 1830 he built adjoining weaving sheds. Pierre Guequier and Ferdinand Dierman took over the company in 1845 and started building, but in 1854 Guequier bought out his partner. By 1864 he had formed a new company with his son-in-law Adolphe Desmet and the mills became known as the 'Desmet-Guequier & Compagnie' factory. Even so, the Desmet-Guequier factory was one of the smaller mills in Ghent: at the beginning of 1862 it had 99 employees. The profitability of a cotton mill is determined by its size.

Ghent suffered during the Lancashire Cotton Famine between 1861 and 1865 when imports of American long staple cotton halted and so did Ghent's mills. Desmet-Guequier's financial difficulties were no exception, they survived thanks to capital injections from a succession of new backers.

The current building was built in 1905 on fireproof principles. The industry is cyclical, after the good times at the turn of the century, eight of Ghent's cotton mills merged to form the Union Cotonnière in 1914, and the Desmet-Guequier factory was taken over.

By the 1950s low wages were the cause of unrest. The three large manual trade unions led mass demonstrations for increased wages, and they were joined by white-collar workers from the various Union Cotonnière sites. But to no avail. In 1975 Union Cotonnière closed the division on the Oudevest and the building was left empty.

=== Collections ===
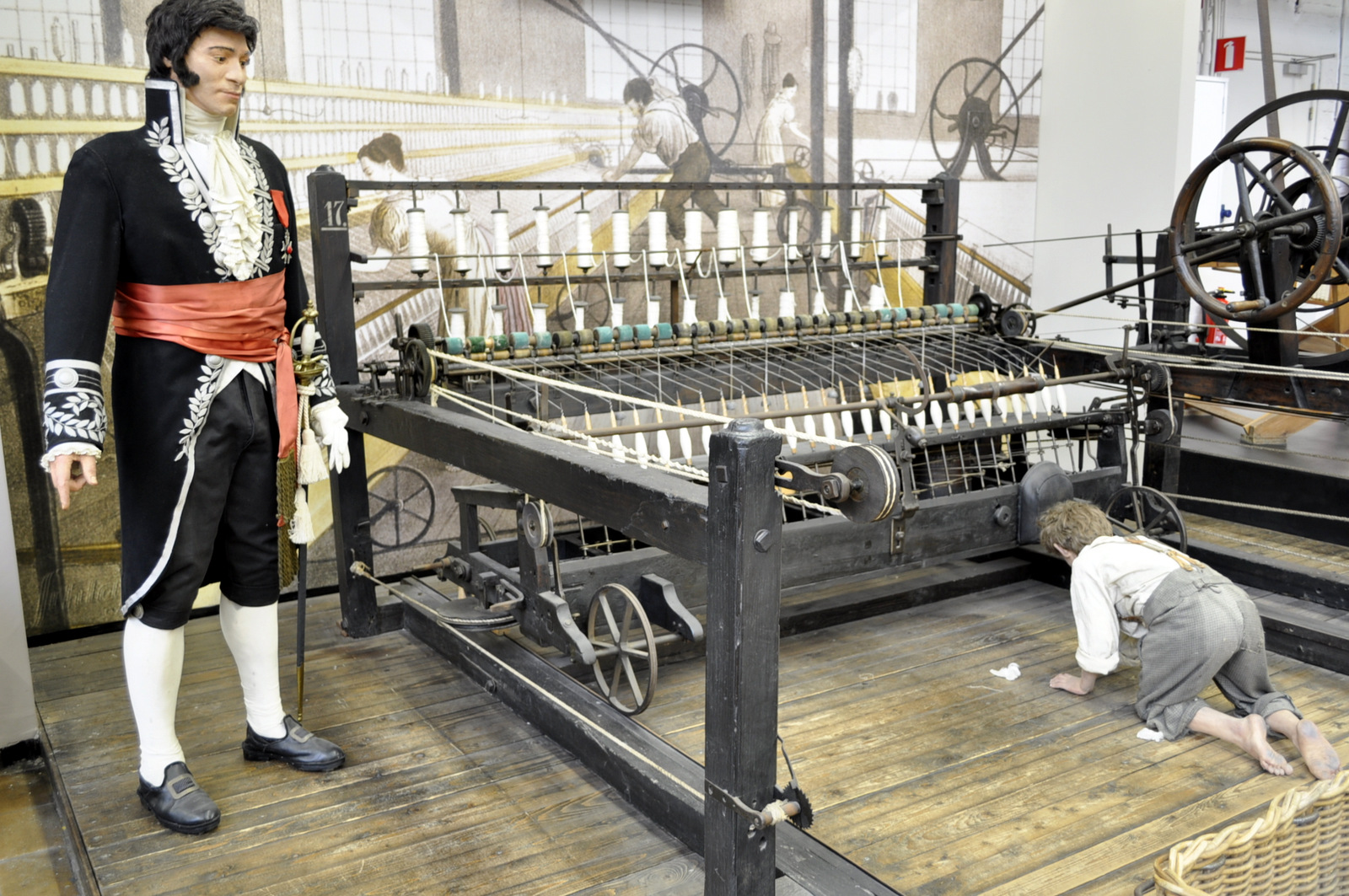
Lieven Bauwens and the Mule Jenny he imported in 1789

The MIAT collection started in 1977 contains over 30,000 objects. Its finest works include a Mule Jenny and the twiner dating from 1789, which both feature on the Flemish Government's Masterpiece Decree list. The Mule jenny was the actual machine illicitly exported from England by Lieven Bauwens in 1798. On the five floors of the mill, levels 3,4& 5 are given over to the permanent exhibition, Only 3% of the collection is displayed. Natural light photography is permitted. A whole storey is dedicated to textile manufacture. A storey is dedicated to the sociology of industry with topics such as child labour. Pierre De Geyter, who wrote the music to “The Internationale” was born locally so is honoured with a bronze statue. It is displayed in the colour garden which contains around 40 plants that were once used for making textile-dyes.

== See also ==
- Belgium in the long nineteenth century
