= Carton =

Type of domestic container

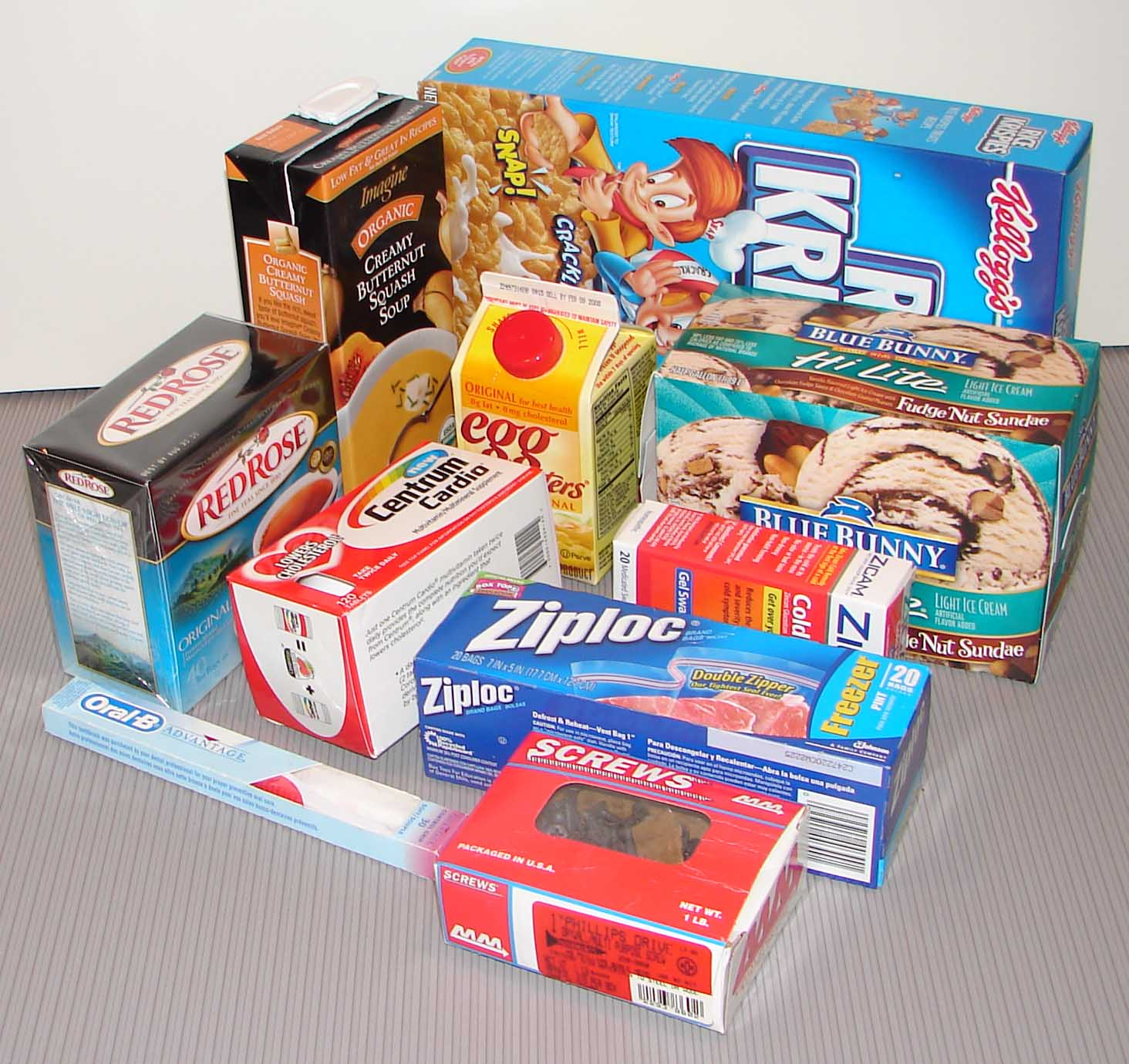
Examples of several types of cartons for different products

A carton is a box or container usually made of liquid packaging board (LPB), paperboard and sometimes of corrugated fiberboard. Many types of cartons are used in packaging. Sometimes a carton is also called a box.

== Types of cartons ==
=== Folding cartons ===
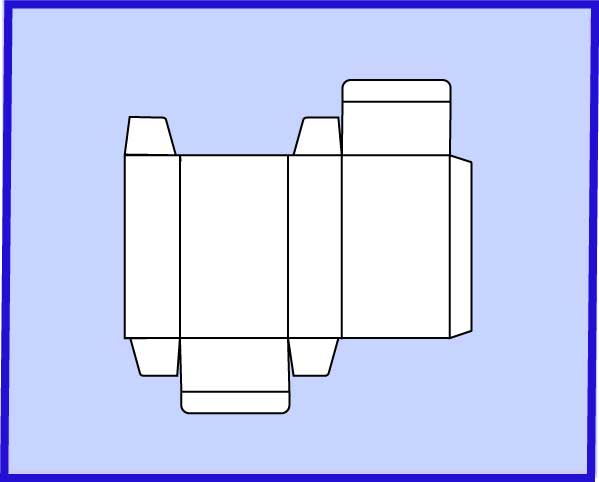
Typical blank for folding carton

A carton is a type of packaging typically made from paperboard that is suitable for food, pharmaceuticals, hardware, and many other types of products. Folding cartons are usually combined into a tube at the manufacturer and shipped flat (knocked down) to the packager. Tray styles have a solid bottom and are often shipped as flat blanks and assembled by the packager. Some also are self-erecting. High-speed equipment is available to set up, load, and close the cartons.

=== Egg carton ===
Molded pulp egg cartons, Japan

Egg cartons or trays are designed to protect whole eggs while in transit. Traditionally, these have been made of molded pulp. This uses recycled newsprint which is molded into a shape which protects the eggs. More recently, egg cartons have also been made from expanded polystyrene and PET.

=== Aseptic carton ===
Cartons for liquids can be fabricated from laminates of liquid packaging board (LPB), foil, and polyethylene. Most are based on either Tetra Pak or SIG Combibloc systems. One option is to have the printed laminate supplied on a roll. The carton is cut, scored, and formed at the packager. A second option is to have the pre-assembled tubes delivered to the packaging plant for completion and filling. These are suited for aseptic processing and are used for milk, soup, juice, etc. Paperboard-based cartons are lighter compared to a similarly sized steel can, but are harder to recycle. Some open-loop recycling operations pelletize or flatten ground-up cartons for use in building materials; closed-loop recycling is possible by separating the layers before processing, though some recyclers only recycle the cardboard fibers.

=== Perga carton ===
Perga cartons entered production in 1932 as a leak-proof can after they were produced locally during World War 1. Jagenberg Werke AG, in Düsseldorf, Germany, patented the design. The carton had a ribbed texture and paper sleeves covered in paraffin material, which provided a seamed structure from base to lid. Most cartons had a capacity of 200 mL. Development of the carton slowed during World War II, but the design would see a revival within European markets in the 1960s.

=== Gable top ===
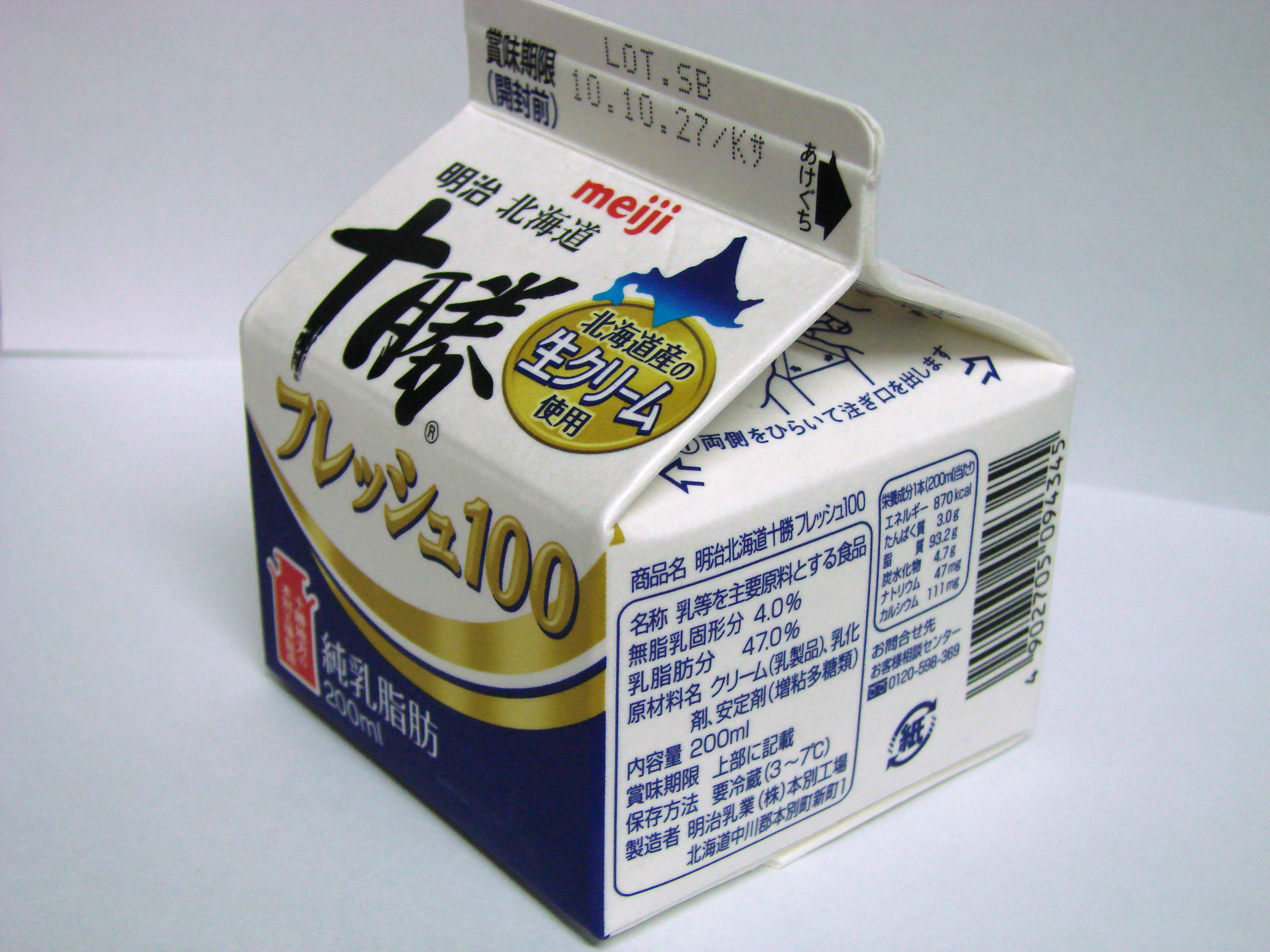
Gable top carton of cream

Gable top cartons are often used for liquid products such as milk, juice, etc. These use polyethylene-coated paperboard or other liquid packaging board (LPB) and sometimes a foil laminate. Most are opened by pushing open the gables at the top back and pulling the top (spout) out. Some have fitments to assist in opening and eating the contents.

=== Waxed paperboard beverage carton (historical) ===
Cuboid waxed paperboard beverage, a formed waxed paperboard plug crimped and sealed, preceded gabled polyethylene-coated paperboard cartons. Waxed paper straws were used to drink. Borden distributed milk in this way.

== Packaging history ==
=== Folded carton ===
The Paper Container trade journal dates the first commercial cardboard box production to the firm M. Treverton & Son, of England, in 1817. At around the same time card cartons appeared in Germany, to ship and house board games, an early example being The Game of Besieging. In 1879, Robert Gair, in Brooklyn, New York, operated a factory that die-ruled, cut, and scored paperboard into a single impression of a folded carton. Gair had the idea to combine folding and cutting into a single operation, after a creasing rule on a paper seed bag printing machine malfunctioned and cut through a bag.

By 1896, the National Biscuit Company was the first to use cartons to package crackers.

=== Milk carton ===
In 1908, Dr. Winslow, of Seattle, Washington, described paper milk containers that were commercially sold in San Francisco and Los Angeles as early as 1906. The inventor of this carton was G.W. Maxwell. Later, in 1915 John Van Wormer of Toledo, Ohio, received the a patent for the gable-topped, wax-coated, "paper bottle," a folded blank box for holding milk, calling it the "Pure-Pak." The milk carton could be folded, glued, filled with milk, and sealed at a dairy farm. In 1953, Seok-kyun Shin introduced the gable-topped milk carton to Korea. In the 1960s, Mario Lepore, a Detroit engineer designed a machine to fold and seal a gable top paper carton.

In 1957 paper milk carton company Kieckhefer Container Co. merged with the Weyerhauser Timber Company of Tacoma, Washington.

== Shape ==
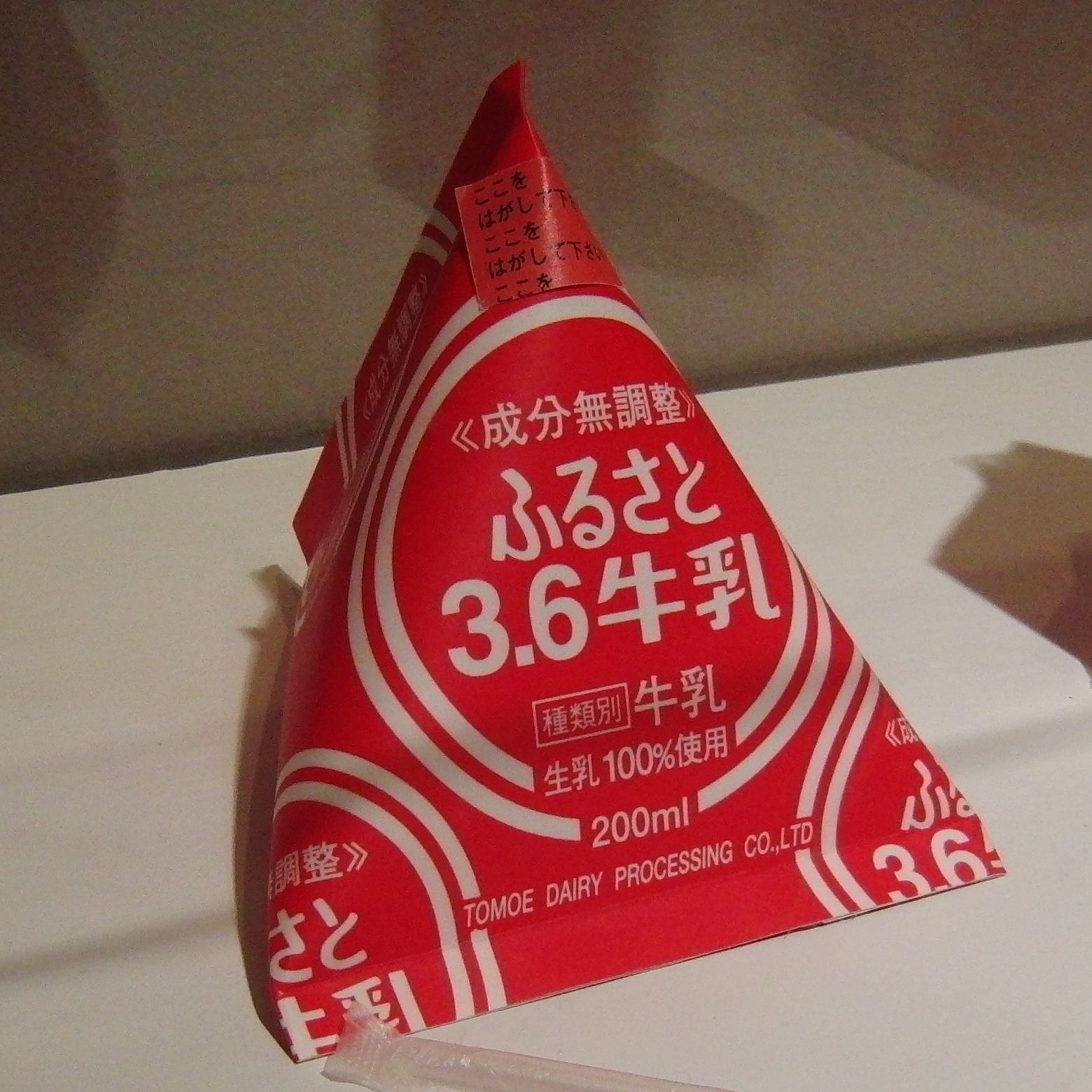
Tetrahedral carton of milk

Although quite often shaped like a cuboid, it is not uncommon to find cartons lacking right angles and straight edges, as in squrounds used for ice cream.

Tetrahedrons and other shapes are available. Cartons with a hexagonal or octagonal cross sections are sometimes used for specialty items.

== Materials ==
Cartons can be made from many materials: paperboard, duplex, white kraft, recycled and many more various plastics, or a composite. Some are "food grade" for direct contact with foods. Many cartons are made out of a single piece of paperboard. Depending on the need, this paperboard can be waxed or coated with polyethylene to form a moisture barrier. This may serve to contain a liquid product or keep a powder dry.

== Artistic design and other imagery ==
In art history, the carton (pronounced the French way) was a drawing on heavy pasteboard or paperboard, used as life-size design for the manufacture in an atelier of a valuable tapestry, such as a gobelin. During the weaving it hung behind the tapestry in the making, a time-consuming process thus in a creative sense simplified to 'mechanical' painting-by-numbers.

As these were extremely valuable, often commanded by the very richest art-buyers, including princes who hung them in their palaces and even took them on their travels as prestigious displays of wealth, often with a visual message, especially the world-famous Flemish ateliers were deemed worthy to have cartons made by some of the greatest graphic artists of the time, including such celebrated painters as Rubens.

In the 1980s, milk cartons in the United States often printed photos of missing children with the hope that someone would recognize the photograph and provide information to police.

Many milk cartons also included advertisements and sponsors. These images and sponsors ranged from DVDs, Cereal, Cartoons, Frozen Dinners, and Albums.

== Carton-pierre ==
Carton-pierre was a material used for the making of raised ornaments for wall and ceiling decoration. It is composed of the pulp of paper mixed with whiting (ground calcium carbonate) and glue, this being forced into plaster moulds backed with paper, and then removed to a drying room to harden. It is much stronger and lighter than common plaster-of-Paris ornaments, and is not so liable to chip or break if struck with anything.

== Beverages & snacks found in cartons ==
There is a plethora of beverages and snacks found within carton-packaging. This includes milk, juices (in juice boxes), egg whites, coffee, protein shakes, water, and even snacks like Goldfish and Whoppers.

== See also ==
- Corrugated box
- Juice box
- Tetra Pak
- Elopak
