= Juice box =

Type of beverage packaging

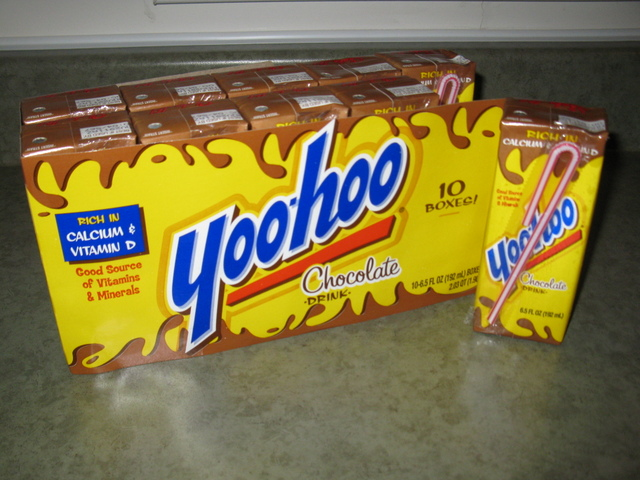
A 10-pack of boxes of Yoo-hoo chocolate drink, with drinking straws attached

A juice box, also called a carton (BrE) or popper (AuE), is a small carton used to conveniently carry and consume drinks. These containers are frequently made of paperboard with an aluminum foil lining, but variations exist. Juice boxes are most popular with children, although other uses include emergency drinking water, milk, and wine.

A juice box is considered an aseptic container, meaning it is manufactured and filled under aseptic processing and requires no refrigeration or preservatives to remain germ-free.

== History ==
Ruben Rausing first created a product in 1963 that consisted of a box that would be used for containing liquids, more specifically, milk. His creation was named the Tetra Brik, and gained popularity because the product was efficient and a major space saver compared to the canisters that were previously used. The juice box was officially incorporated into the U.S. market in 1980. After its introduction, the product gained almost instant popularity and the market began to grow at a fast rate. According to an article on the website E notes, in 1986, only six years after the product's introduction, juice boxes accounted for 20% of the United States juice market, as more and more companies were introducing their own lines of juice boxes.

In 1989, environmentalists raised concerns that the multi-layered design of juice boxes made them difficult to recycle or reuse.

== Packaging and marketing ==
A juice box is made of liquid packaging board which is usually six layers of paper, polyethylene, and aluminum foil. Paper is used to shape the product and give the box an extra source of strength, Polyethylene forms a liquid-tight seal and keeps the product dry, polyethylene is the layer used to print the information and graphics that are provided on the packaging, aluminum is used for the purpose of keeping light and oxygen out (as well preventing the juice from becoming spoiled without having to use extra preservatives).

One of the reasons why juice boxes are so popular is their convenience. Juice boxes are portable and can be easily drunk while on the go. The shape of the product makes it easy for kids and adults to hold and use.

Juice boxes were originally designed in a very specific fashion, a style that has proved to be successful as it has remained, for the most part, unchanged. Manufacturers chose a box shape because they foresaw this shape as being the most convenient and easily handled. Juice boxes typically come with a covered hole and an attached bendable drinking straw, making it easier for children to drink from and generally resulting in less of a mess, and the bending nature of the straw helps it not fall into the box. Some boxes are equipped with a pull tab; this variation of the juice box is more suited to larger portions that are not consumed in one sitting because the tab is resealable.

== See also ==
- Tetra Brik
