= Cardboard (disambiguation) =

Cardboard is a generic term for a heavy-duty paper.

Cardboard may also refer to:

== Materials ==
- Binder's board
- Card stock, heavy paper used for making cards
- Corrugated fiberboard, a combination of paperboards, usually two flat liners and one inner fluted corrugated medium, often used for making corrugated boxes
- Display board, Poster board
- Paperboard, a paper-based material often used for folding cartons, set-up boxes, carded packaging, etc.
  - Containerboard
  - Folding boxboard
  - Solid bleached board
  - Solid unbleached board
  - White lined chipboard

== Other uses ==
- Google Cardboard, a smartphone mount supporting virtual reality visualization
- The Cardboards, a Pittsburgh, Pennsylvania band of the 1970s and 1980s
- Cardboard record, a type of cheaply made phonograph record made of plastic-coated thin paperboard
- Cardboard, a graphic novel by Doug TenNapel
- Pycnanthus angolensis, a tree species

== See also ==
- Cardboard box
