= Cardboard =

Heavy-duty paper of varying strengths

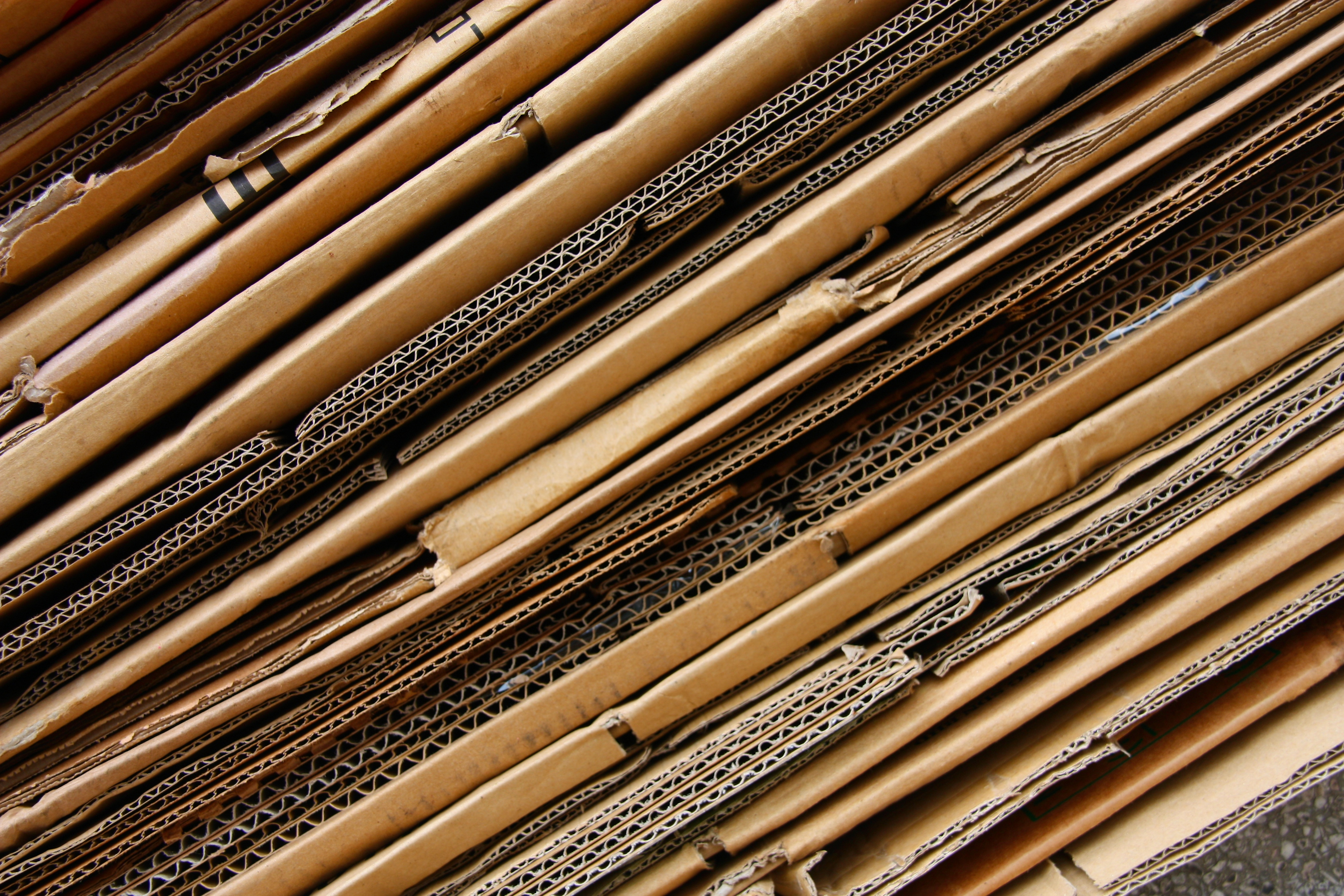
Folded cardboard boxes, viewed sideways

Cardboard is a generic term for heavy paper-based products ranging from a thick paper known as paperboard to corrugated fiberboard.

== Description ==
Cardboard is a generic term for heavy paper-based products whose construction can range from a thick paper known as paperboard to corrugated fiberboard, made of multiple plies of material. Natural cardboards can range from grey to light brown in color, depending on the specific product; dyes, pigments, printing, and coatings are available.

The word cardboard has general use in English and French, but the term is deprecated in commerce and industry as not adequately defining a specific product. Material producers, container manufacturers, packaging engineers, and standards organizations, use more specific terminology.

== Usage ==
In 2020, the United States hit a record high in its yearly use of cardboard. Over 120 billion pieces were used that year, with around 80 percent of all the products sold in the United States being packaged in cardboard. In the same year, over 13,000 separate pieces of consumer cardboard packaging were thrown away by American households, combined with all paper products, and this constitutes almost 42 percent of all solid waste generated by the United States annually. In an effort to reduce this environmental impact, many households have started repurposing cardboard boxes for eco-friendly purposes.

However, despite the sheer magnitude of paper waste, the vast majority of it is composed of sustainable packaging materials of modern times: corrugated cardboard, known industrially as corrugated fiberboard.

A sculpture made from layered corrugated cardboard and adhesive

Outside traditional recycling, many artists reuse cardboard as an affordable way to produce art. Pablo Picasso used cardboard to create his first cubist guitar, later remaking the sculpture in sheet metal. Other artists like Tom Sachs and Monami Ohno make their finished sculptures out of cardboard, making the material itself a highlight of the work.

== Types ==
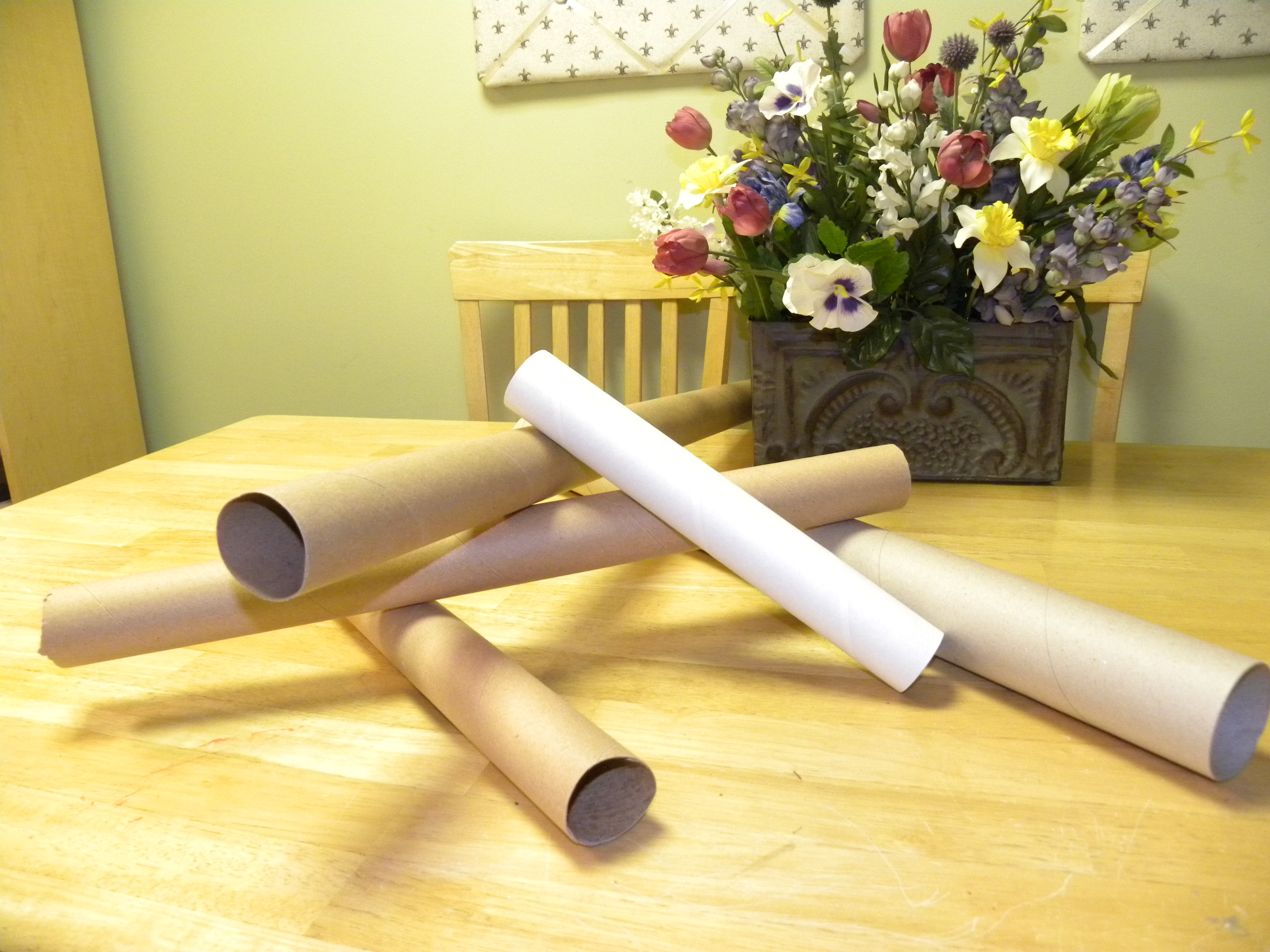
Tubes made of cardboard, which require high rigidity, but low printability

=== Various card stocks ===
Various types of cards are available, which may be called cardboard. Included are: thick paper (of various types) or pasteboard used for business cards, aperture cards, postcards, playing cards, catalog covers, binder's board for bookbinding, scrapbooking, and other uses which require higher durability than regular paper.

=== Paperboard ===
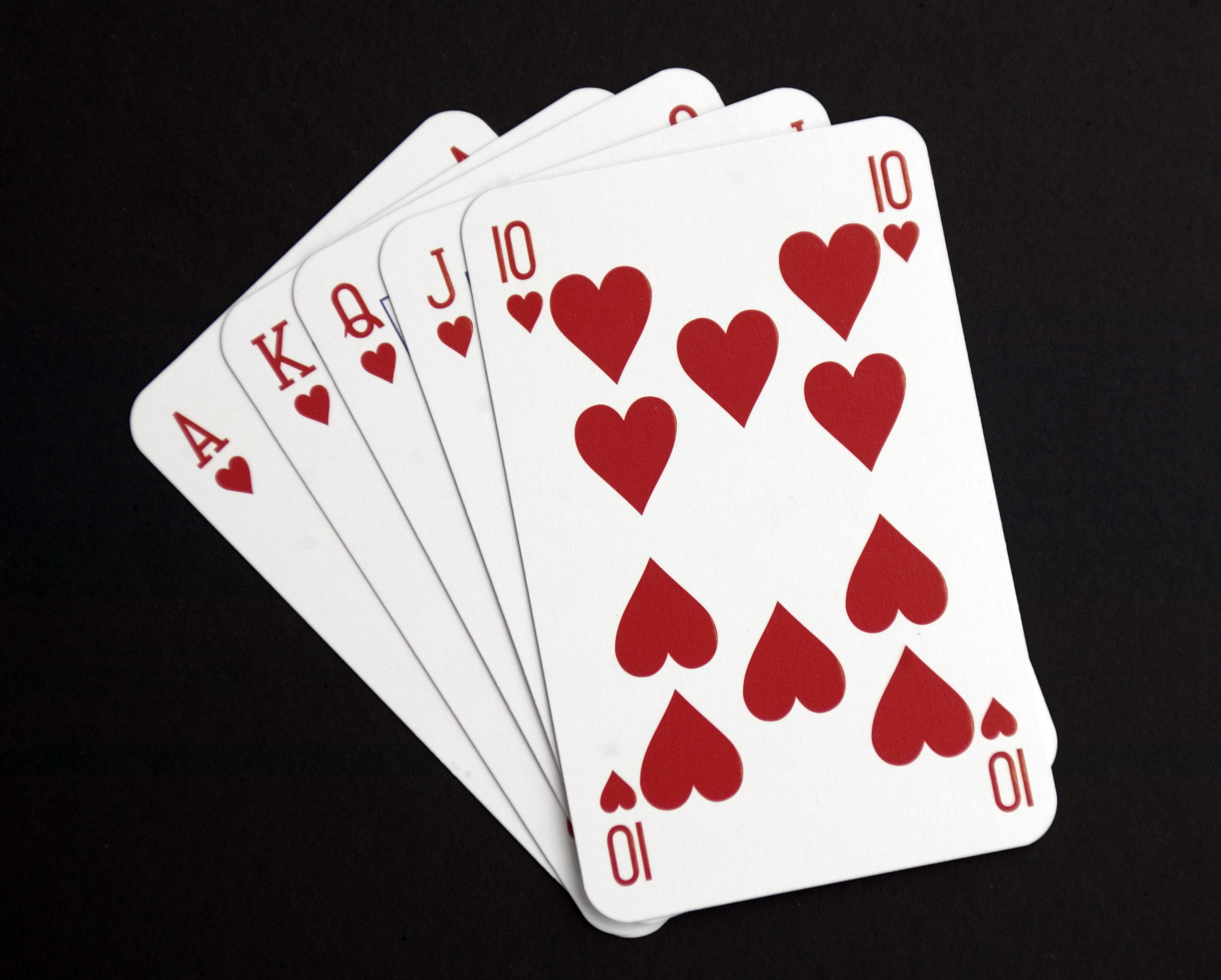
Playing cards, which require a very rigid single sheet with high surface durability and printability

Paperboard is a paper-based material, usually more than about ten mils (0.010 inches (0.25 mm)) thick. It is often used for folding cartons, set-up boxes, carded packaging, etc. Configurations of paperboard include:

- Containerboard, used in the production of corrugated fiberboard.
- Folding boxboard, comprising multiple layers of chemical and mechanical pulp.
- Solid bleached board, made purely from bleached chemical pulp and usually has a mineral or synthetic pigment.
- Solid unbleached board, typically made of unbleached chemical pulp.
- White lined chipboard, typically made from layers of waste paper or recycled fibers, most often with two to three layers of coating on the top and one layer on the reverse side. Because of its recycled content it will be grey from the inside.
- Binder's board, a paperboard used in bookbinding for making hardcovers.

Currently, materials falling under these names may be made without using any actual paper.

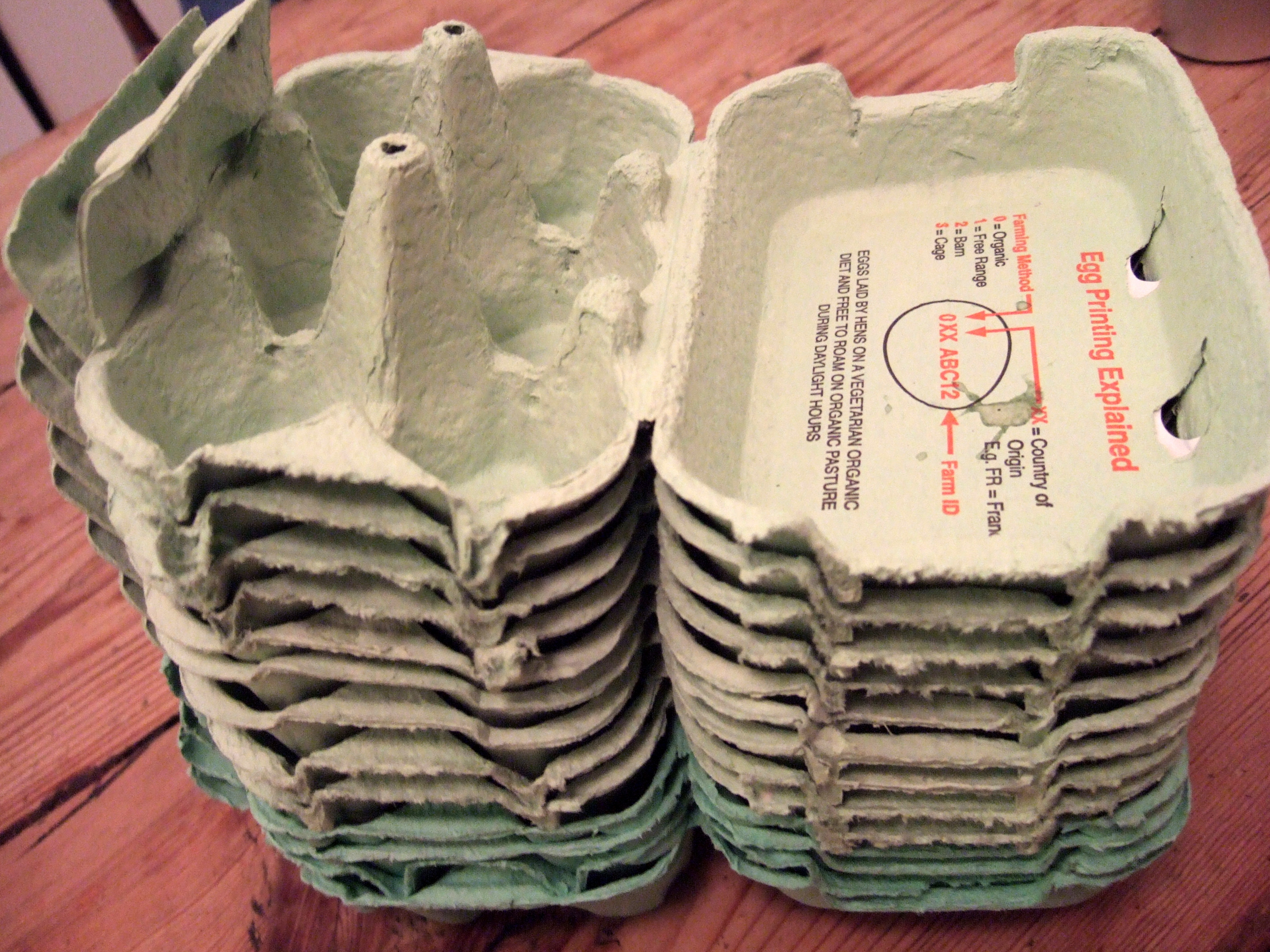
Egg cartons

=== Corrugated fiberboard ===
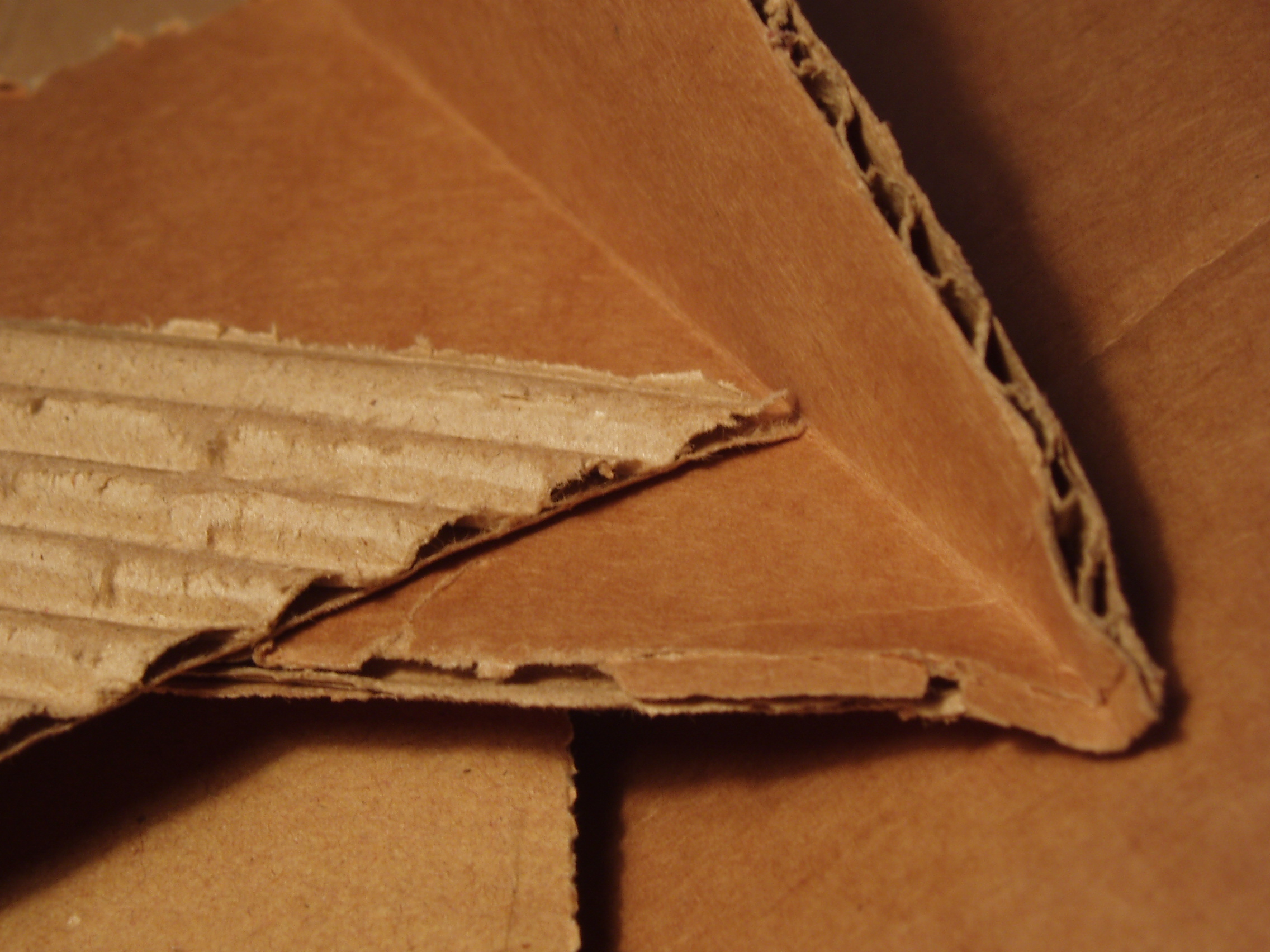
Corrugated fiberboard

Corrugated fiberboard is a combination of paperboards, usually two flat liners and one inner fluted corrugated medium. It is often used for making corrugated boxes for shipping or storing products. This type of cardboard is also used by artists as original material for sculpting.

== Recycling ==
Most types of cardboard are recyclable. Boards that are laminates, wax coated, or treated for wet-strength are often more difficult to recycle. Clean cardboard (i.e., cardboard that has not been subject to chemical coatings) "is usually worth recovering, although often the difference between the value it realizes and the cost of recovery is marginal". Cardboard can be recycled for industrial or domestic use. For example, cardboard may be composted or shredded for animal bedding.

== History ==
The term cardboard has been used since at least 1848, when Anne Brontë mentioned it in her novel The Tenant of Wildfell Hall. The Kellogg brothers first used paperboard cartons to hold their flaked corn cereal, and later, when they began marketing it to the general public, a heat-sealed bag of wax paper was wrapped around the outside of the box and printed with their brand name. This development marked the origin of the cereal box, though in modern times the sealed bag is plastic and is kept inside the box. The Kieckhefer Container Company, run by John W. Kieckhefer, was another early American packaging industry pioneer. It excelled in the use of fiber shipping containers, particularly the paper milk carton.

== Examples of different end use ==
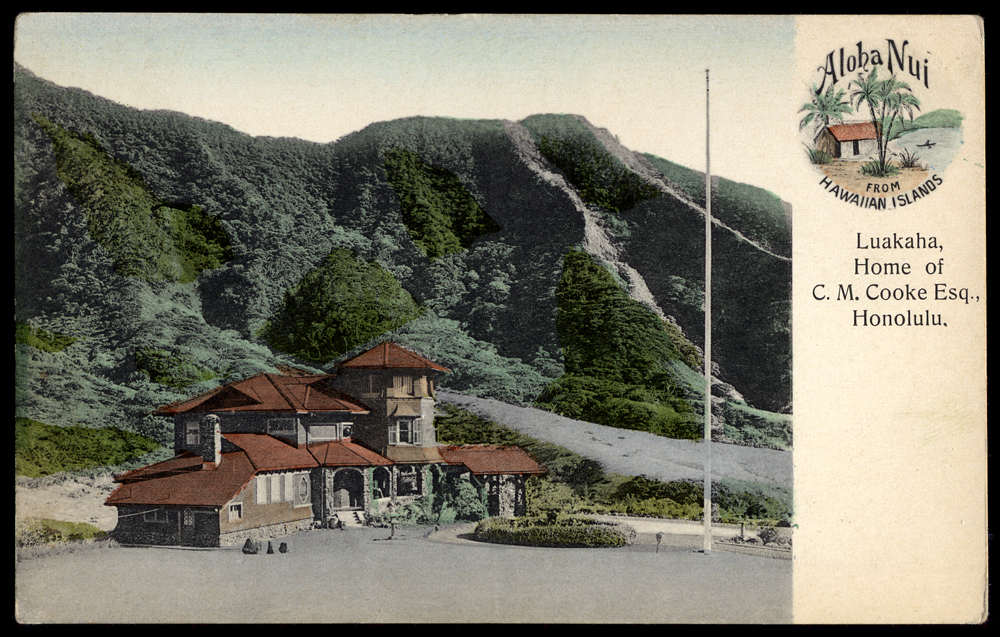
A postcard from 1908

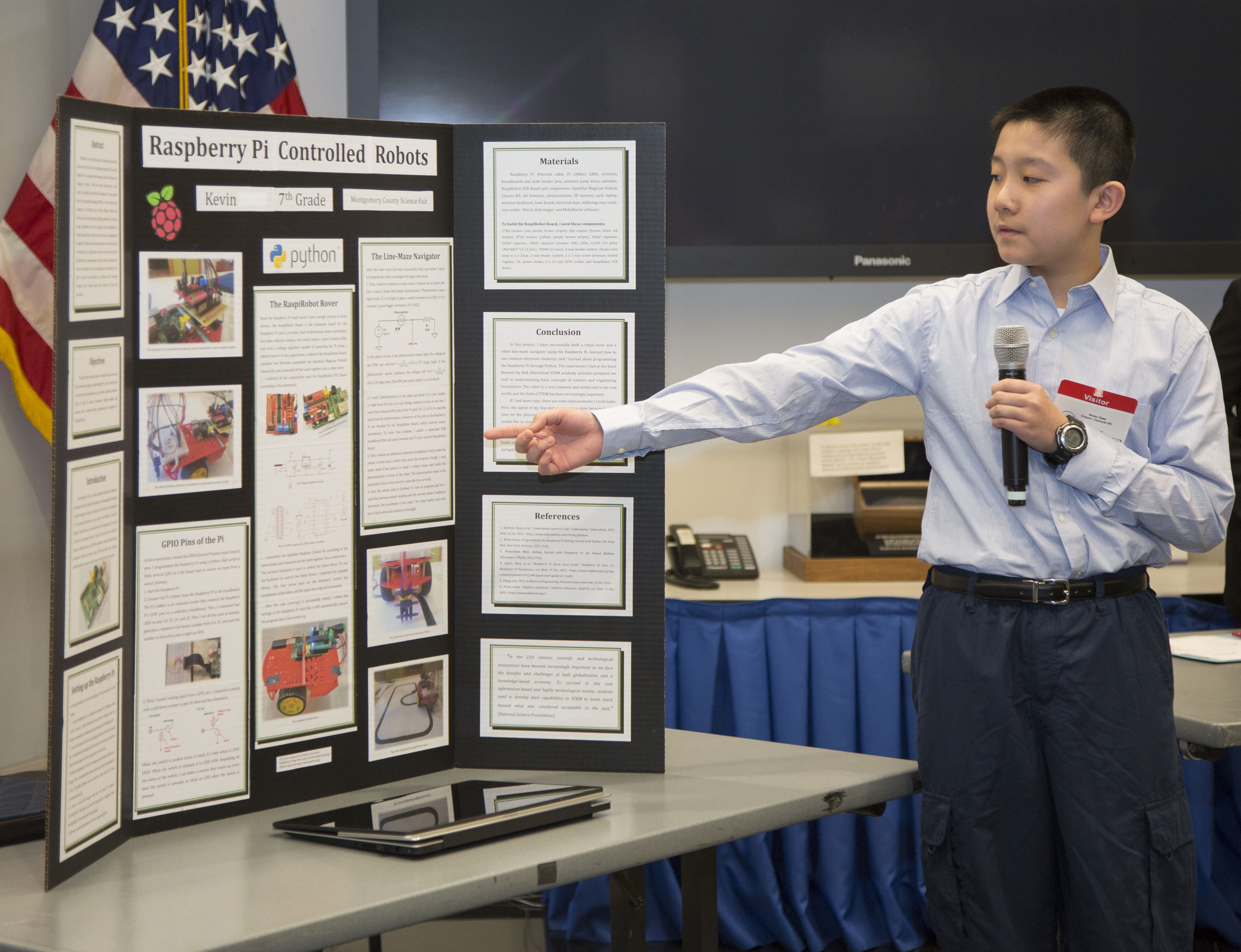
Posters and display boards at science fair

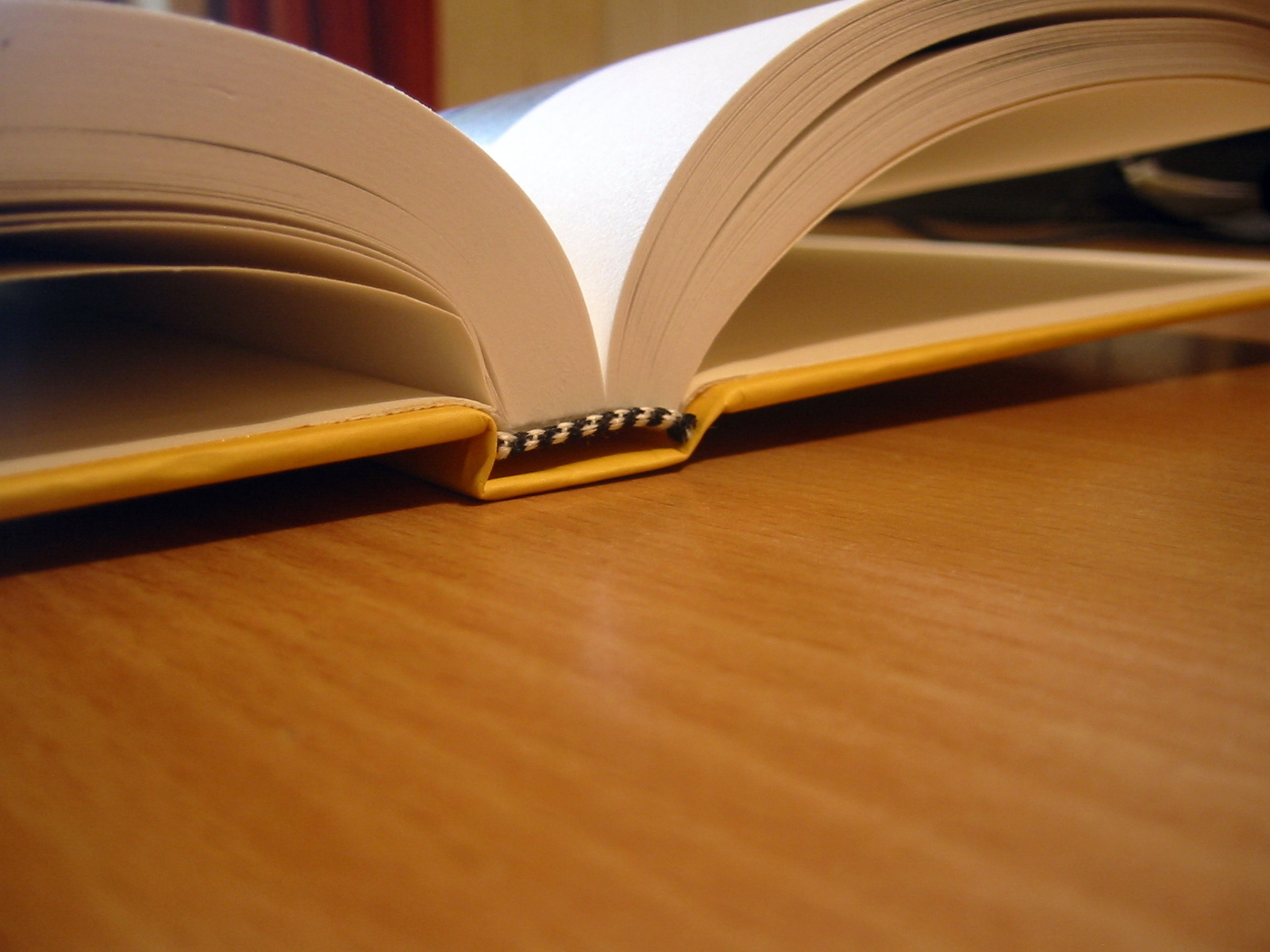
Hardcover book

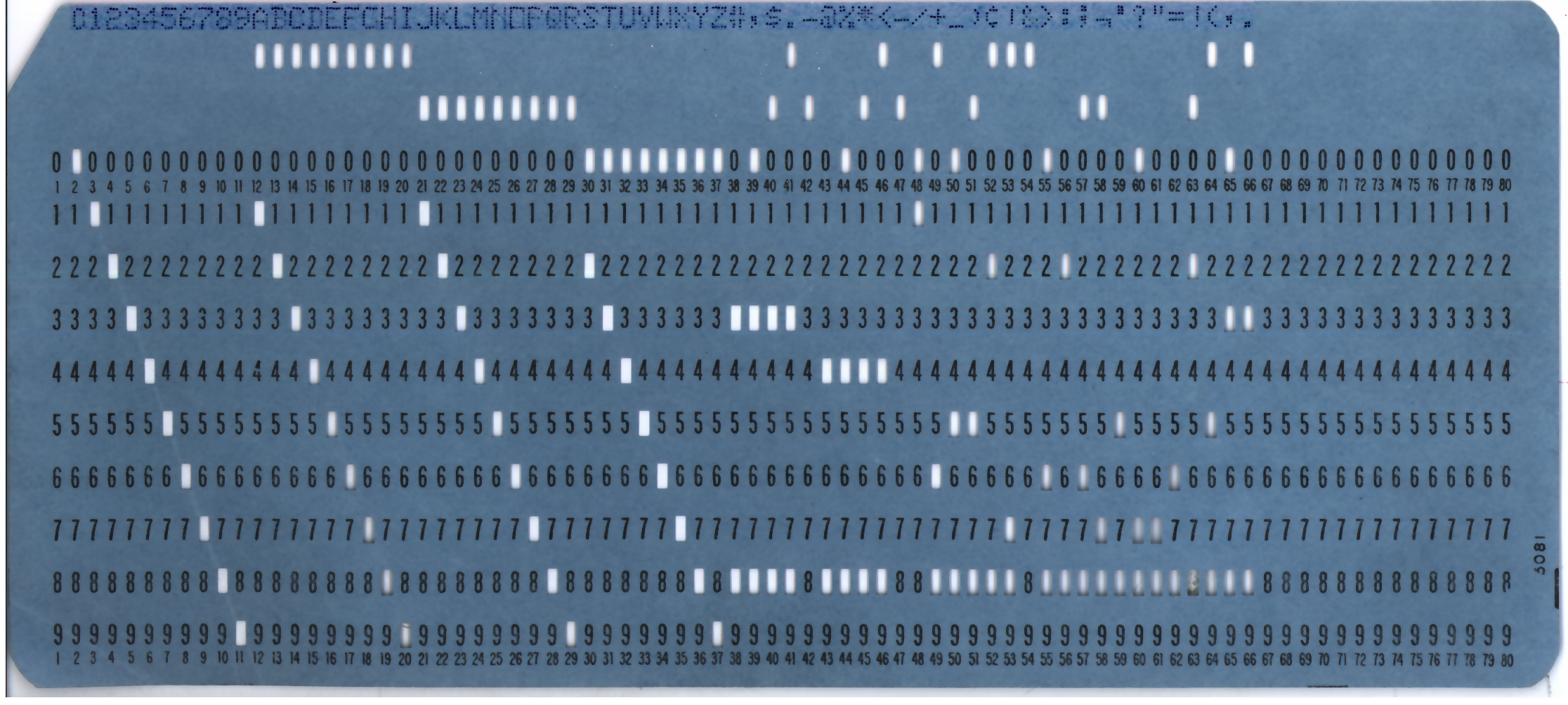
Punch card, early digital storage

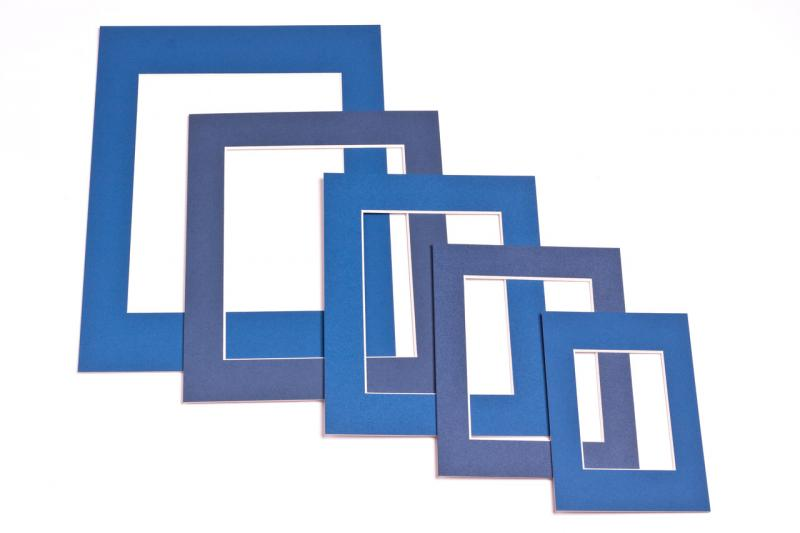
Mats used for framing pictures

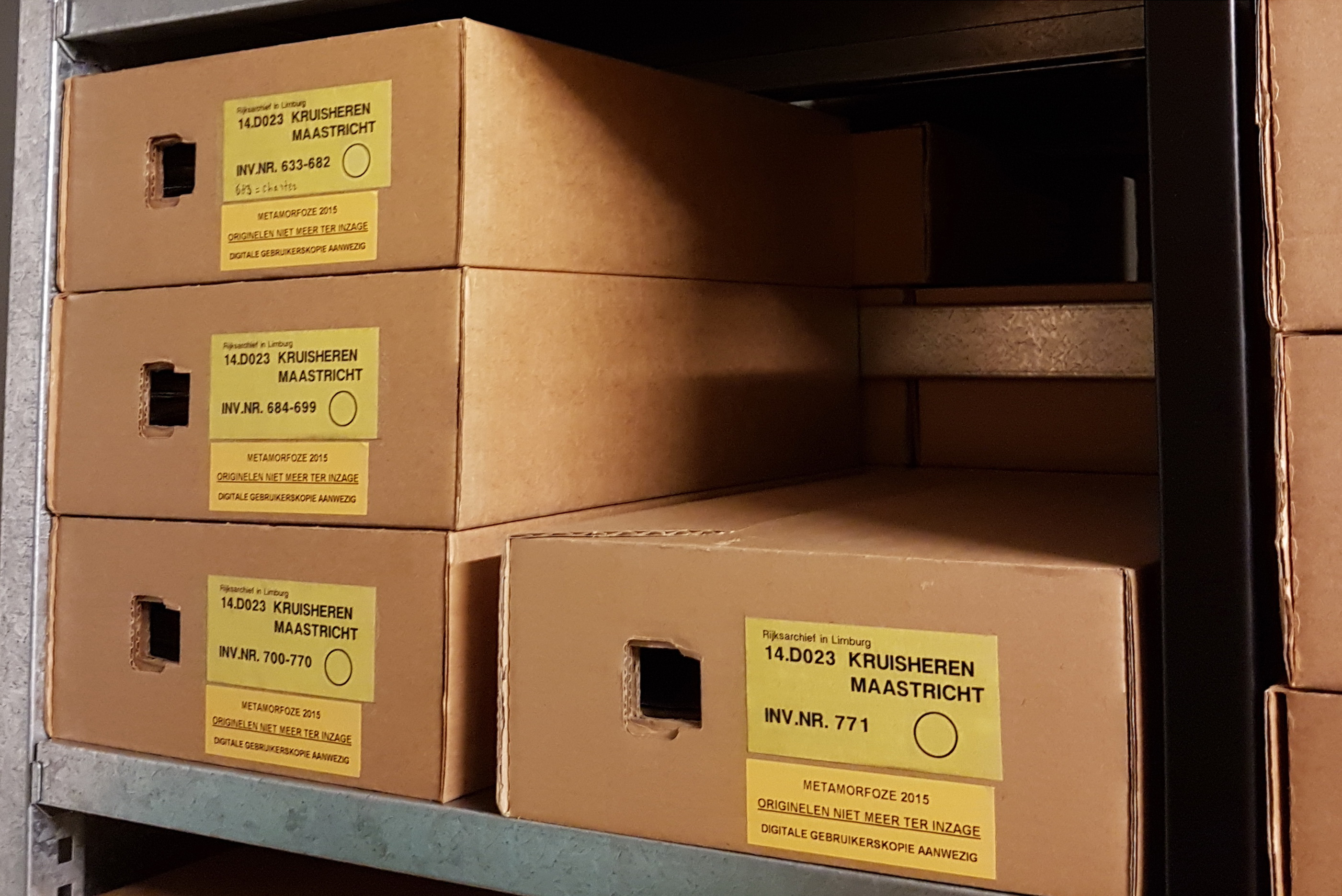
Corrugated box used for storage of archives

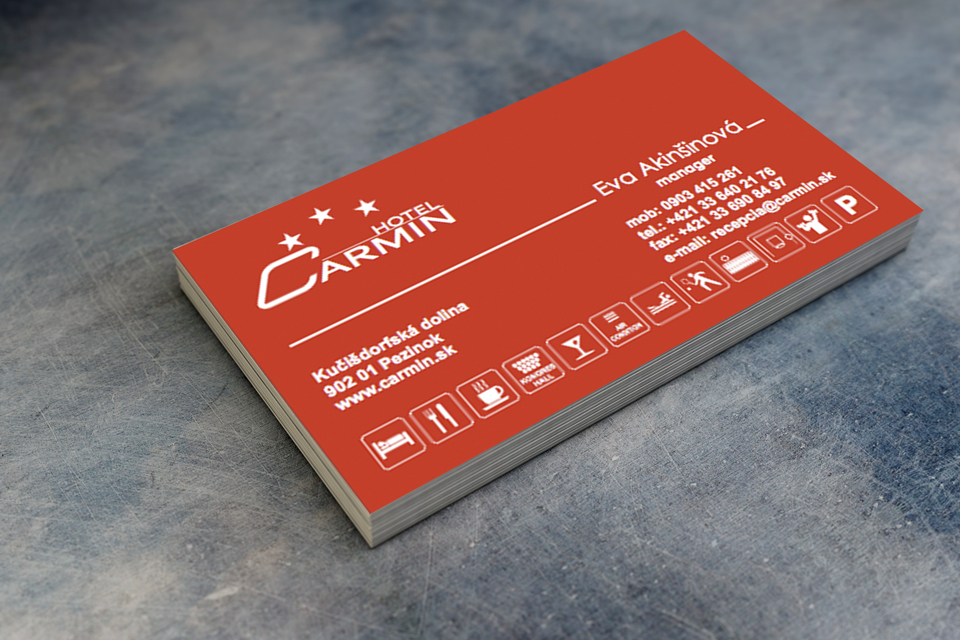
Business cards

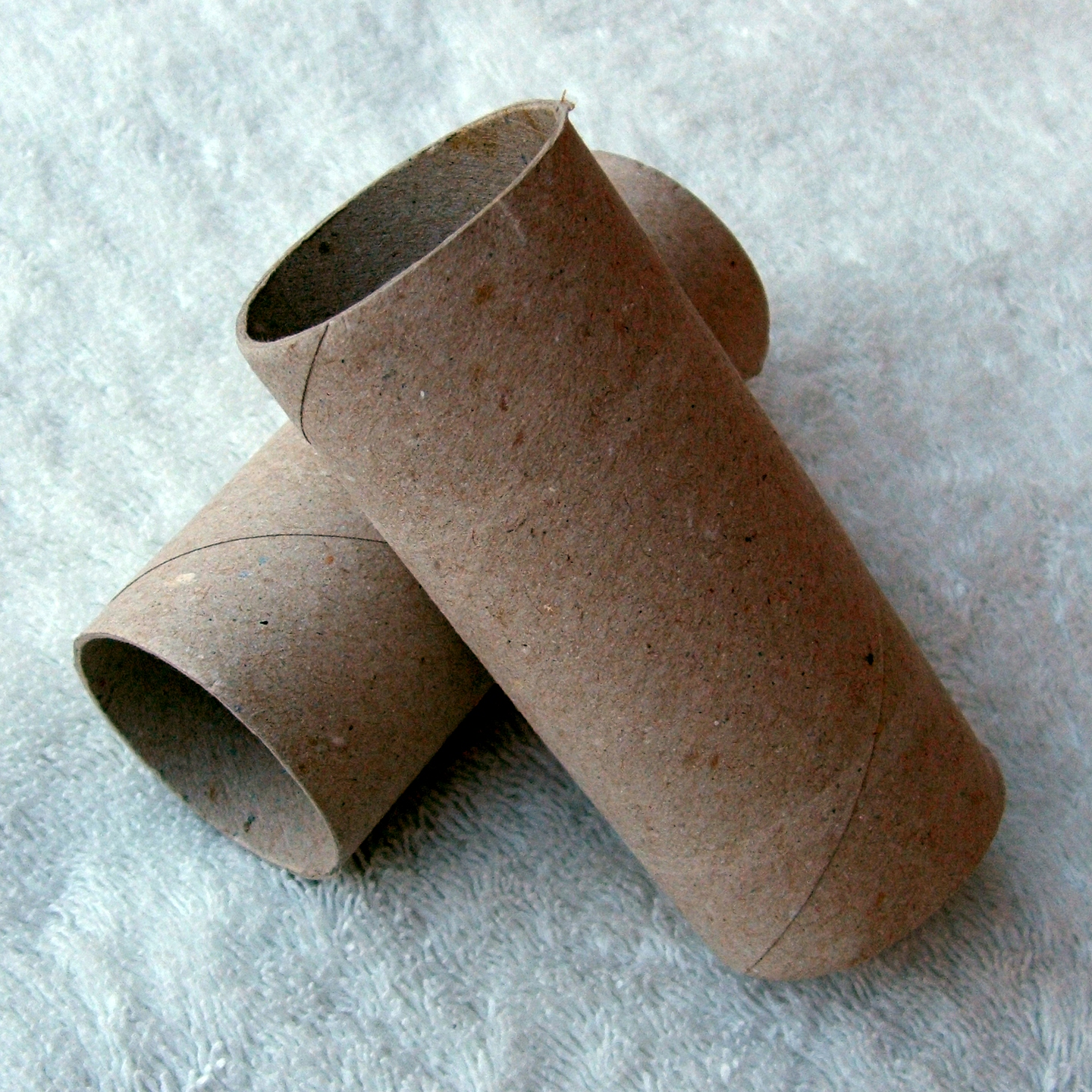
Fiber tubes for roll of paper

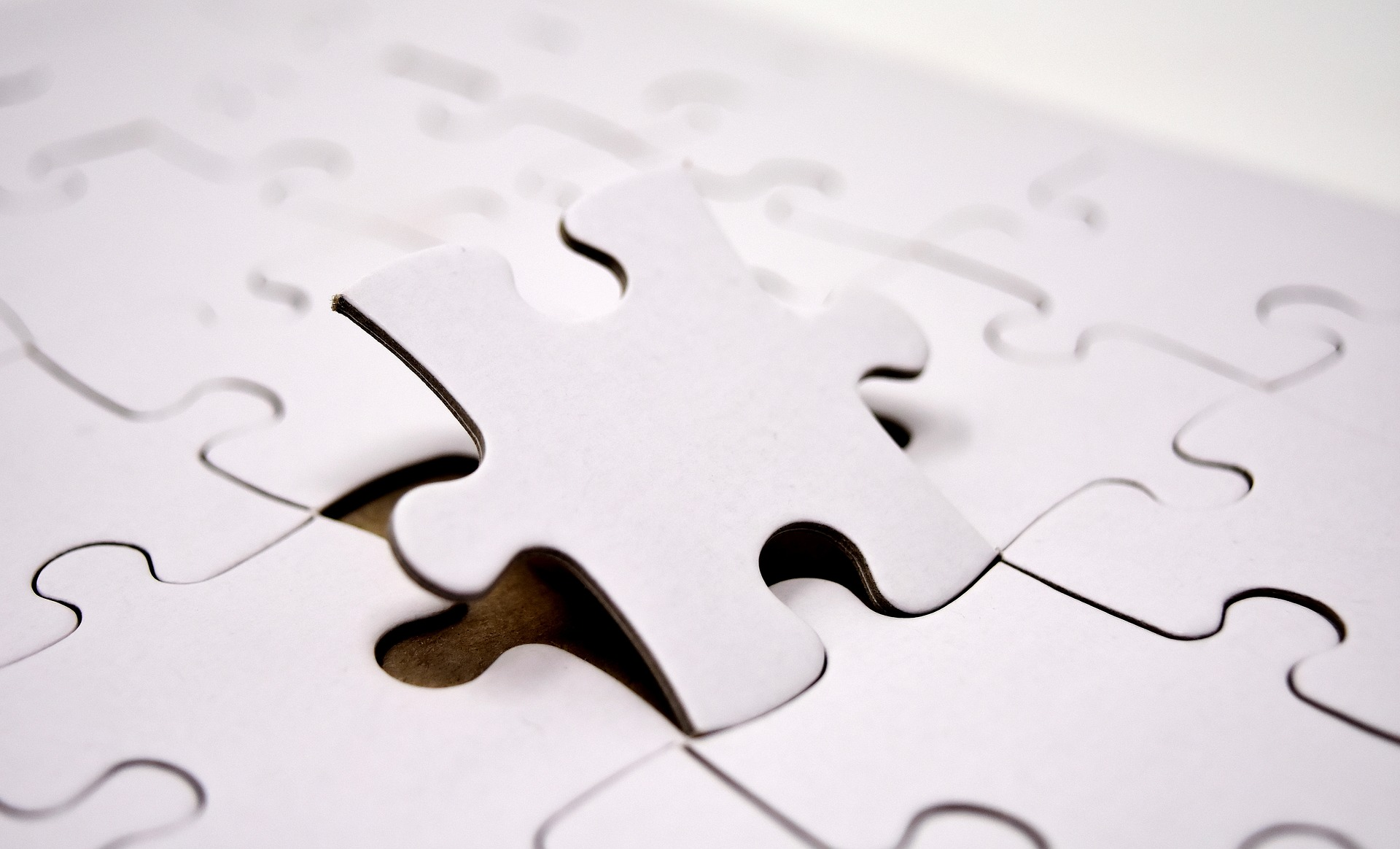
Paperboard jigsaw puzzle

== See also ==
- Cardboard box
- Cardboard furniture
- Carton
- Corrugated box design
- Folding carton
- Juicebox (container)
- Paperboard
