= Holmen Iggesund =

Swedish paperboard company

Coordinates: 61°38′47.81″N 17°4′46.63″E

- Company type: Aktiebolag
- Industry: Pulp and paper industry
- Founded: 1685 Iggesunds Bruk, 1949 Iggesund IPO
- Headquarters: Iggesund, Sweden
- Key people: Henrik Sjölund (President and CEO of Holmen Group); Lars Lundin (Head of Holmen Iggesund)
- Products: Paperboard: Invercote, Incada and Inverform
- Revenue: SEK 5 252 million (2016)
- Net income: ▲SEK 903 million (2016)
- Owner: Holmen Group(100%)
- Number of employees: 1,406 (2016)
- Website: www.iggesund.com

Holmen Board and Paper's mill in Iggesund is a premium paperboard production mill and part of the Holmen Group. Holmen is one of the largest forest owners in Sweden which bases its business in the forest industry and the pulp and paper industry. Holmen's main products are paperboard for consumer packaging and graphical applications, printing paper for magazines, direct mail, books and newspapers.

== History ==
Iggesund is an industrial village in Sweden. Isak Breant Sr, a businessman and former court commissioner to Queen Kristina, established there a mill in 1685. Iggesunds Bruk (English:mill) was originally an ironworks, and the nearby forests were used to produce charcoal for the factory. In 1771, Iggesund Bruk acquired a small nearby company that made paper, Östanå paper mill. It was one of the first to try to use sawdust and wood to produce paper. However, the technique remained experimental. The mill burnt down in 1842. In 1869, Baron Gustav Tamm became the owner of Iggesunds Bruk, and built a large sawmill. It was a major transformation for the factory, which had always been an ironworks. Iggesund's shares were first listed on Stockholmsbörsen in 1949. Lars G. Sundblad introduced paperboard manufacturing at Iggesund, which started in 1963. The merger of MoDo, Holmen and Iggesund resulted in the delisting of Iggesund shares from Stockholmsbörsen (1988), making Iggesund part of the holding, which was renamed to Holmen AB in 2000

== Products ==
The mill in Iggesund produces two products:

- Invercote, a solid bleached board (SBB, GZ) with a grammage of 200–400 g/m^{2} and a thickness of 200-485 μm
- Inverform, a solid bleached board (SBB, GZ) with a natural feel that has been specifically designed for ready-made meal packaging such as pressed and deep-drawn trays. It can also be used to make cutlery and more.

== Mills ==
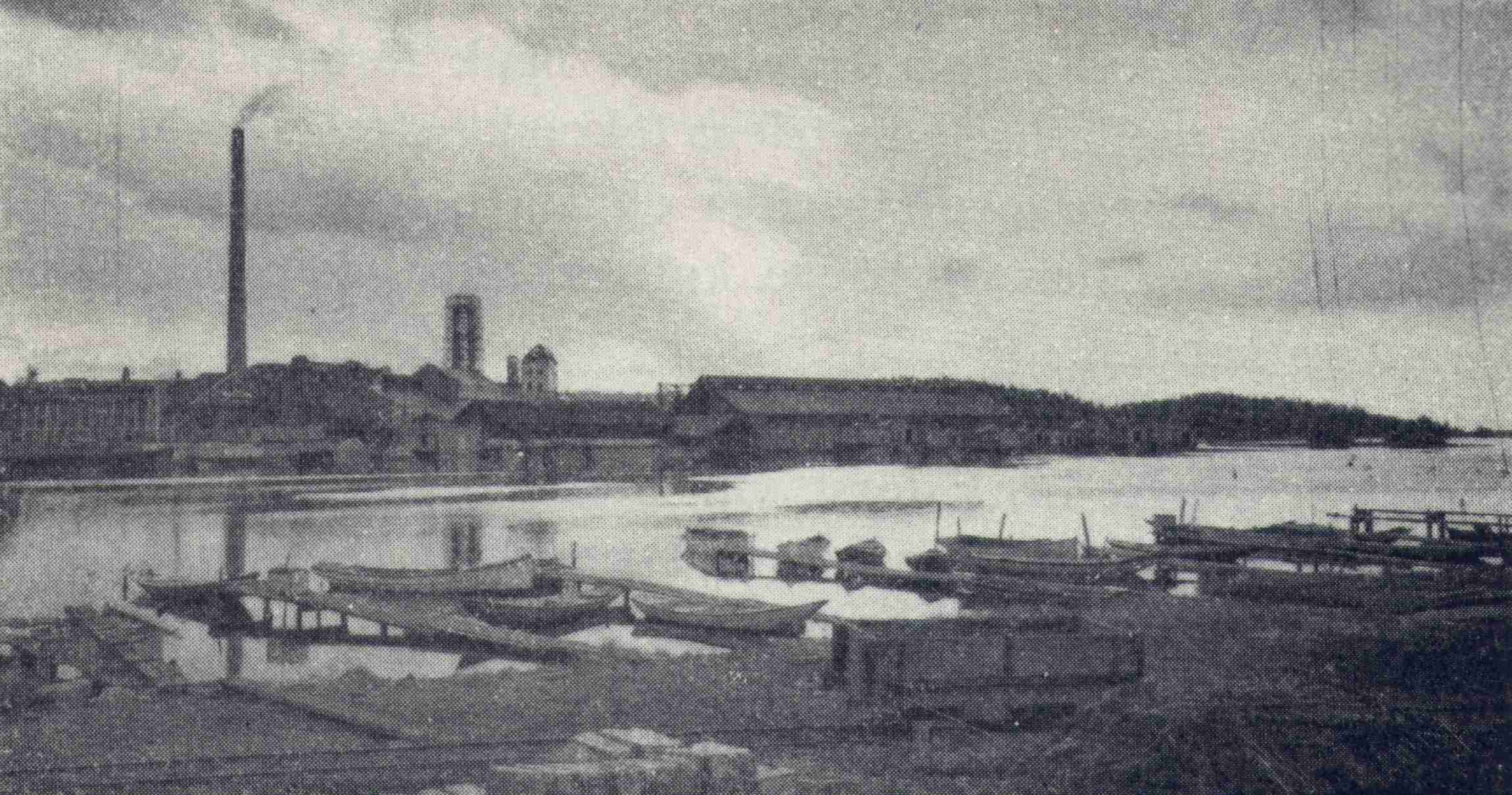
Iggesunds bruk (1923)

Iggesunds Bruk manufactures solid bleached board (SBB, GZ) for the Invercote range in Iggesund, Sweden.

- two machines with an annual capacity of about 330,000 tons
- certified in accordance with ISO 9001 and ISO 14001.
- FSC (Forest Stewardship Council) certified
- PEFC (Programme for the Endorsement of Forest Certification ) certified

Ströms Bruk produces plastic-coated and laminated paperboard on the basis of paperboard from Iggesund and Workington at a capacity of 40,000 tons/year in Strömsbruk, Sweden

== Locations ==
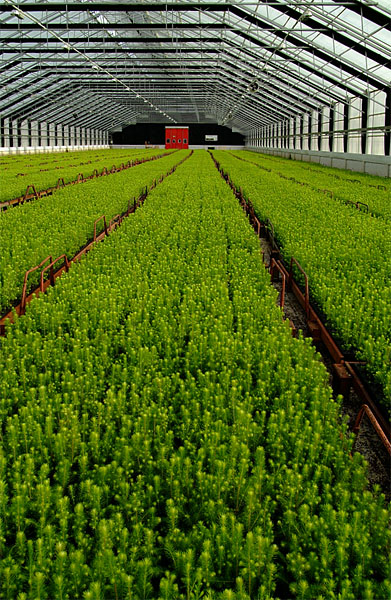
Holmen's nursery, close to Friggesund

Head Office:

- Holmen Board and Paper, Norrköping, Sweden

Sales offices:

- Amsterdam, Netherlands
- Hong Kong
- Singapore
- Lyndhurst, United States

Sales agents:

- Worldwide

Distribution terminals:

- Iggesund, Sweden
- (Republic of Ireland) Jenkins, Ireland
- Kraków, Poland
- Kiel, Germany
- Rotterdam, Netherlands
- Tilbury, United Kingdom
- Workington, United Kingdom

== See also ==
- TAPPI.org Technical Association of the Pulp and Paper Industry
- FSC.org Forest Stewardship Council
- PEFC.se Programme for the Endorsement of Forest Certification
