= Chipboard =

Chipboard may refer to:

- Particle board, a type of engineered wood known as chipboard in some countries
- Paperboard, a thick paper-based material

== See also ==
- White-lined chipboard, a grade of paperboard
- Oriented strand board, sometimes confused with chipboard
