= Clearwater Paper =

American pulp and paperboard manufacturer

Clearwater Paper Corporation
- Type: Public
- Traded as: NYSE: CLW
- Industry: Pulp and paper
- Founded: 2008
- Headquarters: Spokane, Washington, U.S.
- Key people: Arsen Kitch (CEO)
- Products: Pulp, paperboard
- Revenue: $2 billion in sales
- Website: www.clearwaterpaper.com

Clearwater Paper Corporation is an American pulp and paperboard manufacturer. The company was created on December 9, 2008, via a spin-off from Potlatch Corporation and is headquartered in Spokane, Washington.

In 2024, Clearwater Paper sold its private label tissue consumer products division to focus on being a premier independent supplier of paperboard packaging products to North American converters.

Following the tissue divestiture, the company operates three solid bleached sulfate mills in Lewiston, Idaho, Arkansas City, Arkansas, and Augusta, Georgia, as well as smaller converting facilities owned by Clearwater subsidiary Manchester Industries.

== Clearwater Timber Company ==
The Clearwater Timber Company was founded in December 1900 by Frederick Weyerhaeuser and John A. Humbird, who initially logged over 40,000 acres on the Clearwater River in Idaho.

Clearwater Timber land holdings grew to over 236,000 acres by 1927 when the company started up a sawmill on the Clearwater River in Lewiston, Idaho.

Economic conditions worsened during the Great Depression and the Clearwater Timber Company was acquired by Potlatch Forests Inc. in 1931.

== Potlatch ==
Potlatch Forests Inc. grew its footprint nationally following World War II and expanded into manufacturing of pulp and paperboard with the startup of a mill at Lewiston in 1950. A second mill started up in Arkansas City, Arkansas in 1977.

Potlatch also entered tissue manufacturing in 1953 by buying a mill in Pomona, California. In 1963, Potlatch began manufacturing private label tissue products at its Lewiston mill. Potlatch started up a tissue plant in North Las Vegas, Nevada in 1993 and expanded to the Midwest in 2000 with a converting line in Benton Harbor, Michigan. Potlatch consolidated its Midwest tissue converting operations in Elwood, Illinois in 2006.

== Spin-off from Potlatch ==
The spin-off from Potlatch Corporation was announced by its board of directors July 17, 2008, with the official date for the creation of Clearwater Paper being December 9, 2008. Potlatch Corporation would become a real estate investment trust (REIT) while Clearwater Paper retained Potlatch tissue and paperboard manufacturing facilities.

According to the IRS, the spin-off was ruled to be a tax-free distribution of stock as Potlatch issued 1 share of Clearwater Paper stock for every 3.5 shares of Potlatch stock, with fractional shares paid in cash. Clearwater Paper stock began to be publicly listed on December 17, 2008.

== Manufacturing divisions ==
From 2008 to 2024, Clearwater Paper was composed of two separate divisions—consumer products and pulp and paperboard.

=== Consumer products ===
The consumer products division manufactured and sold household tissue paper, including paper towels, napkins, bathroom tissue and facial tissue.

The division produced through-air-dried (TAD) paper towels, as well as premium and value brand towels. It made napkins in ultra, two-ply and three-ply dinner napkins, plus value one-ply luncheon napkins. The bathroom tissue produced was mostly two-ply ultra, though other types were manufactured and sold. The facial tissues produced included ultra lotion facial tissues.

As of 2024, Clearwater Paper was the largest supplier of private label toilet paper to grocery chains in the United States.

Clearwater Paper sold its consumer products division to Sofidel Group in 2024 for $1.06 billion.

=== Pulp and paperboard ===
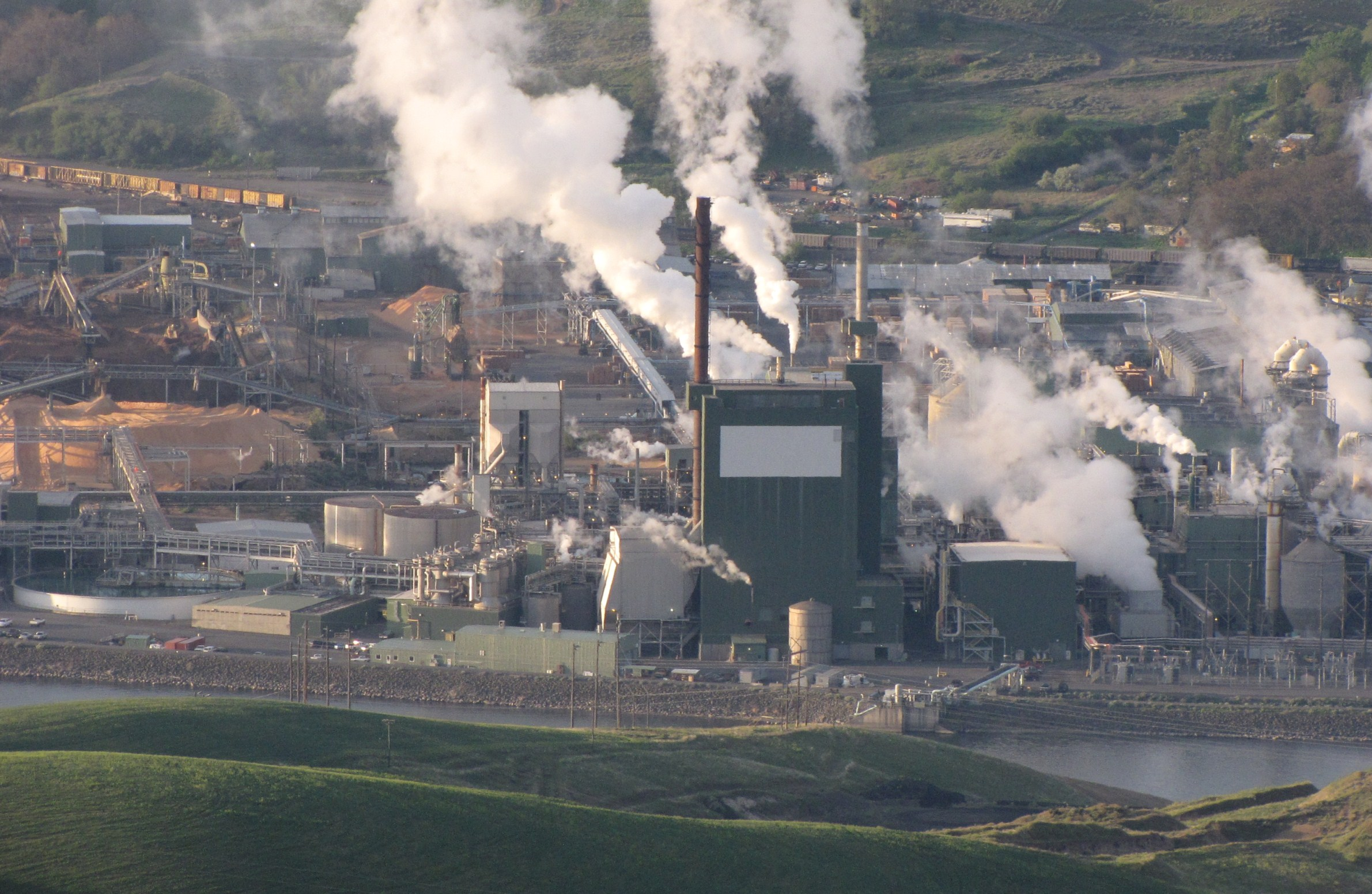
Clearwater Paper's large wood pulp mill, Lewiston, 2010

The company's pulp and paperboard segment manufactures bleached paperboard, primarily for the packaging industry. Solid bleached sulfate board is a type of paperboard that is used in the production of folding cartons, liquid packaging, plates, cups and in some commercial printing applications.

The pulp and paperboard segment also produces softwood market pulp, which is used as the primary raw material in the production of a wide variety of paper products, and slush pulp, which is sent to the Sofidel tissue manufacturing plant in Lewiston.

== Facilities ==
=== Consumer products ===
In 2008, Clearwater Paper had three manufacturing and converting facilities in Lewiston, Idaho, North Las Vegas, Nevada, and Elwood, Illinois. The company's facility at Shelby, North Carolina, officially started up in December 2012, producing its first private label through-air-dried (TAD) finished roll and converted tissue paper product to compete with national TAD tissue brands. In the same year, Clearwater Paper also completed upgrades to its North Las Vegas facility, allowing the facility to produce TAD ultra-bathroom tissue and household towels.

In late 2010, the company acquired Cellu Tissue Holdings, Inc., headquartered in Alpharetta, Georgia, which increased its tissue manufacturing presence in the eastern United States and Canada. With the acquisition of Cellu Tissue Holdings, Inc., Clearwater Paper added consumer products facilities at: East Hartford, Connecticut; Ladysmith, Wisconsin; Neenah, Wisconsin; Menominee, Michigan; Central Islip, New York; Natural Dam, New York; Oklahoma City, Oklahoma; Thomaston, Georgia; Wiggins, Mississippi; and St. Catharines, Ontario, Canada.

From 2013 to 2021, Clearwater Paper closed or divested former Cellu Tissue facilities:

- In 2013, Clearwater Paper announced the closing of its Thomaston, Georgia, facility
- In 2014, Clearwater Paper announced the closing of its Central Islip, New York, facility
- In 2014, Clearwater Paper sold five facilities to Dunn Paper (East Hartford, Connecticut; Menominee, Michigan; Natural Dam, New York; Wiggins, Mississippi; and St. Catharines, Ontario)
- In 2017, Clearwater Paper announced the closing of its Oklahoma City facility
- In 2018, Clearwater Paper sold its Ladysmith, Wisconsin, facility to Dunn Paper
- In 2021, Clearwater Paper announced the closing of its Neenah, Wisconsin facility

Clearwater Paper sold its four consumer products facilities in Lewiston, Idaho, North Las Vegas, Nevada, Elwood, Illinois, and Shelby, North Carolina, to Sofidel Group in 2024.

=== Pulp and paperboard ===
In 2008, Clearwater Paper operated two pulp and paperboard mills in Lewiston, Idaho, and Arkansas City, Arkansas.

In November 2011, Clearwater Paper divested the sawmill in Lewiston, Idaho, to Idaho Forest Group of Coeur d'Alene, Idaho.

In 2016, Clearwater Paper acquired Manchester Industries, a paperboard sales, sheeting and distribution supplier to the packaging and commercial print industries, headquartered in Richmond, Virginia.

In 2024, Clearwater Paper acquired the Augusta, Georgia solid bleached sulfate paperboard mill from Graphic Packaging.

== Environmental policies ==
Clearwater Paper's manufacturing locations adhere to the chain of custody standards set by the Forest Stewardship Council (FSC), the Sustainable Forestry Initiative (SFI), and the Programme for the Endorsement of Forest Certification.

Clearwater Paper's products include Candesce, which is sold for use in premium lines of coated folding carton as well in commercial printing, carded packaging, and liquid packaging applications. Clearwater's Ancora is a high-end coated, double-side bleached white paperboard. Clearwater Paper was the first North American solid bleached sulfate manufacturer to offer FSC certification across its product lines.

Clearwater Paper also produces NuVo, a paper cup product with up to 35% post-consumer fiber content, and ReMagine, a folding carton and blister pack product available in grades with 10% or 30% post-consumber fiber content.
