= British Paper and Board Industry Research Association =

Paper and board research organisation in the UK

- Formation: 1945; 81 years ago
- Location: Kenley, Surrey
- Region served: Worldwide

The British Paper and Board Industry Research Association (BPBIRA) was a collaborative research organisation focused on technological advancements within paper and cardboard manufacturing sector.

== History ==
Amongst other areas of research undertaken, the Association performed examinations into the chemistry and structure of the principal paper fibres (which included the analysis naturally occurring non-wood fibres such as cotton and linen), practical exploration of beating treatments (from its effects on fibres to means of measurement and process control), and changes of paper properties. By the mid 1960s, the Association was actively promoting the use of computers across the sector.

In 1962, the Association's director was Dr Norman R. Hood. On 29 June 1967, BPBIRA merged with the Printing and Allied Trades Research Association (PATRA); the resulting organisation was the Printing, Packaging & Allied Trades Research (PIRA) and consisted of three main divisions: Paper and Board, Printing, and Packaging.
