= Cardboard furniture =

Furniture made from corrugated fibreboard

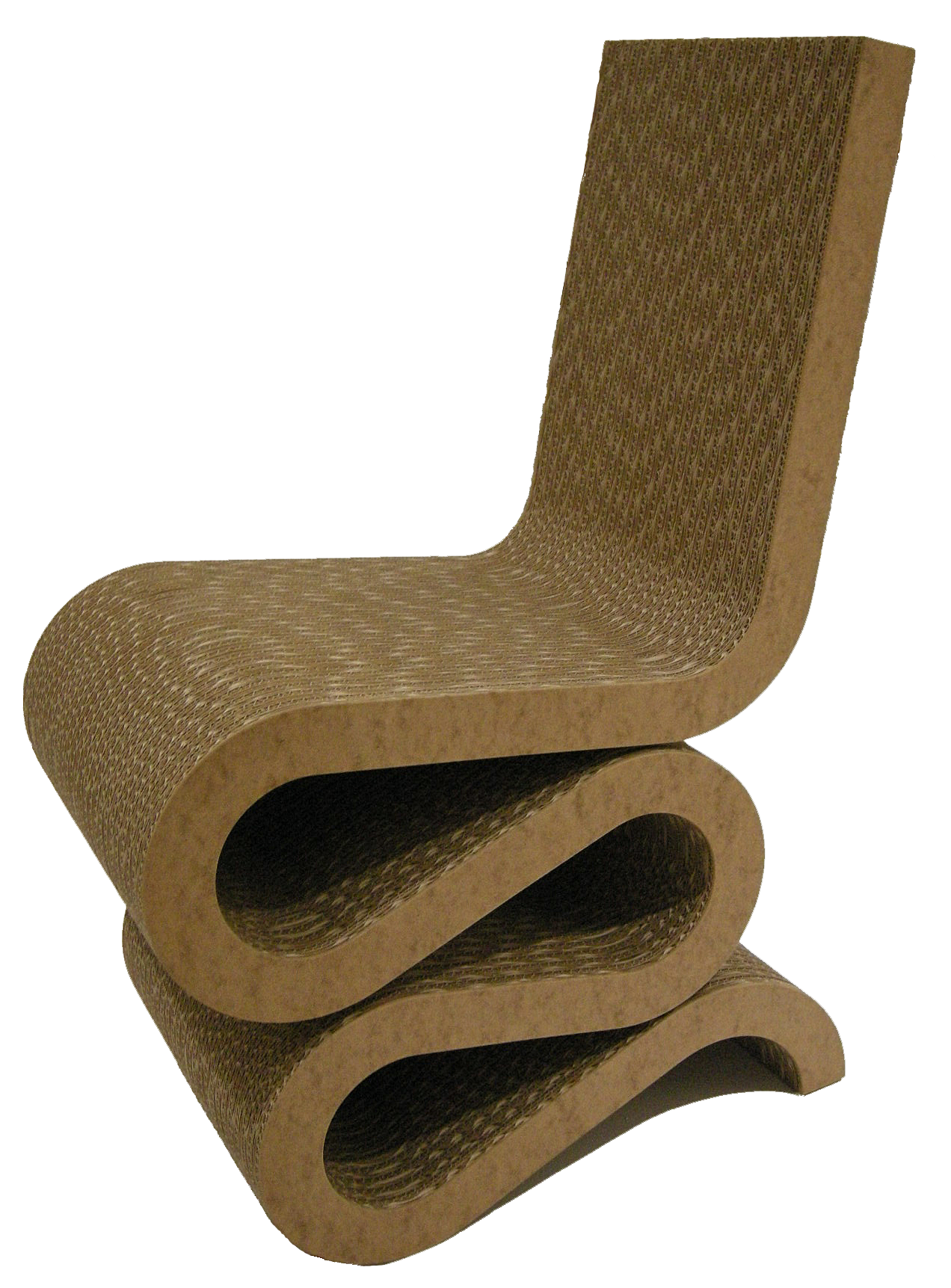
Wiggle Side Chair, Frank Gehry, 1972

Cardboard furniture is classified as furniture designed and made from corrugated fibreboard (including inverted corrugated boards), heavy paperboard, honeycomb board, fibre tubes or a combination of these materials. Cardboard furniture is misleading, since "cardboard" is a depreciated term, sometimes describing corrugated cardboard, but sometimes to any heavy paper. but not being sufficiently specific to describe the various forms of paper-based boards used today in order to make furniture.

Generally cardboard furniture is lightweight and easy to assemble, without using screws or glue.

== History and development ==
First usage of cardboard as a material for engineered lightweight structures occurred at the 1954 Triennale in Milan with Richard Buckminster Fuller displaying a Geodesic Dome made of cardboard. In 1968, German designer Peter Raacke demonstrated the possibilities of creating a cardboard chair within five minutes live on NBC, calling it the "first really modern piece of furniture".

In 1972, Canadian-born architect Frank Gehry (b. 1929) introduced the first publicly well-received cardboard furniture series ("Easy Edges"), including the iconic Wiggle Chair. Being confronted with some resistance at the time - i.g. New York Times calling it "paper furniture for penny pinchers" - and simultaneously worrying the furniture's popularity would be paramount to his work as an architect, Gehry stopped production in 1973 and quit cardboard furniture altogether by 1982, eventually giving the rights to Vitra, where the Wiggle Chair still is manufactured to this day.

In the 1990s, Japanese architect Shigeru Ban, recognized for his architecture using paper tubes, created furniture pieces which later resulted in his "Carta Collection" in 2016. Between 2001 and 2002, IKEA started to replace the core of selected designs with cardboard in order to reduce costs for the consumer and contribute to sustainability. In 2010, British designer Giles Miller created a pop-up store for Stella McCartney in Paris, using cardboard furniture. For the 2020 Tokyo Olympics cardboard beds were used in the athlete's accommodations, creating a media discussion whether or not these beds were made to prevent the athletes from having sexual intercourse.

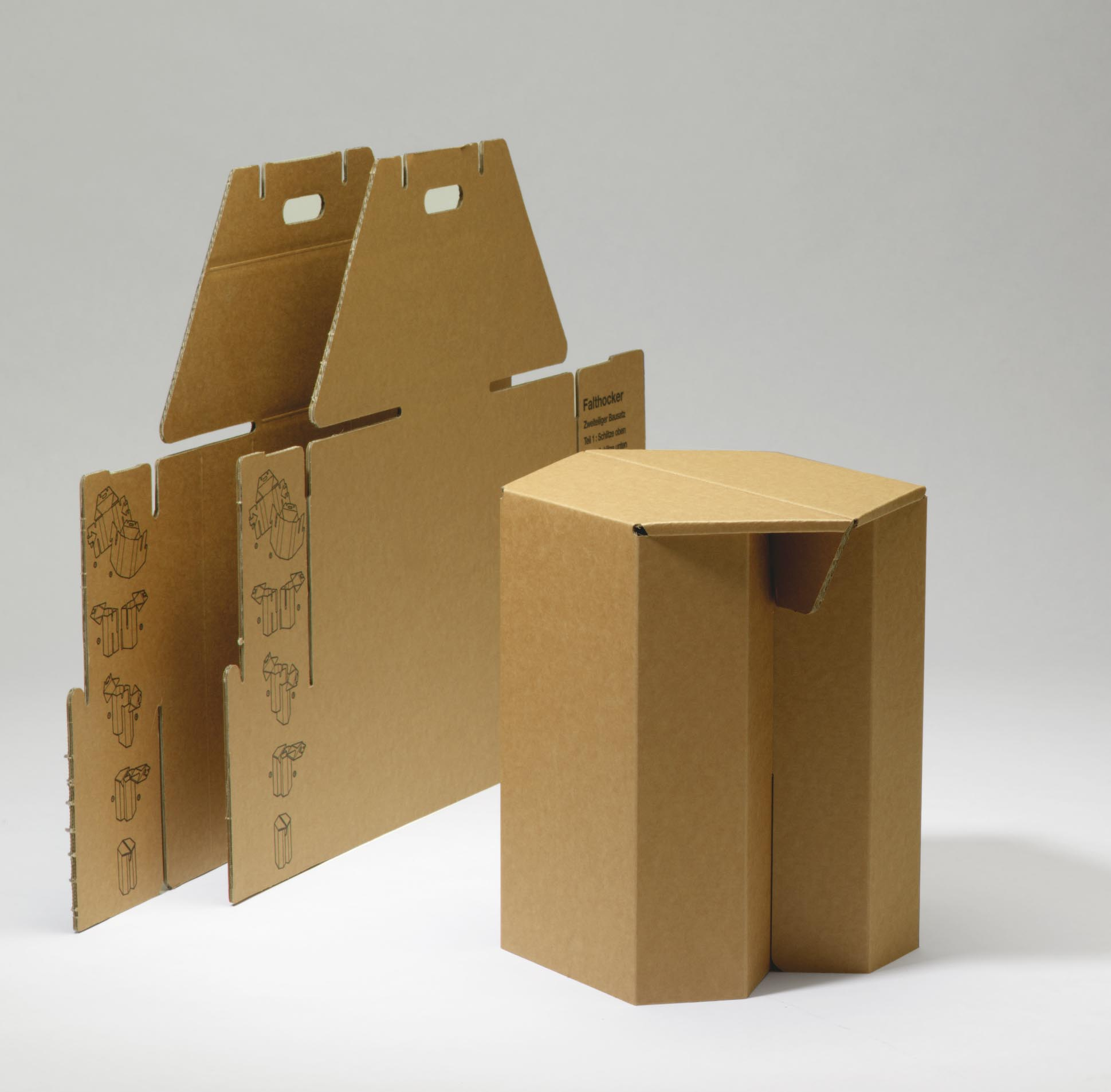
Falthocker cardboard stool, by Hans-Peter Stange, Berlin 1979

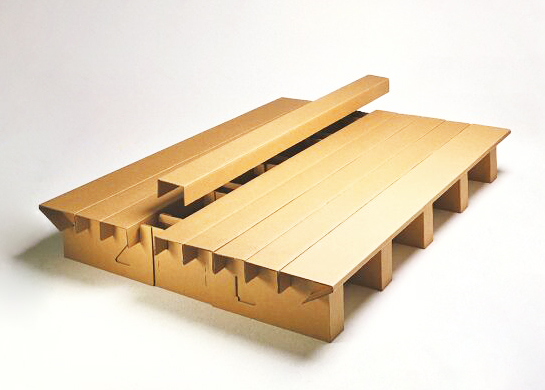
Pappbett cardboard bed, by Hans-Peter Stange, Berlin 1989

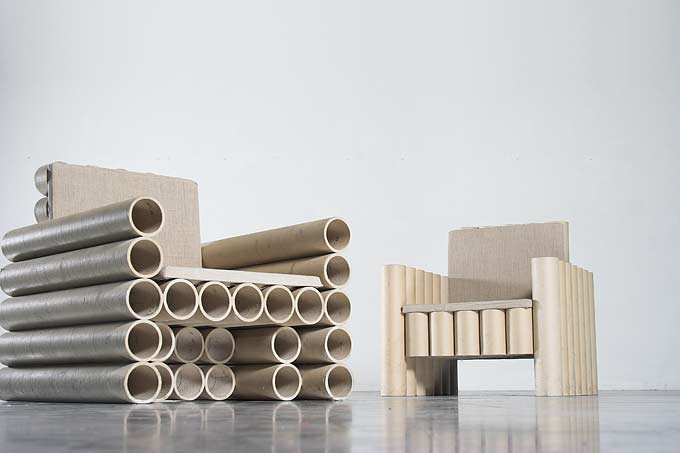
Paper tube chair by Manfred Kielnhofer, 2002

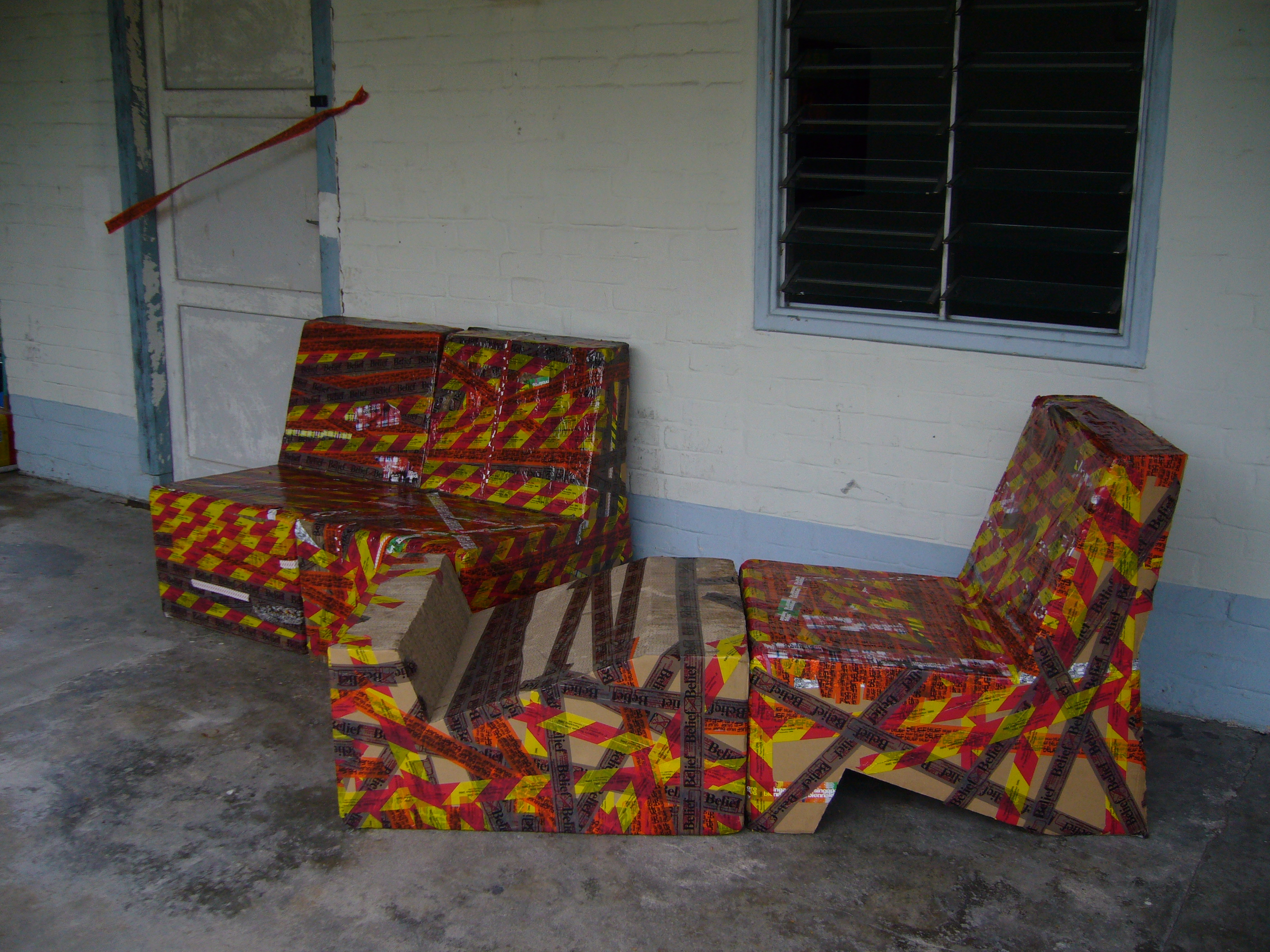
Modular cardboard furniture by Mark Wee, Robin Wau & Jonathan Choe

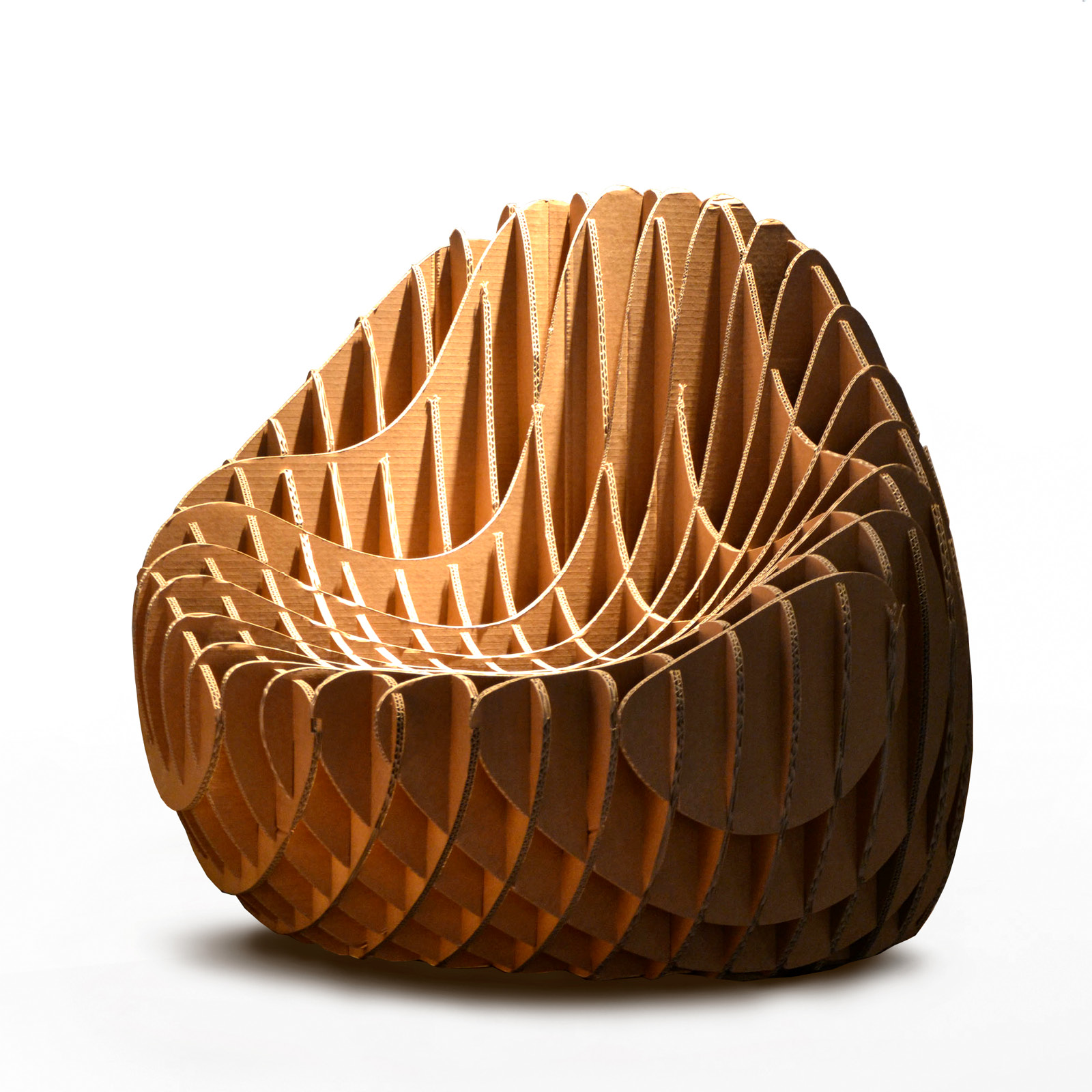
Cardboard Orthogrid Chair MC 205 by Nordwerk Design, 2013

== Consumer market ==
Cardboard furniture mainly is classified as ready-to-assemble furniture (RTA), taking advantage of the low weight of cardboard and the ability to flatpack easily. As of 2020, the RTA consumer market in the USA alone was estimated to be worth 13.8 billion dollars with large companies being less dominant than widely expected, but facing competition from regional chains, making drop shipping economically interesting for smaller companies. The 2021 European Union market is estimated to be worth over 15 billion Euro. Furthermore, cardboard furniture generally appeals to a younger demographic, such as Millennials or Gen-Z, leaving potential for growth. At this point, none of the major furniture producers has entered the cardboard furniture market.

However, whether cardboard furniture only remains a trend or not is still debated.

== Products and material ==
The market offers various cardboard furniture designs, such as beds, benches, chairs, shelves, stools, tables, and many more. Not all types of cardboard can be used for every type of furniture. Generally, to make cardboard furniture, heavy paperboard, corrugated fibreboard (including inverted corrugated board), honeycomb cardboard and core material without a liner are all being used. Also, the liner can alternate between Test- and Kraftliner, depending on the design.

== Perception of cardboard furniture ==
Cardboard as a material generally is viewed negatively when used as a primary material for furniture or as a building material in general. Several studies and research programs have been conducted, entering not only into structural questions, but also questions of acceptance. Examples are programs such as BAMP at the University of Darmstadt, the CATSE program at ETH Zürich, Cardboard Technical Research and Developments at TU Delft and others. One potential reason is the widely fragmented cardboard industry with thin corrugated cardboard used for packaging as the primary material for potential consumers to mainly get in contact with, depreciating the material in consumers perception in general without differentiating between cheap packaging material and high-performance paper-boards.

On the design side, a 2018 study at GuangDong University of Technology researched consumer perception of cardboard furniture depending on the design using eye tracking technology. The researchers found that simpler, more familiar shapes are more likely to lead to a positive purchasing decisions, with recognition of familiar shapes as a driving factor. However, this study has been conducted in China. Therefore, the cultural background in comparison to western consumption behaviour must be taken into consideration.

In order to elevate the perception of cardboard furniture, German-Canadian design studio Nordwerk Design published construction plans for cardboard furniture for free in 2020, arguing that it requires a critical mass of consumers to lead to a shift in the general perception and that this only can be achieved by getting as much quality design out as possible.

== See also ==
- Cardboard
- Cardboard modelling
- Corrugated box design
- Furniture design
- Paperboard

== Literature ==
- Dry, Graham. "Hans Günther Reinstein und seine Möbel aus Pappe". In: Kunst in Hessen und am Mittelrhein (1982) 22, pp. 131 ff.
- Martens, Bob. "Das Kartonmöbel". Wien: Technische Universität Wien, 1995, ISBN 3-901153-03-9
- Minke, Gemot. "Bauen mit Pappe". In: DBZ (1977) 11, pp. 1497–1500.
- Schreibmayer, Peter. "Cardboards. Bauen mit Pappe." In: Architektur Aktuell (1991) 146, pp. 20–21.
- Digel, Marion. "Papermade. Wohnen mit Objekten aus Papier und Karton", München 2002, ISBN 3-576-11580-3
- Leblois, Olivier. "Carton. Mobilier/Éco-Design/Architecture", Marseille 2008, ISBN 978-2-86364-186-6
- Begleitbuch zur Ausstellung "Einrichten – Leben in Karton", Städtische Galerie Villa Zanders, Bergisch-Gladbach 2008
- Cardboardbook (Ginko Press 2010), ISBN 978-1-58423-371-8
- Soroka, Walter. "Illustrated Glossary of Packaging Terminology", 2008, ISBN 978-1-930268-27-2
