= Osaka University of Arts =

Private art school in Osaka, Japan

Coordinates: 34°30′39″N 135°37′55″E

- Type: Private
- Established: Founded 1945
- Location: Kanan, Osaka, Japan
- Website: www.osaka-geidai.ac.jp/

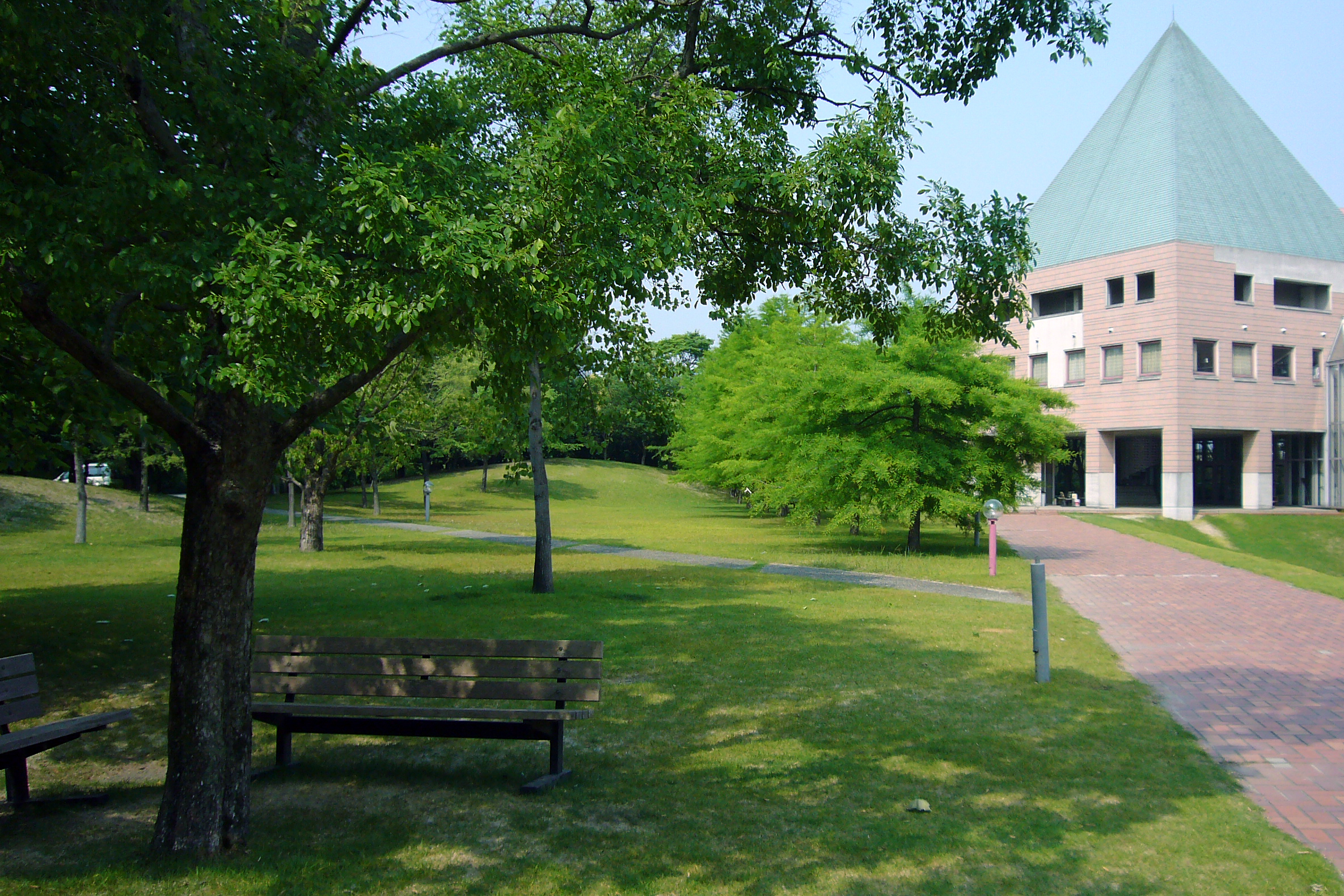
Itami campus

Osaka University of Arts (大阪芸術大学, Ōsaka Geijutsu Daigaku) is a private arts university located in Kanan, Minamikawachi District, Osaka Prefecture, Japan. The university was founded in 1945 as Hirano English Cram School (平野英学塾, Hirano Eigakujuku), changing its name to Osaka School of the Fine Arts (大阪美術学校, Ōsaka Bijutsu Gakkō) in 1957, and then to Naniwa University of the Arts (浪速芸術大学, Naniwa Geijutsu Daigaku) in 1964. The university adopted the current name in 1966.

== Notable teachers ==
- Toshiyuki Hosokawa
- Takeji Iwamiya
- Kazuo Koike
- Sadao Nakajima
- Kazuki Ōmori
- Go Nagai
- Teruaki Georges Sumioka, Full Professor of Philosophy
- Kei Nakano, Associate Professor of Surrealism, Arts, Crafts and Music
- Miho Morikawa, Professor - Music Performance Department

== Notable alumni ==
- Takami Akai, illustrator
- Hideaki Anno, animation and film director
- Kiyohiko Azuma, manga author and illustrator
- Arata Furuta, actor
- Satoshi Hashimoto, voice actor
- Tenpei Nakamura, pianist
- Katsunori Ozaki, pianist
- Kenjiro Hata, manga artist
- Uta Isaki, manga artist
- Toshio Kakei, actor
- Koji Kanemoto
- Shinichiro Kimura, anime director
- Toshiyuki Kita, furniture designer
- Takashi Tezuka, video game designer at Nintendo
- Yoshiaki Koizumi, video game designer at Nintendo
- Koji Kondo, video game composer at Nintendo
- Kenji Yamamoto, video game composer at Nintendo
- Meimu
- Masahiko Minami, anime producer
- Range Murata, illustrator and designer
- Ramo Nakajima
- Akira Nishimori
- Masami Okui
- Yoshio Kashiguchi, clarinet
- Masanori Sera, singer and actor
- Ai Otsuka, singer
- Junji Naoe, composer and music coordinator
- Yoshio Sakamoto, video game designer at Nintendo
- Setsuji Satō
- Kazuhiko Shimamoto, manga artist
- Masamune Shirow, manga artist
- Hiroshi Takano
- Novala Takemoto
- Fumito Ueda, director of Ico and Shadow of the Colossus
- Kanako Urai, professional wrestler
- Kazuyoshi Kumakiri, film director
- Hiroyuki Yamaga, anime director and producer
- Nobuhiro Yamashita, film director
- Kentarō Yano, manga artist
- Jownmakc, Bandes dessinées artist, filmmaker
- Kazuyuki Okitsu, voice actor
- Masakazu Ishiguro, manga artist
- Monami Ohno, sculpture artist
