= WVLC (paper) =

WVLC stands for "White Vat Lined Chip" (a.k.a. white vat) and is type of chipboard with white sides. It is used when a white interior is desired. A good example would be a white shoe box.

== See also ==
- White Lined Chipboard
