= Folding boxboard =

Paperboard grade made of multiple layers

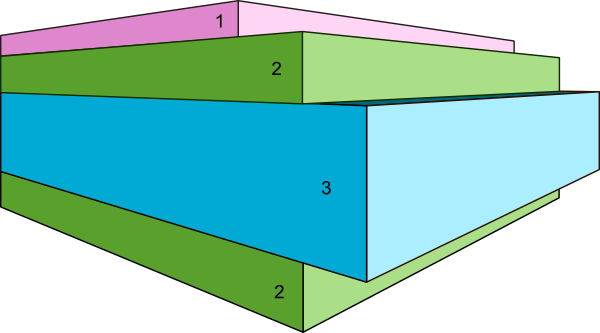
FBB construction: 1 Coating 2 Bleached chemical pulp 3 Mechanical pulp

Folding boxboard, also referred to as FBB or by the DIN Standard 19303 codes of GC or UC, is a paperboard grade made up of multiple layers of chemical and mechanical pulp. This grade is made up of mechanical pulp in between two layers of chemical pulp. The top layer is of bleached chemical pulp with an optional pigment coating. This is a low-density material with high stiffness and a slightly yellow colour, mainly on the inside. The major end uses of folding boxboard are health and beauty products, frozen, chilled and other foods, confectionaries, pharmaceuticals, graphical uses and cigarettes.

== See also ==
- Solid bleached board
- Solid unbleached board
- White lined chipboard
