= Monami Ohno =

Japanese sculpture artist

- Born: 24 October 1991 (age 34)
- Website: https://mbrid01.wixsite.com/monamour-monaroom

Monami Ohno (born 24 October 1991) is a Japanese contemporary artist and sculptor who works with cardboard to create intricate sculptures. Subjects of her sculptures are varied, including vehicles, tanks, monsters like Godzilla, instruments, and realistic looking food packaging.

== Career ==
Ohno attended the Osaka University of Arts, she had become inspired to become an animator after watching Neon Genesis Evangelion. She first began working with cardboard during a stop motion animation assignment. Wanting to save money, she began working with the cardboard boxes that her Amazon orders arrived in. Her work received positive feedback and she began to focus on creating more cardboard sculptures.

Originally Ohno's work was flat, as she struggled to produce 3D shapes out of the material. But as her skills developed, the scale and complexity of the figures grew. When beginning a work, she draws a rough sketch on cardboard to figure out the scale before cutting out the design. When assembling her sculptures she uses glue and water to help shape cardboard. To create depth in her sculptures Ohno cuts the surface layer of the cardboard, exposing the corrugated inside.

In 2023 her work was featured in The Hidden World of Stationery Art exhibition held in Nihombashi Takashimaya Shopping Center.

In 2024 a solo exhibition of her work was held at the Kaiyodo Space Factory Nankoku. Another solo exhibition was held in May, in Kichijoji, Tokyo.
