= The Cardboards =

American band

The Cardboards were one of the first bands in the local independent/experimental/punk/new wave scene in Pittsburgh, Pennsylvania, from around 1979 till 1985. There were two Cardboards lineups. Originally, they consisted of:

- Drummer: Bill Bored
- Synthesist: Ron Solo
- Saxophone: Keeth Teeth
- Vocalist: Max Haste

When Keith (Kevin Brunelle) moved on, they replaced him with Ivan, another synthesist. After Ivan left the band, she was replaced by synthesist/vocalist Marie Alexander. The band played two further gigs and then disbanded. There were backup singers on the recording Mary Ann, Maryann, Kim, and Liz.

The drummer, Bill Bored (Bill von Hagen), had previously played in The Puke, before he ever actually could play drums for real. He was also a member of the Pittsburgh band 24 Minutes. He later went on to help found The Cynics, a popular garage band which was still playing as of 2005.

Ron Solo and Marie Alexander went on to form Hector in Paris, a synthpop/new wave band, along with Philip Harris and Jim Laugelli. Max Haste (Joe O'Lear) was not only a singer but a gifted storyteller, and could frequently hold an unruly crowd's attention telling short stories and talking between songs, sometimes using props such as a box of oats or a "Pop-up Pirate" toy. He was studying medicine at the time, and always had a great disease-of-the-week story based on whatever he was studying at the time (and which he frequently thought he was coming down with).

Solo pioneered the unusual technique of taping his fingertips with electrical tape, to avoid injury when bringing his fingers down on his synthesizer keys rapidly from chin height. This rapid, aggressive technique can be heard clearly in their single "Gravity's Still Working". Since Ron's synth was an early Maxi-Korg, the Cardboards' most precious possession was Ron's book of settings, in which was recorded the setting of every knob, switch, and slider for all of the Cardboards' songs. Ivan also had a book of settings for her keyboard. When she left the Cardboards, she passed the book on to Marie and sold her the synthesizer. They released one EP, "Greatest Hits Volume 2" (a 12-inch release that played at 45 rpm), which included the songs "On the R => T Z", "Electrical Generator", "Copa Cobana", "Gravity's Still Working", and "Bill's Rap".
