= Iggesund =

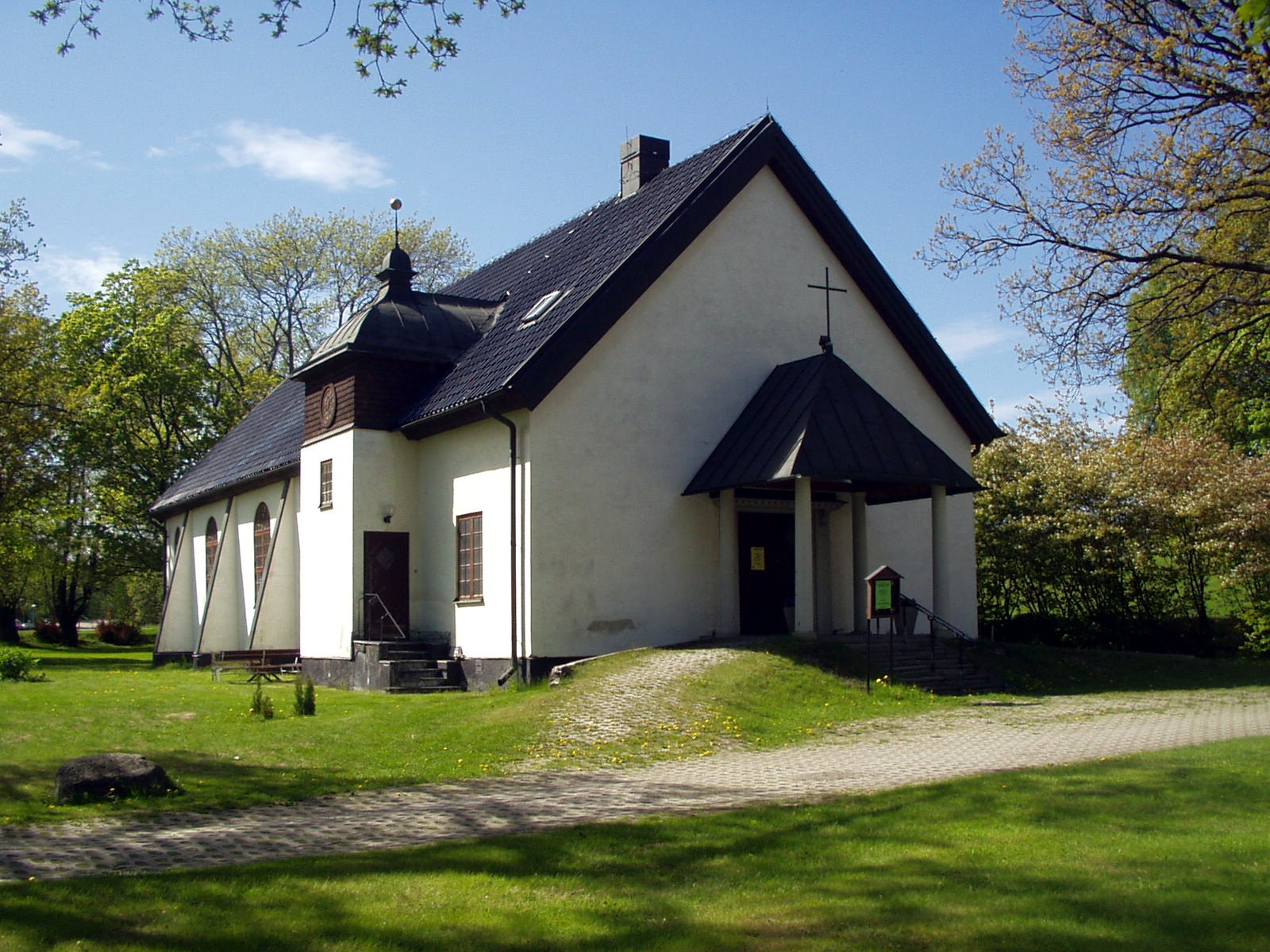
- Iggesund Church

- Location within Sweden Gävleborg Location within Sweden
- Coordinates: 61°38′N 17°04′E
- Country: Sweden
- Province: Hälsingland
- County: Gävleborg County
- Municipality: Hudiksvall Municipality

Area
  - Total: 4.12 km^{2} (1.59 sq mi)

Population (31 December 2010)
  - Total: 3,365
  - Density: 815/km^{2} (2,110/sq mi)
- Time zone: UTC+1 (CET)
  - Summer (DST): UTC+2 (CEST)

Iggesund is a locality situated in Hudiksvall Municipality, Gävleborg County, Sweden with 3,362 inhabitants in 2010.

== Geography ==
Iggesund is located 10 km (6.2 mi) south of Hudiksvall, 45 km (28 mi) north of Söderhamn and 70 km (43 mi) southeast of Ljusdal, with the Bothnian Sea to the east. The nearest bigger cities are Sundsvall (pop. 49,339) 92 km (57 mi) to the north, and Gävle (pop. 68,700) 126 km (78 mi) to the south.

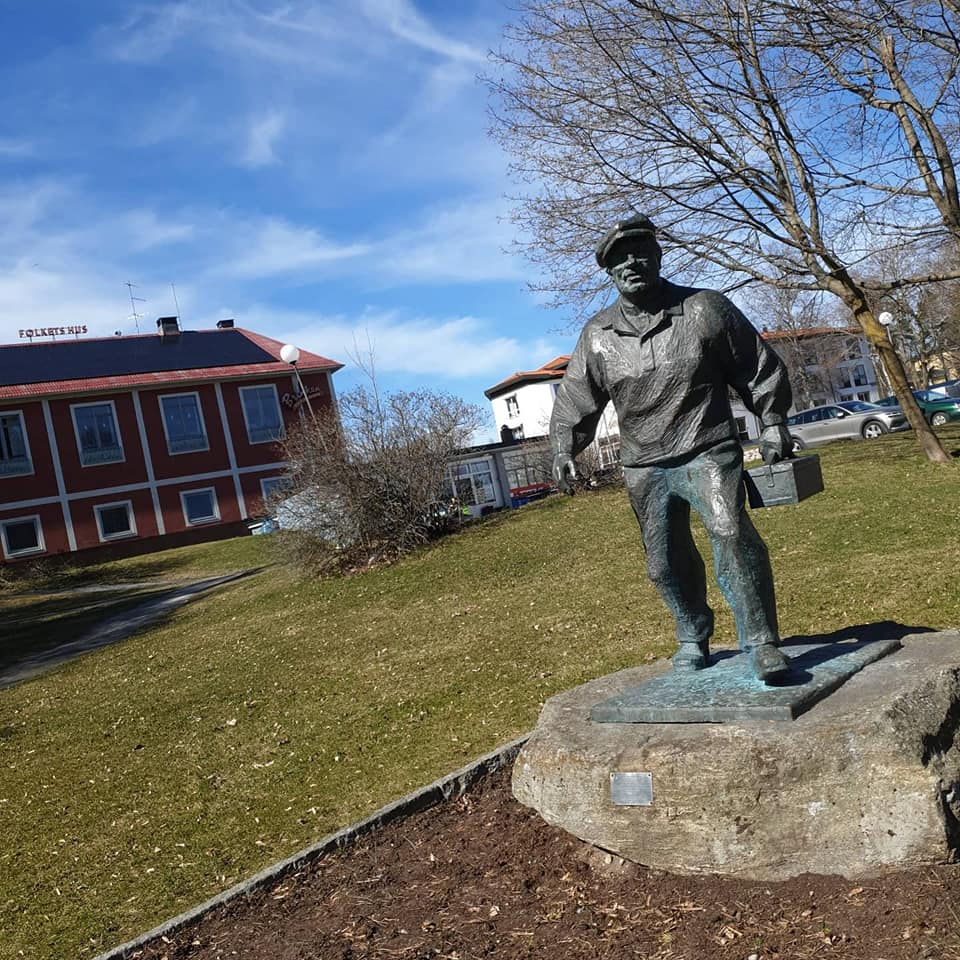
Iggesund local centre, with the statue of 'The Worker'

== History ==
Iggesund was mentioned for the first time during the 15th century. At the time Iggesund consisted only of a few farms on both sides of the Iggåns.

- 1546 – Swedish king Gustav Vasa established an eel fishery at the Iggån.
- 1672 – Östanå paper mills were built on the northern shore of the Viksjön lake. They represented the first major industry in Iggesund.
- 1685 – Iggesund's industrial era began with the completion of the Iggesunds Bruk iron mill. Iggesund slowly transformed from an agricultural into an industrial town. With the steady expansion of Iggesunds Bruk the town's name slowly turned into a synonym for the mill.
- 1721 – Russians troops burned down a large part of the industry and town.

=== Name ===
- around 1400: Igesunda
- around 1500: Egesund, Eghesund, Eggesund, Iggesund, Iggsund

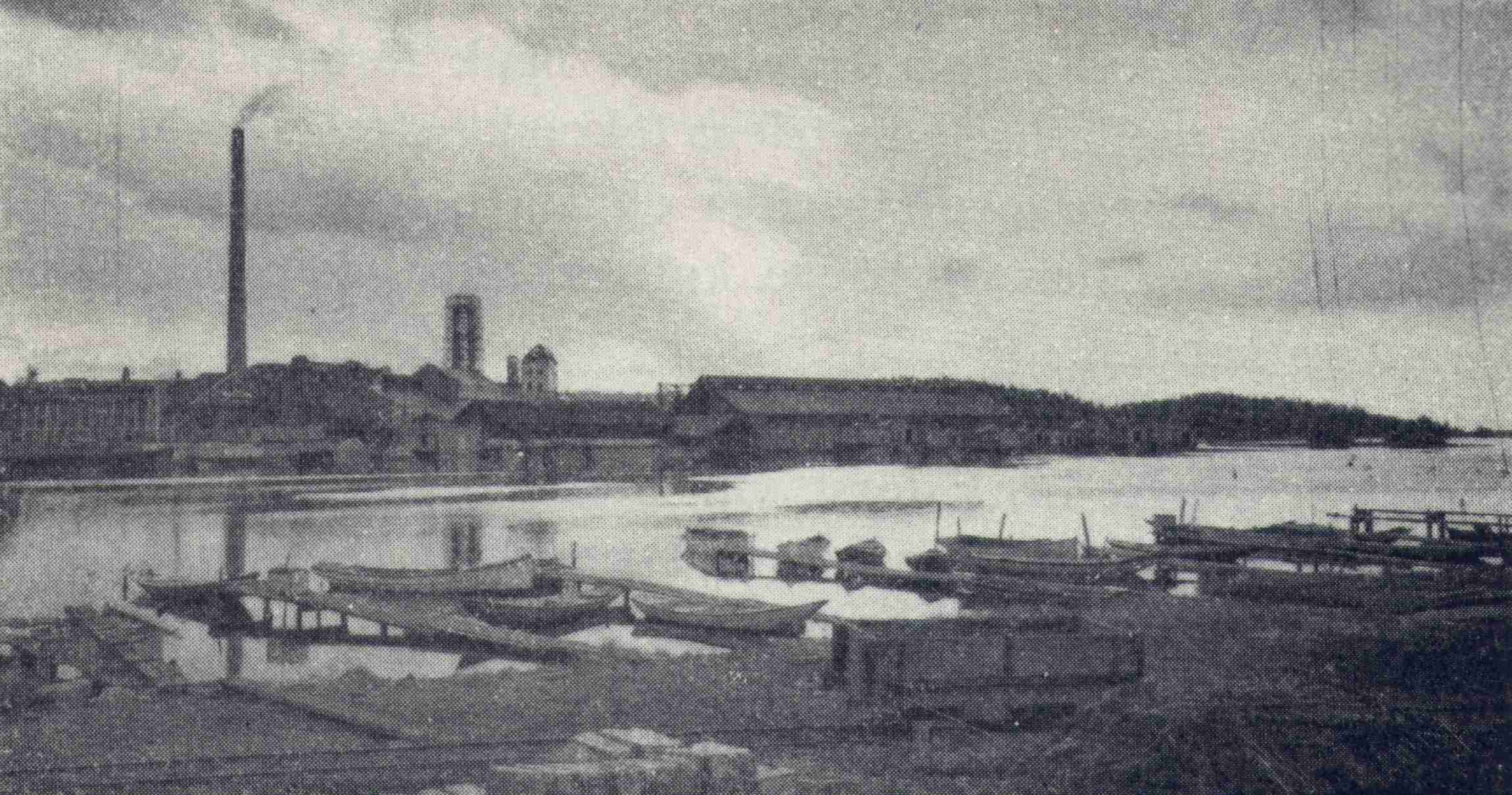
Iggesund iron mill, 1923
