= Solid unbleached board =

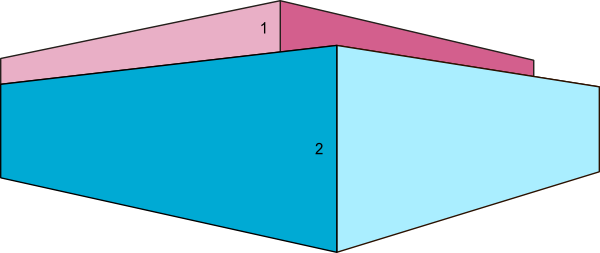
SUB construction: 1 – Coating 2 – Solid Unbleached Board Not drawn to scale

Solid unbleached board, also known as SUB, is a grade of paperboard typically made of unbleached chemical pulp. Most often it comes with two to three layers of mineral or synthetic pigment coating on the top and one layer on the reverse side. Recycled fibres are sometimes used to replace the unbleached chemical pulp.

The main end use for this type of board is for packaging of frozen or chilled food, beverage carriers, detergent, cereals, shoes, toys, and others.

== See also ==
- Folding boxboard
- Solid bleached board
- White lined chipboard
