= White-lined chipboard =

Grade of paperboard

WLC construction: 1) Two or three coating layers 2) Pulp or white recovered fiber 3) Recovered fibre underliner 4) One or more layers of mixed and/or recovered fiber 5) Pulp or white recovered fiber 6) Back coating

White-lined chipboard (also referred to as WLC, GD, GT or UD) is a grade of paperboard typically made from layers of waste paper or recycled fibers. Most often it comes with two to three layers of coating on the top and one layer on the reverse side. Because of its recycled content it will be grey from the inside. The main end use for this type of board is for packaging of frozen or chilled food, cereals, shoes, toys and others.

Health risks have been associated with using recycled material in direct food contact. Swiss studies have shown that recycled material can contain significant portions of mineral oil, which may migrate into packaged foods. (Mineral oil levels of up to 19.4 mg/kg were found in rice packed in recycled board.)

== See also ==
- Folding boxboard
- Solid bleached board
- Solid unbleached board
- WVLC (paper)
