= Chilled food =

Food stored at refrigeration temperatures

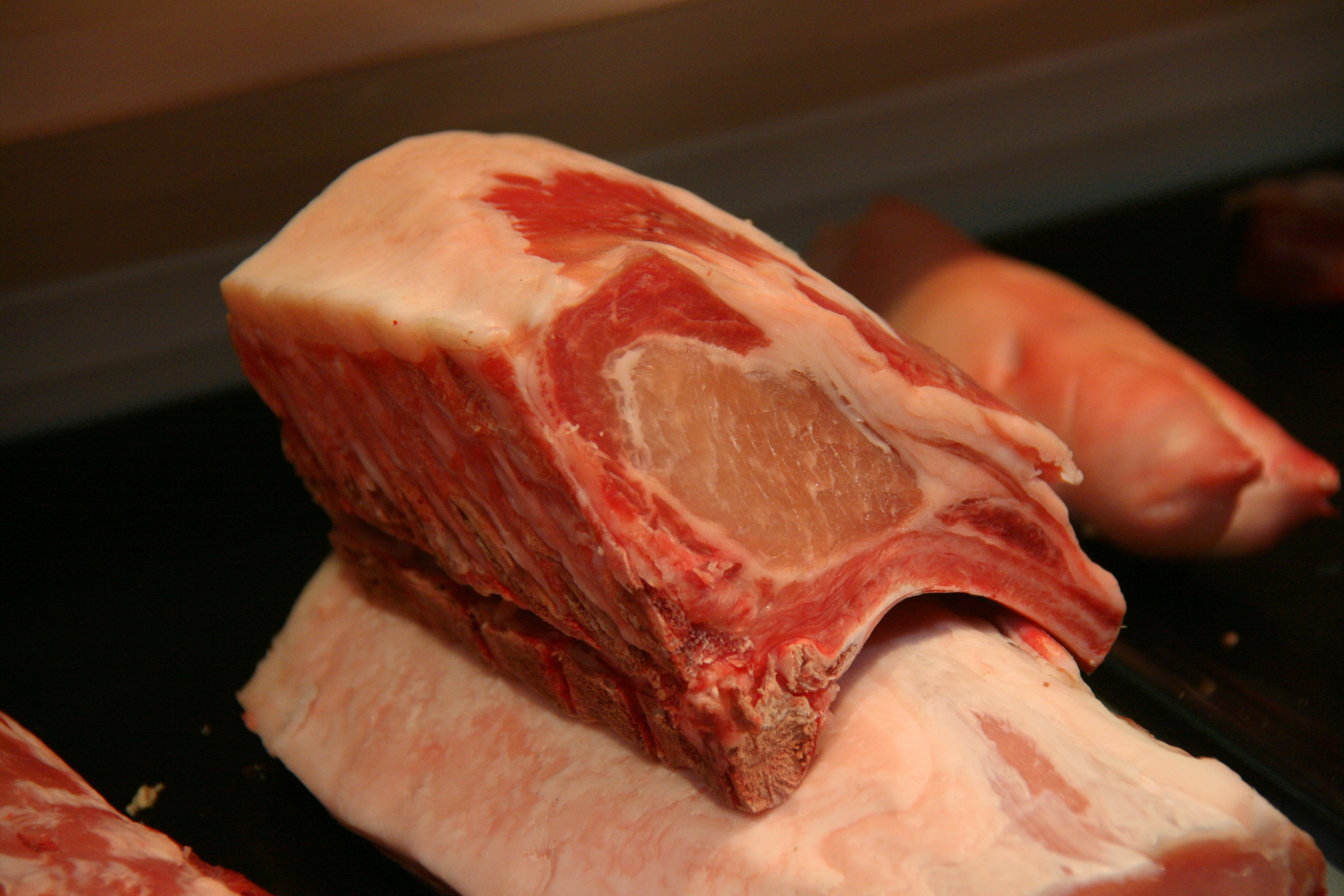
Pork ribs

Chilled food is food that is stored at refrigeration temperatures, which are at or below 0 – −5 °C (32–23 °F). The key requirements for chilled food products are good quality and microbiological safety at the point of consumption. They have been available in the United Kingdom, United States, and many other industrialized countries since the 1961s.

== History ==
The first chilled foods in the 1960s were sliced meats and pies.

By the next decade (1970s), household refrigerators were stocked with salad dressings and dairy desserts.

In the 1980s, TV dinners, quiches, flans, sandwiches, pizzas, ethnic snacks, pastas, and soups were kept chilled.

Nondairy desserts, sandwich fillings, dips, sauces, stocks, prepared fruit and vegetables, and leafy salads were commonly chilled in the 1990s.

Specialty breads, condiments, sushi, and meal kits were typical by the 2000s. Storage mediums being used are ziploc bags, vacuum sealed bags, pastry boxes, and microwavable plastic containers.

== Popularity ==
The chilled food sector is one of the fastest growing sectors in the food industry and chilled foods currently represent about 10% of all of the United Kingdom's retail foods by value. One of the largest sectors is the chilled recipe dish sector, which has grown from an estimated £173 million in 1988 to over £1,750 million in 2005. The total UK chilled prepared food market was an estimated £7,187 million in 2004 and £13,126 million in 2018, and continues to evolve, reflecting consumers’ changing needs and lifestyles.

In 2004, over 80% of UK households bought a chilled prepared meal with over 40% buying one within any given month.
