= Solid bleached board =

Paperboard grade

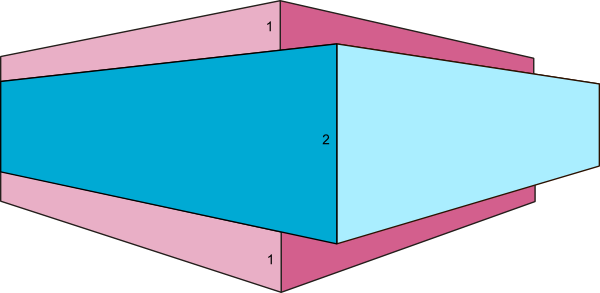
SBB (C2S) construction: 1 - Coating 2 - Bleached chemical pulp 1 - Coating Not drawn to scale

Solid bleached board (SBB) or solid bleached sulphate (SBS) is a virgin fibre grade of paperboard.

This grade is made purely from bleached chemical pulp and usually has a mineral or synthetic pigment coated top surface in one or more layers (C1S) and often also a coating on the reverse side (C2S). It is a medium density board with good printing properties for graphical and packaging end uses and is perfectly white both inside and out. It can easily be cut, creased, hot foil stamped and embossed. Its other properties, such as being hygienic and pure with no smell and taste, make it usable for packaging aroma and flavour sensitive products such as chocolate, cigarettes and cosmetics.

Applications of solid bleached board include folding cartoons, cups and plates, and liquid packaging.

== See also ==
- Folding boxboard
- Solid unbleached board
- White lined chipboard
