= Paperboard =

Thick paper-based material

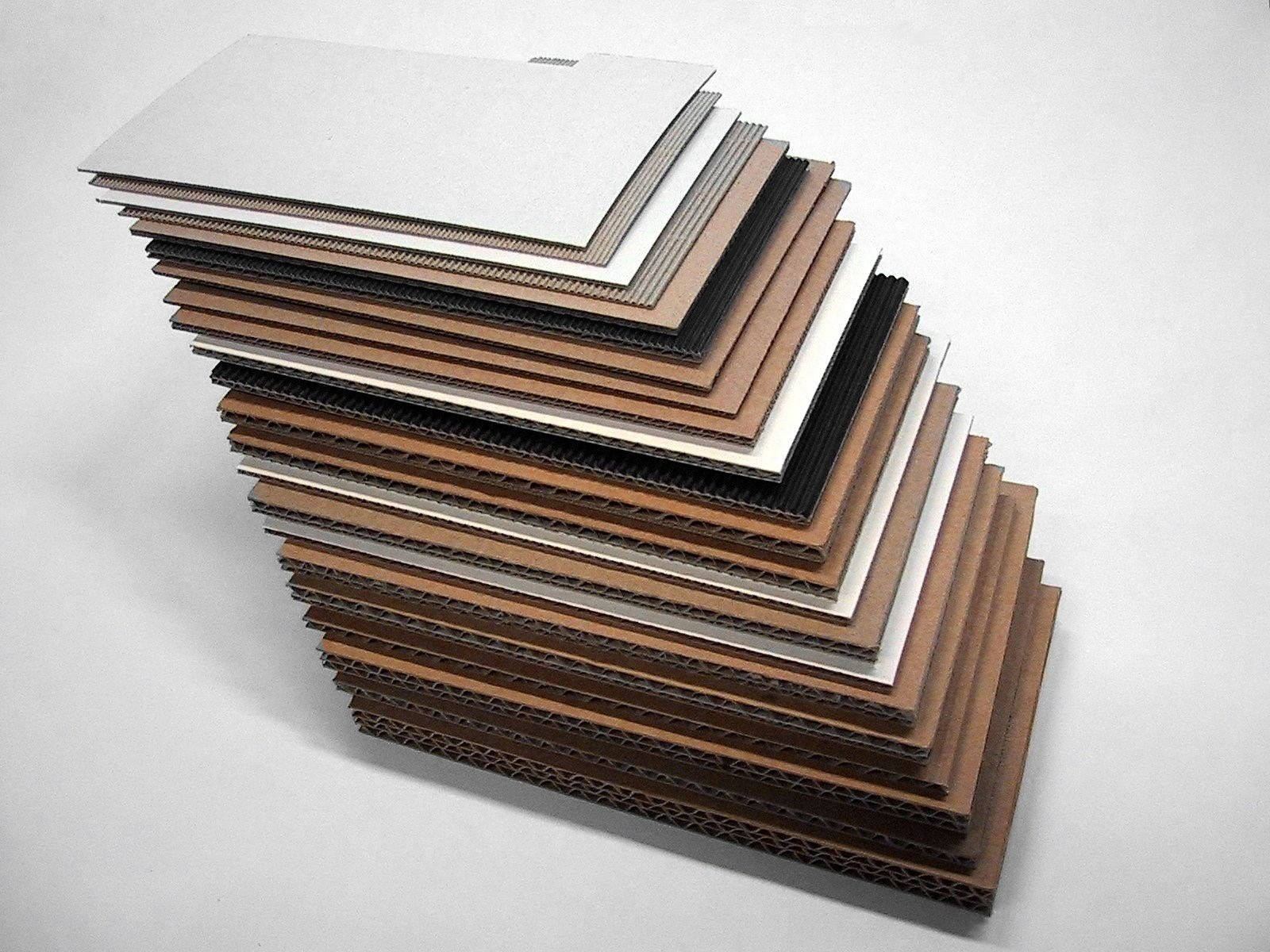
Corrugated fiberboard made from paperboard

Paperboard is a thick paper-based material. According to ISO standards, paperboard is a paper with a grammage above 250 g/m^{2}, but there are exceptions. Paperboard can be single- or multi-ply. The related term box board dates at least to the 1790s. Terminology and classifications of paperboard are not always uniform.

To produce paperboard, fibrous material is turned into pulp and bleached to create one or more layers of board, which can be optionally coated for a better surface and/or improved appearance. Pulp board is produced on pulping machines that can handle higher grammage than paper and several plies.

== Description ==
Paperboard is a thick paper-based material. While there is no rigid differentiation between paper and paperboard, paperboard is generally thicker (usually over 0.30 mm, 0.012 in, or 12 points) than paper and has certain superior attributes such as foldability and rigidity. According to ISO standards, paperboard is a paper with a grammage above 250 g/m^{2}, but there are exceptions. Paperboard can be single- or multi-ply.

Paperboard can be easily cut and formed, is lightweight, and because it is strong, is used in packaging. Another end-use is high quality graphic printing, such as book and magazine covers, business cards, brochures, and postcards. Paperboard is also used in fine arts for creating sculptures.

Sometimes it is referred to as cardboard, which is a generic, lay term used to refer to any heavy paper pulp–based board, however this usage is deprecated in the paper, printing, and packaging industries as it does not adequately describe each product type.

== History ==
Box board, with the meaning of "[w]ooden board or cardboard suitable for making boxes" dates at least to the 1790s. In 1817, the first paperboard carton was produced in England. Folding cartons first emerged around the 1860s. To save space, manufacturers shipped them flat, ready for setting up by customers when required. The mechanical die cutting and creasing of blanks was developed in 1879 using a die. That year, the Brooklyn printer and bag maker Robert Gair found that cutting and creasing paperboard in a single operation allowed folding cartons to be mass-produced, after a misplaced creasing rule cut through a run of paper bags. In 1911, the first kraft sulphate mill was built in Florida. In 1915, the gable top milk carton was patented and in 1935 the first dairy plant was observed using them. Ovenable paperboard was introduced in 1974.

== Terminology and classification ==
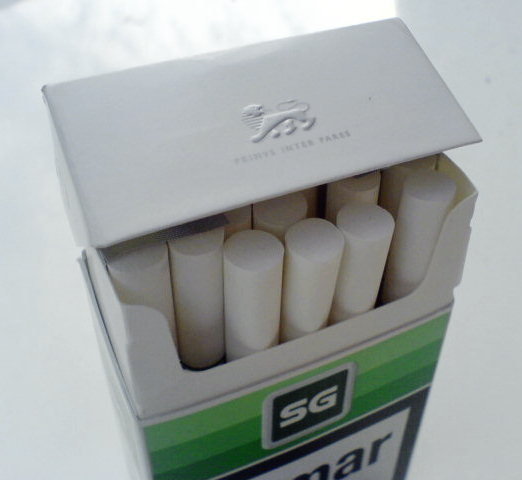
Crush-proof cigarette pack made of folding boxboard

Terminology and classifications of paperboard are not always uniform. Differences occur depending on specific industry, locale, and personal choice. In general, the following are often used:

- Boxboard or cartonboard: paperboard for folding cartons and rigid set-up boxes
  - Folding boxboard (FBB): a bending grade capable of being scored and bending without fracture
  - Chipboard: a recycled, low quality board
    - White lined chipboard (WLC): a white, often clay-coated chipboard
  - Kraft board: a strong virgin fiber board often used for beverage carriers. Often clay-coated for printing
  - Laminated board: a lamination of paperboards and other materials, for example liquid packaging board
  - Solid bleached board (SBB) or solid bleached sulphate (SBS): clean white board used for foods etc. Sulphate refers to the kraft process
  - Solid unbleached board (SUB): board made from unbleached chemical pulp
- Containerboard: a type of paperboard manufactured for the production of corrugated fiberboard
  - Corrugated medium: the inner fluted portion of corrugated fiberboard
  - Linerboard: a strong stiff board for one or both sides of corrugated boxes. It is the flat covering over the corrugating medium.
- Other
  - Binder's board: a paperboard used in bookbinding for making hard covers.

== Production ==
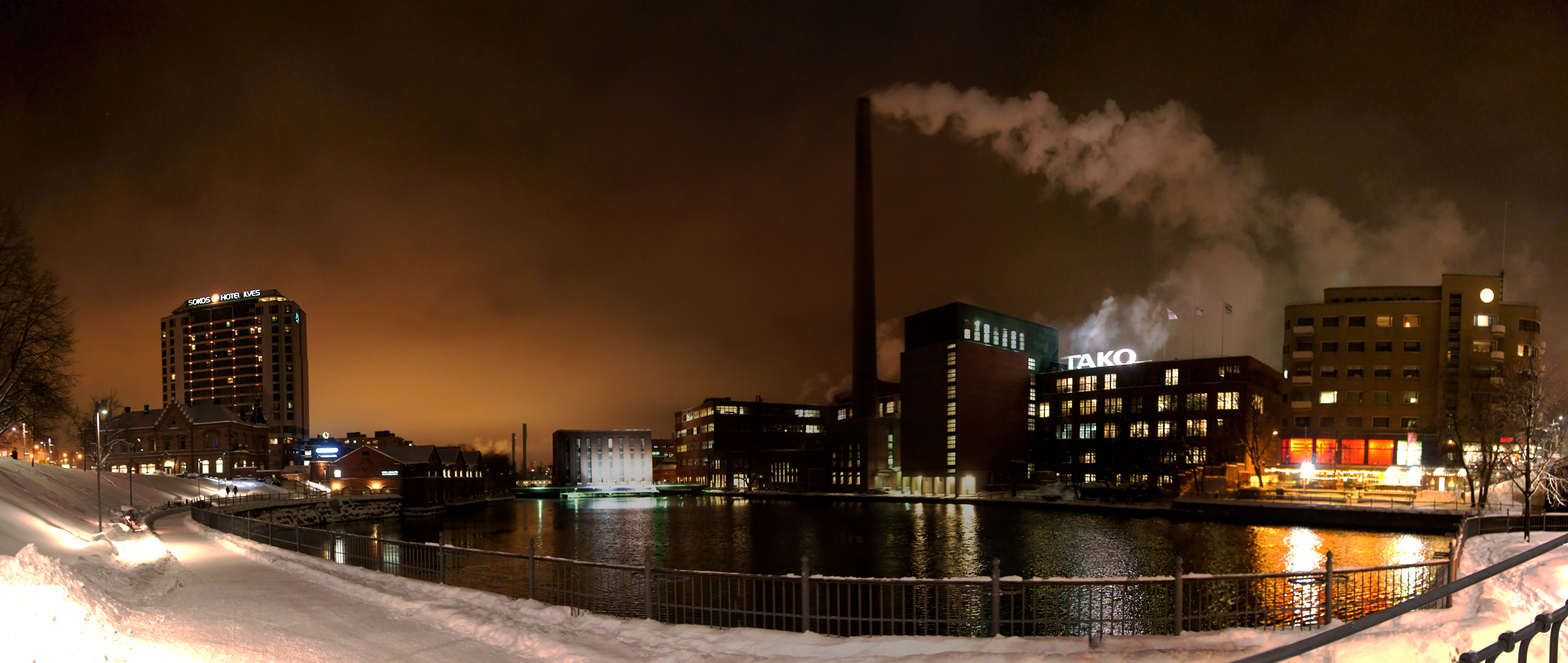
Metsä Board Tako paperboard factory near the Tammerkoski in Tampere, Finland

To produce paperboard, fibrous material is turned into pulp and bleached to create one or more layers of board, which can be optionally coated for a better surface and/or improved appearance. Pulp board is produced on pulping machines that can handle higher grammage and several plies.

=== Raw materials ===
The above-mentioned fibrous material can either come from fresh (virgin) sources (e.g. wood) or from recycled waste paper. Around 90% of virgin paper is made from wood pulp. Today paperboard packaging in general, and especially products from certified sustainable sources, are receiving new attention, as manufacturers dealing with environmental, health, and regulatory issues look to renewable resources to meet increasing demand. It is now mandatory in many countries for paper-based packaging to be manufactured wholly or partially from recycled material.

Raw materials include:

Hardwood
C. 0.05 inches (1.3 mm) in length e.g. Birch which has short fibres. It is generally more difficult to work with; however, it does provide higher tensile strength, but lower tear and other strength properties. Although its fibres are not as long and strong as those in softwood, they make for a stiffer product defined by some stiffness tests. Hardwood fibres fill the sheet better and therefore make a smoother paper that is more opaque and better for printing. Hardwood makes an excellent corrugating medium.
Softwood
C. 0.13 inches (3.3 mm) in length e.g. Pine and spruce which have typically long fibres and make superior paperboard in services where strength is important. Softwood makes excellent linerboard.
Recycled
Used paper is collected and sorted and usually mixed with virgin fibres in order to make new material. This is necessary as the recycled fibre often loses strength when reused; the added virgin fibres enhance strength. Mixed waste paper is not usually deinked (skipping the deinking stage) for paperboard manufacture and hence the pulp may contain traces of inks, adhesives, and other residues which together give it a grey colour. Products made of recycled board usually have a less predictable composition and poorer functional properties than virgin fibre-based boards. Health risks have been associated with using recycled material in direct food contact. Swiss studies have shown that recycled material can contain significant portions of mineral oil, which may migrate into packed foods. Mineral oil levels of up to 19.4 mg/kg were found in rice packed in recycled board.
Others
It is also possible to use the fibres of Sugarcane Bagasse, Straw, Hemp, Cotton, Flax, Kenaf, Abaca and other plant products.

=== Pulping ===
Two principal methods for extracting fibres from their sources are:

- Chemical pulping uses chemical solutions to convert wood into pulp, yielding around 30% less than mechanical pulping; however, pulp made by the kraft process has superior strength
- Thermo mechanical pulp is a two-stage process which results in a very high yield of wood fibres at the expense of strength.

==== Bleaching ====
Pulp used in the manufacture of paperboard can be bleached to decrease colour and increase purity. Virgin fibre pulp is naturally brown in colour, because of the presence of lignin. Recycled paperboard may contain traces of inks, bonding agents and other residue which colors it grey. Although bleaching is not necessary for all end-uses, it is vital for many graphical and packaging purposes. There are various methods of bleaching, which are used according to a number of factors for example, the degree of colour change required, chemicals chosen and method of treatment. There are three categories of bleaching methods:

- Bleaching by delignification using chlorine gas, which is a method that has been largely replaced by procedures which are gentler to the environment such as the use of oxygen as a replacement for the chlorine gas.
- Bleaching by oxidation using chemicals such as chlorine dioxide, hydrogen peroxide or sodium hypochlorite.
- Bleaching by reduction using chemicals such as sodium bisulphite.

=== Plies ===
(1) single-ply vs. (2) multi-ply

Multi-ply paperboard generally has higher creasing and folding performance than single-ply as a result of layering different types of pulp into a single product. In cases where the same kind of pulp is being used in several layers, each separate layer is treated and shaped individually in order to create the highest possible quality.

=== Coating ===
In order to improve whiteness, smoothness and gloss of paperboard, one or more layers of coating is applied. Coated paper is usually made up of:

- a pigment, which could be china clay, calcium carbonate or titanium dioxide, usually a combination of two
- an adhesive or binder as styrene-butadiene emulsions or starches and water.

Additional components could be OBA (optical brightening agents).

== Grades ==
The DIN Standard 19303 "Paperboard - Terms and grades" (Publication date : 2005-09) defines different grades of paperboard based on the surface treatment (first letter), the main furnish (second letter) and the colour (non-D grade) or bulk (D grade only) (numbering).

First letter (surface treatment)	Second letter (main furnish)	Number
A: cast-coated; G: pigment coated; U: uncoated	Z: bleached virgin chemical pulp; C: virgin mechanical pulp; N: unbleached virgin chemical pulp; T: recycled/secondary fibre with white, cream or brown reverse; D: recycled/secondary fibre with grey back	All except D grades: 1. white reverse side 2. cream reverse side 3. brown reverse side; D grades only: 1. bulk ≥ 1.45 cm^{3}/g 2. 1.3 cm^{3}/g < bulk < 1.45 cm^{3}/g 3. bulk ≤ 1.3 cm^{3}/g

Example: GC1 would be a "pigment coated", "virgin mechanical pulp" board with a "white reverse side". Often the used paperboard type would be FBB, which was coated on both sides.

== Common terms ==
Basis weight
in the US, it is the weight of 1,000 square feet (93 m^{2}) of the same paperboard; the traditional British definition is the weight, in pound, of 100 of the same board

Brightness
Brightness is a technical term that is defined as the amount of blue-white light that a paper reflects. This property is very subjective and individual to each buyer and end use, as skin colour and food are better reproduced on 'warm' (yellow) whites and not blue whites.

Grammage
The grammage of the paperboard is assessed in accordance ISO 536.
Grammage expresses mass per unit area and is measured in g/m^{2}.

PH
Surface pH is measured on a water extract and is on a scale of 0–14. 0 is acidic, 7 is neutral and 14 is alkaline.

Stiffness
Stiffness is one of the most important properties of paperboard as it affects the ability of cartons to run smoothly through the machine that erects, fills and closes them. Stiffness also gives strength and reduces the propensity of a carton to bulge under the weight of settling flowable contents such as cereals.
Although most paper strength properties increase with increasing sheet density, stiffness does not. A rule of thumb is that stiffness is proportional to the 1.6 power of sheet caliper.
The species of fiber used has an effect on stiffness, other things being equal. Northern softwood species impart superior stiffness compared to southern softwoods.
Other factors which affect board stiffness include coatings and moisture content.

Smoothness
Smoothness is particularly important when being used for printing, the smoother the paperboard, the better the image quality, because of better ink coverage. Smoothness is measured using air leak methods – the greater the rate of air leakage, at a specific air pressure, from under a cylindrical knife placed on the surface, the rougher the surface.

Caliper/thickness
In the United States caliper is usually expressed in thousandths of an inch (0.001") or points, where a sheet of paperboard with a thickness of 0.024" would be 24 points. In Europe it is often sold in g/m^{2}, however the thickness of the board is measured in micron (μm). Paperboard also tends to be referred to with thickness rather than weight.

Whiteness
It refers ideally to the equal presence of all colours, because a truly white sheet will reflect all wavelengths of visible light equally.

== Uses ==
Paperboard is commonly used for packaging dry foods such as cereal and pasta, frozen meals, snack containers, and chewing gum packaging. It also serves in packaging medicines, personal care products and hygiene items, as well as electronic items.

In construction, paperboard tubes are widely used as formwork for casting concrete columns and structural elements. They are a cost-effective and lightweight alternative to metal or plastic molds. Research indicates that paper-based products can provide structural stability as well as thermal and acoustic insulation. These properties make paperboard a viable eco-friendly alternative to certain traditional building materials.

== Paperboard industry ==
The paperboard sector is mainly looked at in conjunction with the paper industry. The Paper & Paperboard market size (2007) had a value of US$630.9 billion and a volume of 320.3 million metric tons. Of that market 40.1% is European. About 50% of all produced paper is used for packaging, followed by printing and writing. According to ProCarton, the consumption of paper and paperboard seem to correlate with economic trends (GDP). Sales of carton in Europe sum up to around 8 billion Euros worth.

Over 1,100 printers produce 5.4 million tonnes of cartonboard yearly. Cartons make up one third of paper and board packaging and 15% of all packaging. A bit more than half (54%) of the European carton is produced using recovered fibre or waste paper.

The paper and paperboard industry is quite energy and capital intensive. Just a coated board machine itself can cost around 90 - 120 million Euros (about 125 - US$166 million in 11/2011). Economies of scale apply, because of which a few large players often dominate the market place. E.g. in North America the top 5 producers have a market share of 85%.

== See also ==
- Card stock
- Coated paper
- Fiberboard
- Kraft paper
- Papermaking
- Slip sheet
- Homasote
