= Bicycle basket =

Bicycle-mounted basket for carrying cargo

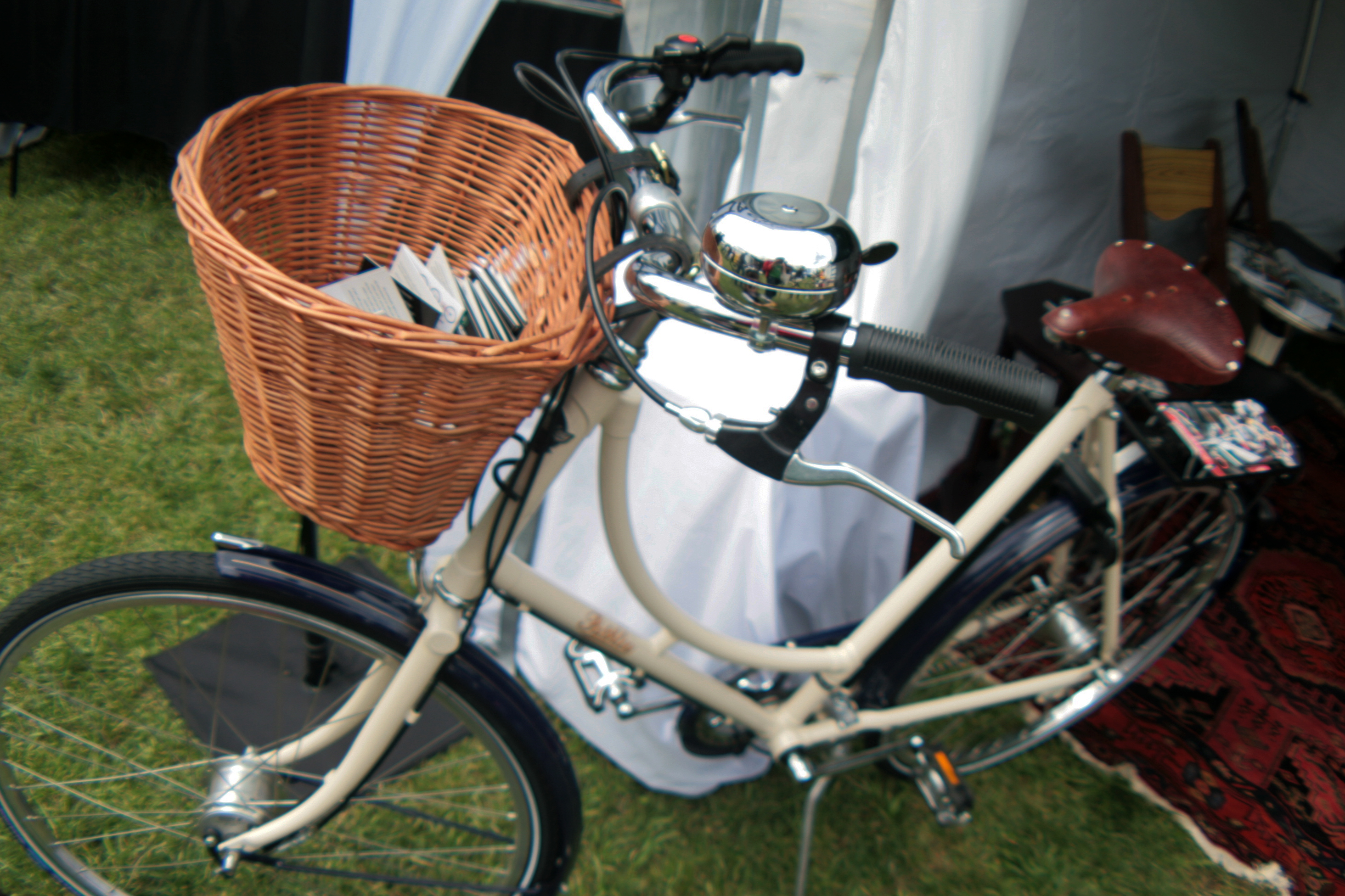
Pashley bicycle with a front wicker basket.

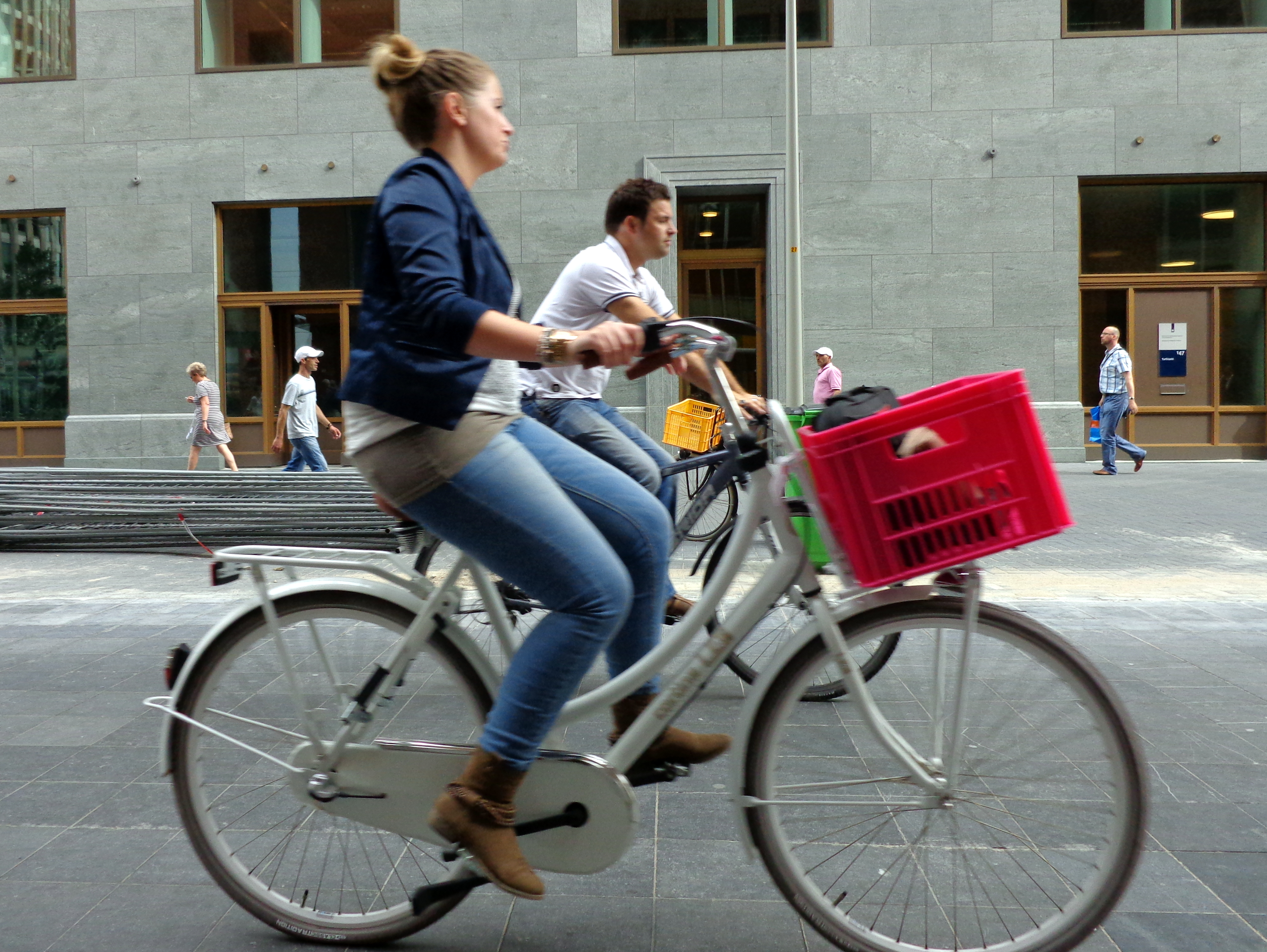
Woman on a utility bicycle with a red eurobox front basket

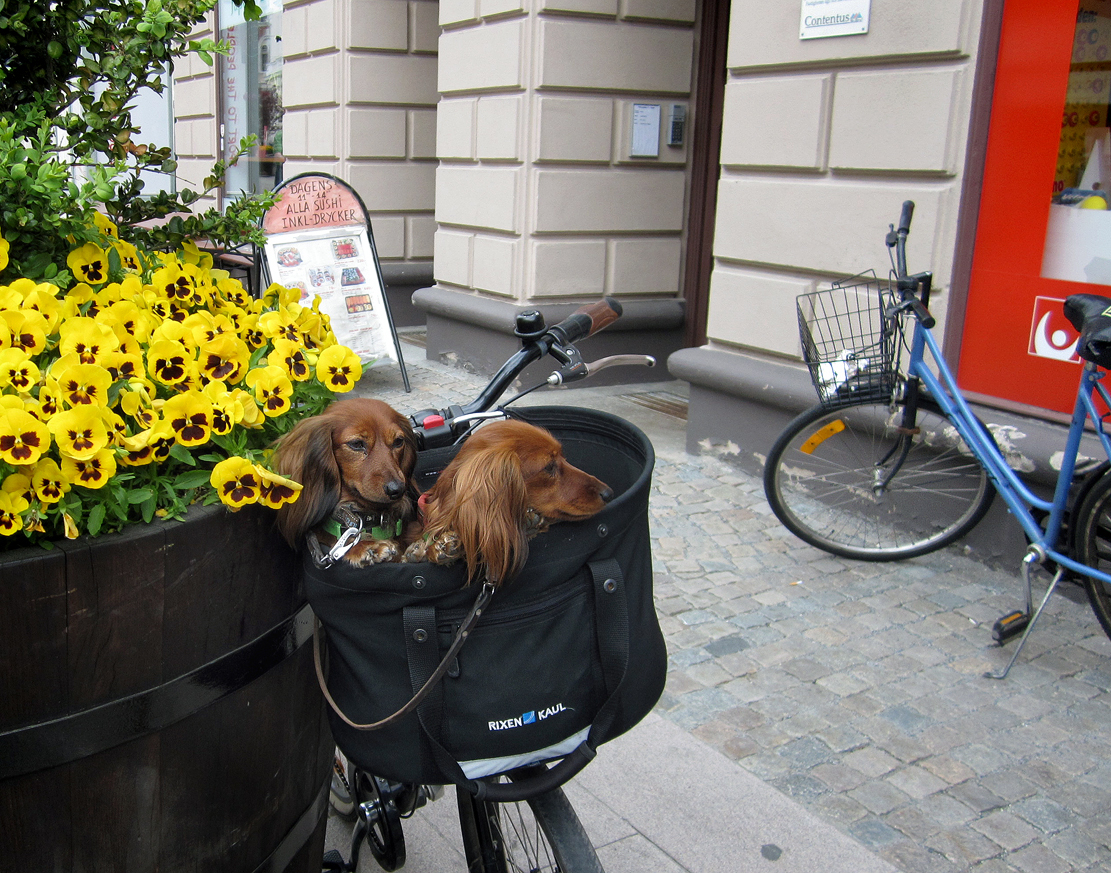
Bicycle basket in synthetic material, with carrying handle and zippered pocket. On the right in the picture, a simpler model in coated metal wire.

A bicycle basket is a bicycle-mounted basket for carrying cargo, usually light cargo. They are usually used for light shopping duties such as going on daily visits to the shops for fresh bread or milk. Baskets are often mounted on the handlebars and made of traditional basket weaving materials such as wicker and cane or even woven plastic that merely looks like wicker or cane. They can also be made of other materials such as metal mesh. Euroboxes (for example 40×30×25 cm) or milk crates are also used as bicycle baskets.

== Front baskets ==
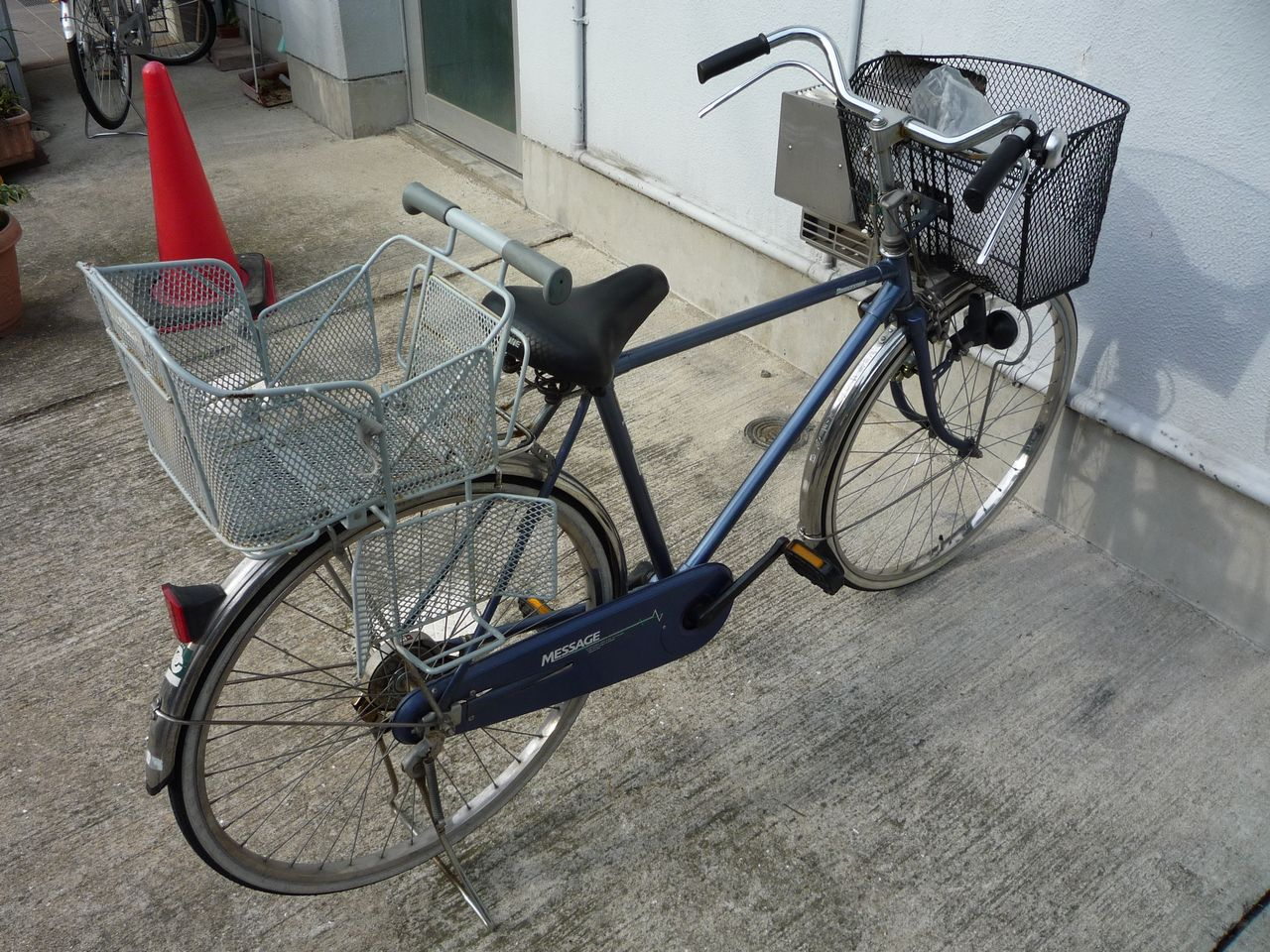
Bicycle with front and rear metal baskets.

Front baskets are usually mounted on the handlebars. Heavy loading will therefore affect how easy it is to turn the handlebar, and can be problematic for controllability. Some baskets are attached via braces that extend from the basket to the front wheel hub bolt or to tabs on the front fork of the bicycle, but these can have similar challenges turnability in case of heavy loading. Overloading a front basket can be problematic if not treated sensibly. Heavy loads can cause a high center of gravity which can throw off the handling of the bicycle as the load is attached to the handlebars and high up on the bicycle frame. Also any load that is far too large could possibly obstruct the rider's vision. Light shopping loads are usually not a problem.

Some front baskets are instead mounted via a carrier attached to the frame. This will impact the turnability less, but can still give a large inertia and high center of gravity and poor visibility in case of heavy loading.

== Rear baskets ==
Other types of baskets may be mounted on a luggage carrier near the rear wheel of the bicycle. These baskets are usually narrower and deeper than the average handlebar basket. Rear baskets function as a hard-sided pannier, carrying the cargo lower on the bicycle, which keeps the center of gravity low and thereby improves handling and control. This placement also cannot obstruct the forward vision of the rider.

== See also ==
- Bikepacking
- Outline of cycling
