= Systainer =

Modular plastic containers for transporting power tools

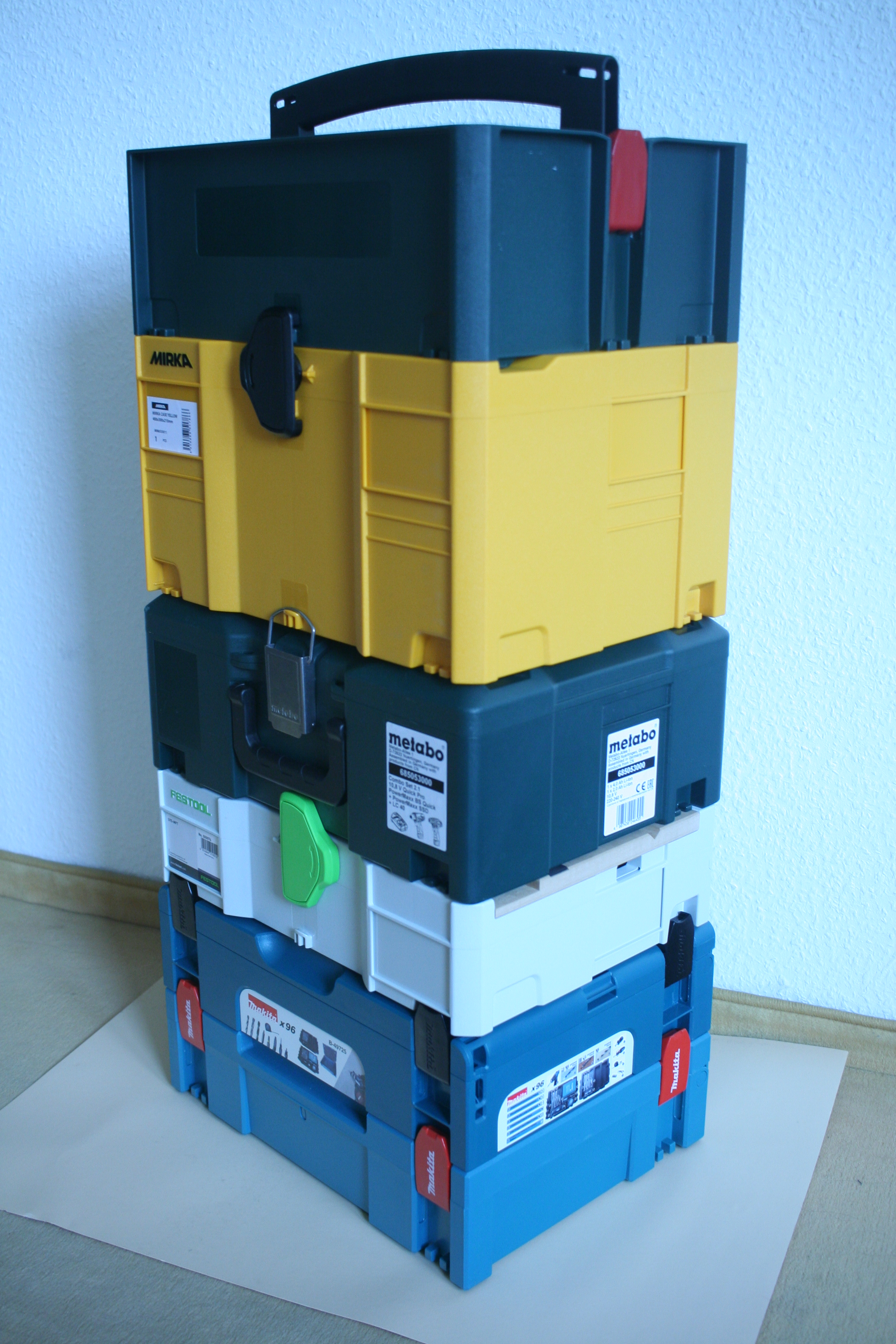
- Plastic nubs around the base of each container enable stacking and inter-locking from multiple manufacturers.
- Other names: Berner Bera Clic/+; Hitachi Hit-Case; Makita MakPac; Metabo Metabox/MetaLoc; Mafell Max/T-Max; Starmix Starbox; Systra Modul
- Classification: Modular stacking tool box
- Types: Classic; T-Loc; Tool Box; Systainer^{3}
- Used with: Power tools
- Inventor: Martin Topel (de); Herbert Pauser
- Manufacturer: Festo; Tanos
- Related: Euro container; Sortimo L-Boxx; Dewalt Tough System

Systainers (from sys-tem con-tainers) are modular inter-stacking plastic containers used for transporting power tools. Boxes from different manufacturers are compatible and can be stacked and clipped together. A design using four joining clips was introduced by Festool Tooltechnic in 1993. In 2010 the T-Loc variant was introduced using a rotating handle for connecting and locking of containers, in combination with redesigned feet.

To reduce plastic pollution, Festool designed the Systainer to first allow distribution of products, then be reused in stacking form as reusable packaging for tool transportation and storage.

Several power tool manufacturers use or offer Systainer-compatible variants. Other manufacturers use the alternative Sortimo L-BOXX design.

The term "Systainer" was trademarked in the United States in January 1994.

== Dimensions ==
Systainer height by type (without 7 mm feet)
| Type | Stacking height increment (mm) |
|---|---|
| I | 105.0(2 × 52.5 mm) |
| II | 157.5(3 × 52.5 mm) |
| III | 210.0(4 × 52.5 mm) |
| IV | 315.0(6 × 52.5 mm) |
| V | 420.0(8 × 52.5 mm) |
| Mini III | 142.0 |
| Mini I | 71.0 |
| Micro | 31.5 |

Systainer^{3} height by type (without 7 mm feet)
| Sys³ | Stacking height increment (mm) |
|---|---|
| 112 | 105.0(2 × 52.5 mm + 0 mm — "4 inch") |
| 137 | 130.0(2 × 50 mm + 30 mm — "5 inch") |
| 187 | 180.0(3 × 50 mm + 30 mm — "7 inch") |
| 237 | 230.0(4 × 50 mm + 30 mm — "9 inch") |
| 337 | 330.0(6 × 50 mm + 30 mm — "13 inch") |
| 437 | 430.0(8 × 50 mm + 30 mm — "17 inch") |

Systainer horizontal dimensions)
| Type | Nominal (mm) | Actual (mm) | Internal (mm) | Style | |
| Type | Nominal (mm) | Actual (mm) | Internal (mm) | Classic | T-Loc |
|---|---|---|---|---|---|
| Micro | | 105×65 | 100×60 | | Yes |
| Mini | | 265×171 | 254×154 | Yes | Yes |
| Normal | 400×300 | 396×296 | 382×267 | Yes | Yes |
| Midi | 500×300 | 496×296 | 483×267 | | Yes |
| Sys^{3} L | 510×300 | 508×296 | | | Yes |
| Maxi | 600×400 | 596×396 | 545×330 | Yes | |
| Sys^{3} XXL | 800×300 | 792×296 | 786×279 | | Yes |

== Variations ==
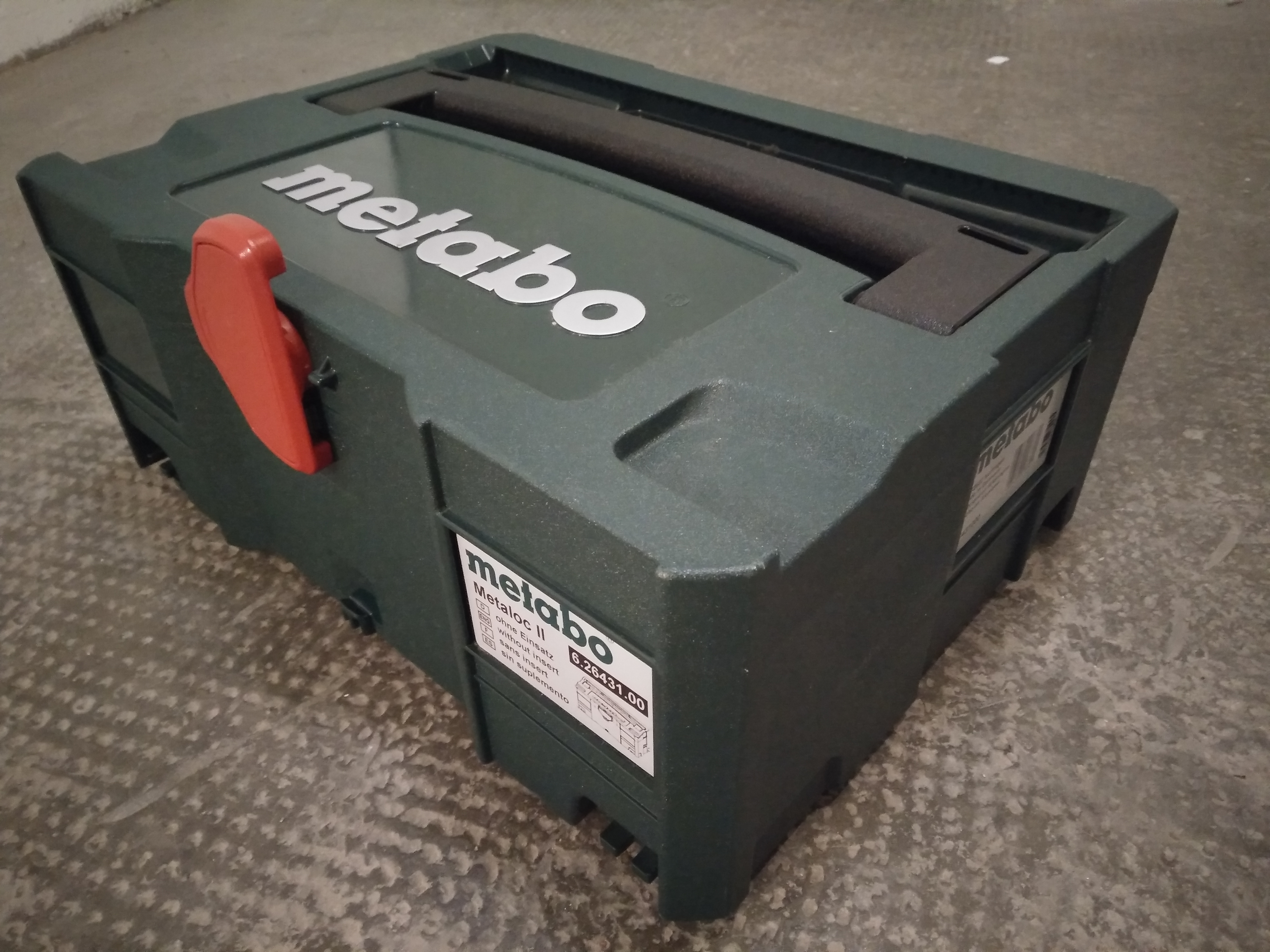
The T-Loc style uses a single rotating catch mechanism.

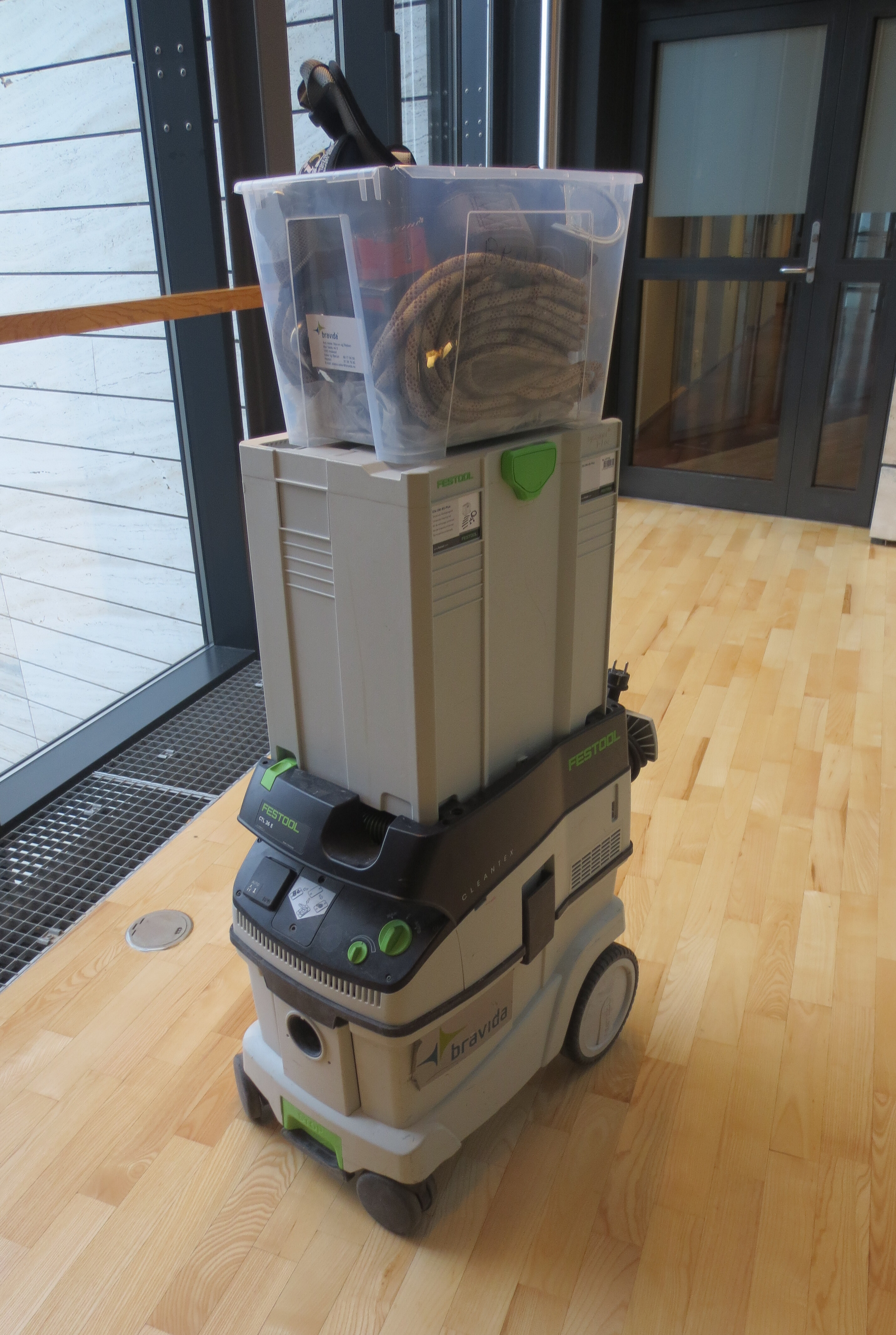
Festool dust extractor with attached systainer

In 2009, the design of Tanos' T-Loc stacking boxes was registered in the name of Timo Kuhls.

In 2011, the design of Makita's Makpac stacking boxes was registered in the names of Yuji Yamamoto and Kiyozumi Kokawa.

In 2014, the design of Tanos' cantilever toolbox was registered in the name of Timo Kuhls.

Beginning in 2014, the students at the Heinrich-Hübsch wood-working college in Karlsruhe started making wooden containers for each students' tools. The "Woodbox" design is 210 millimetres (8.3 in) high, with a transparent area for drill bits in the lid, and a T-Loc closing handle compatible with other systainer cases. In 2016 the teacher of the class, Peter Winklhofer, made the PDF plans available to enable other carpenters and students to build their own versions of the case.

In 2015, the design of Hitachi's micro-sized Hit-Case stacking boxes was registered in the name of Yi-Hung Lin.

In mid-2019, Systainer³ was announced jointly by Festool, Bott, and Tanos. These containers have integrated slide rail slots for direct connection to van racking, and front handles, along with backward compatibility.

=== Stacking order ===
Stacking order/compatibility of different types
| Upper Lower | Toolbox | T-Loc | Sys^{3} | Orga | Midi | XXL | Classic | Maxi | | |
| Toolbox | | | | Yes | | | | | | | |
| Systainer^{3} | | | | Yes | Yes | Yes | Yes | Yes | 1‒2 | | |
| T-Loc | | | | Yes | Yes | Yes | Yes | Yes | 1‒2 | | |
| Midi | | | | Yes | Yes | Yes | Yes | Yes | 1 | | |
| Sys^{3} XXL | | | | 1‒2 | 1‒2 | 1‒2 | 1‒2 | 1 | 1 | | |
| Classic | | | | Yes | Yes | Yes | | | | Yes | |
| Maxi | | | | ×2 | ×2 | ×2 | | | | ×2 | Yes |
