= Banana box =

Cardboard box designed to transport bananas

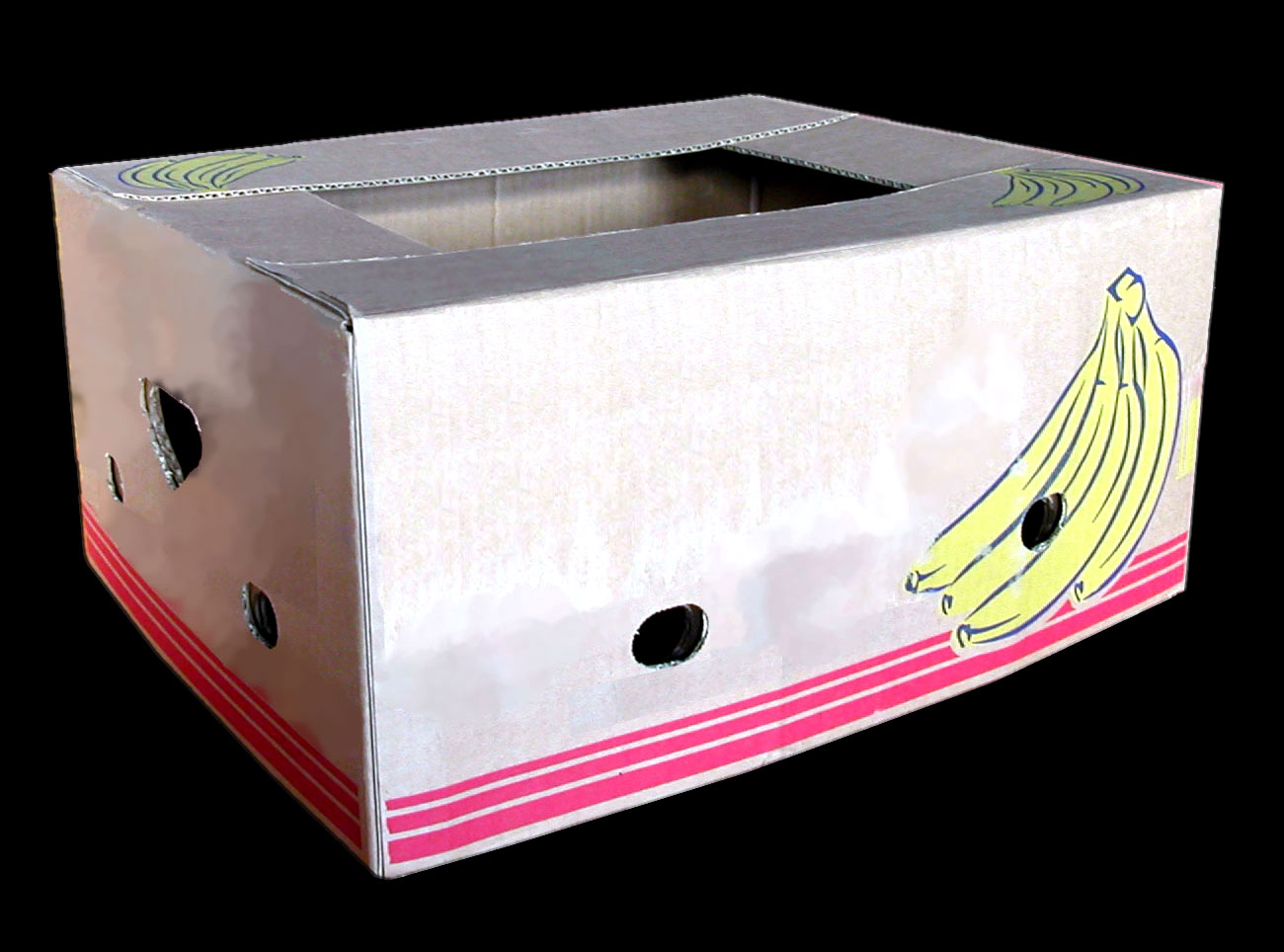
A banana box with the lid mounted

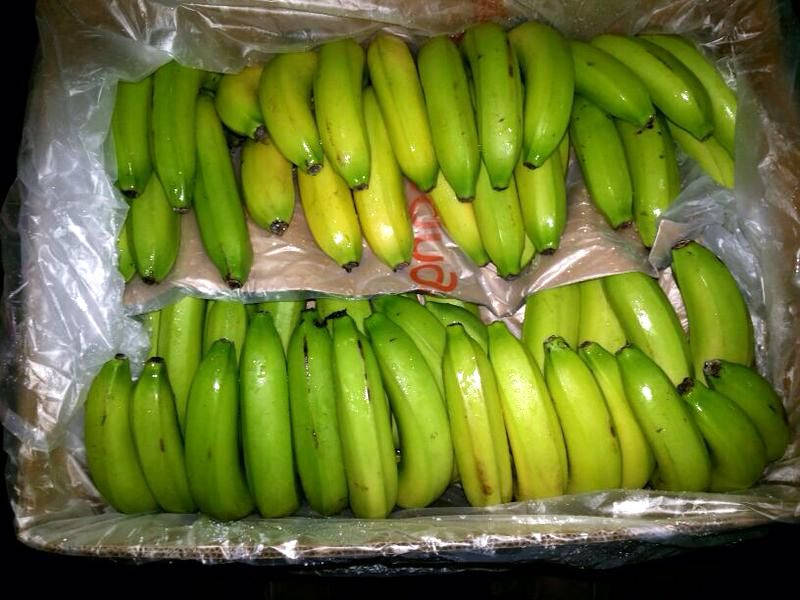
Bananas placed in a banana box for transport

A banana box is a type of corrugated box for transportation of bananas. It often consists of a separate lower part and a telescoping lid. Carrying handles and vent holes allow banana respiration and permit access to processing gasses such as ethylene oxide for ripening. The hole in the bottom is usually covered with a thin sheet of paperboard or corrugated board so that the bananas do not fall out, and a layer of plastic is usually placed between the bananas and the box.

== History ==
Until the 1950s, bananas were often shipped hanging from hooks in the cargo rooms of reefer ships, which could lead to the bananas being in a poor condition when they arrived at their destination.

Since the fruit is sensitive to pressure, 1961 saw the introduction of boxes packed at the plantations and loaded on refrigerated ships.

From the mid-1960s, refrigerated containers were increasingly used to transport banana boxes.

Dutch video showing banana harvesting in Suriname, April 1968. At 1:33 filling of banana boxes can be seen, as well as transport to the reefer ship.

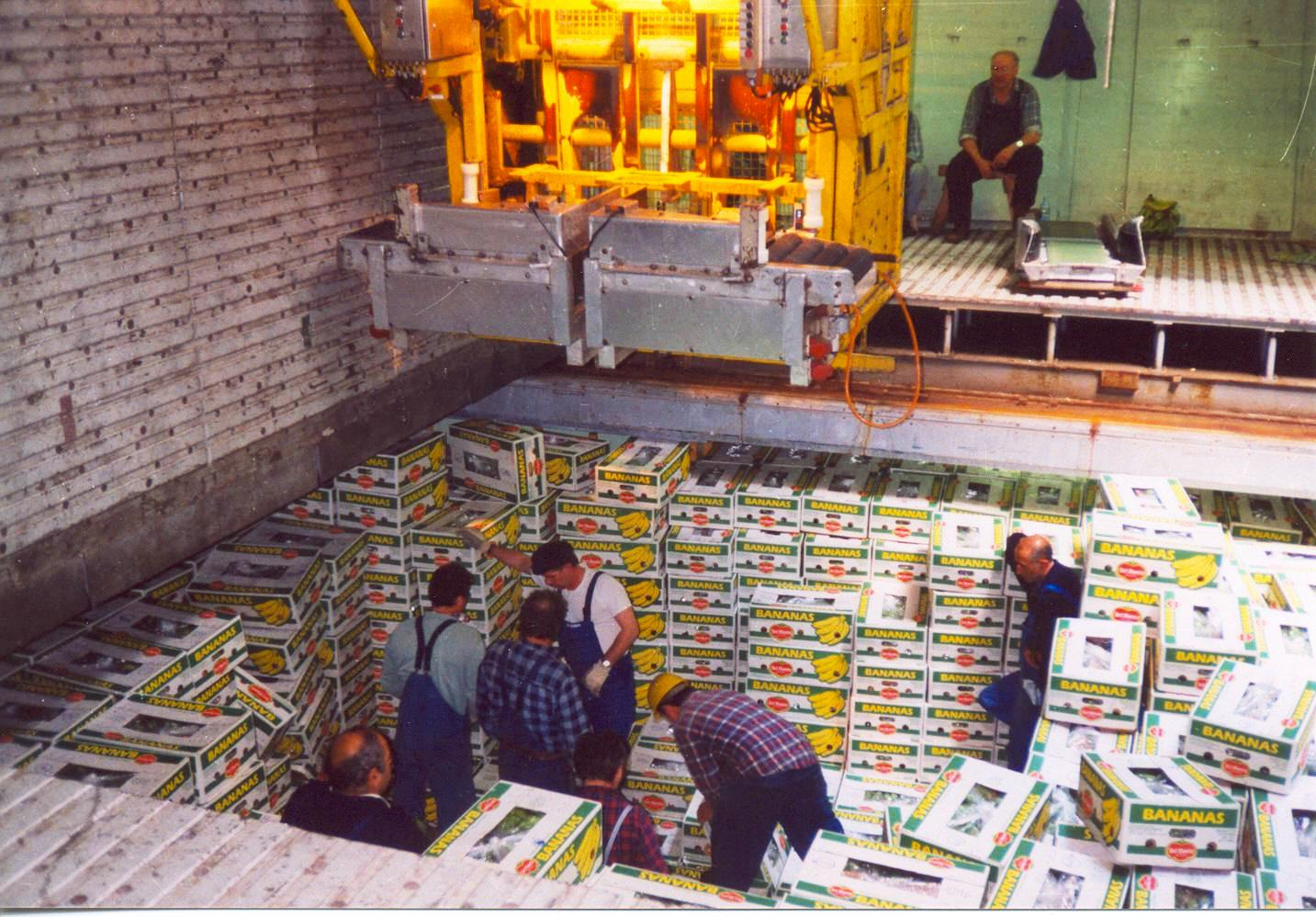
Loading of banana boxes in the hold of a refrigerated ship

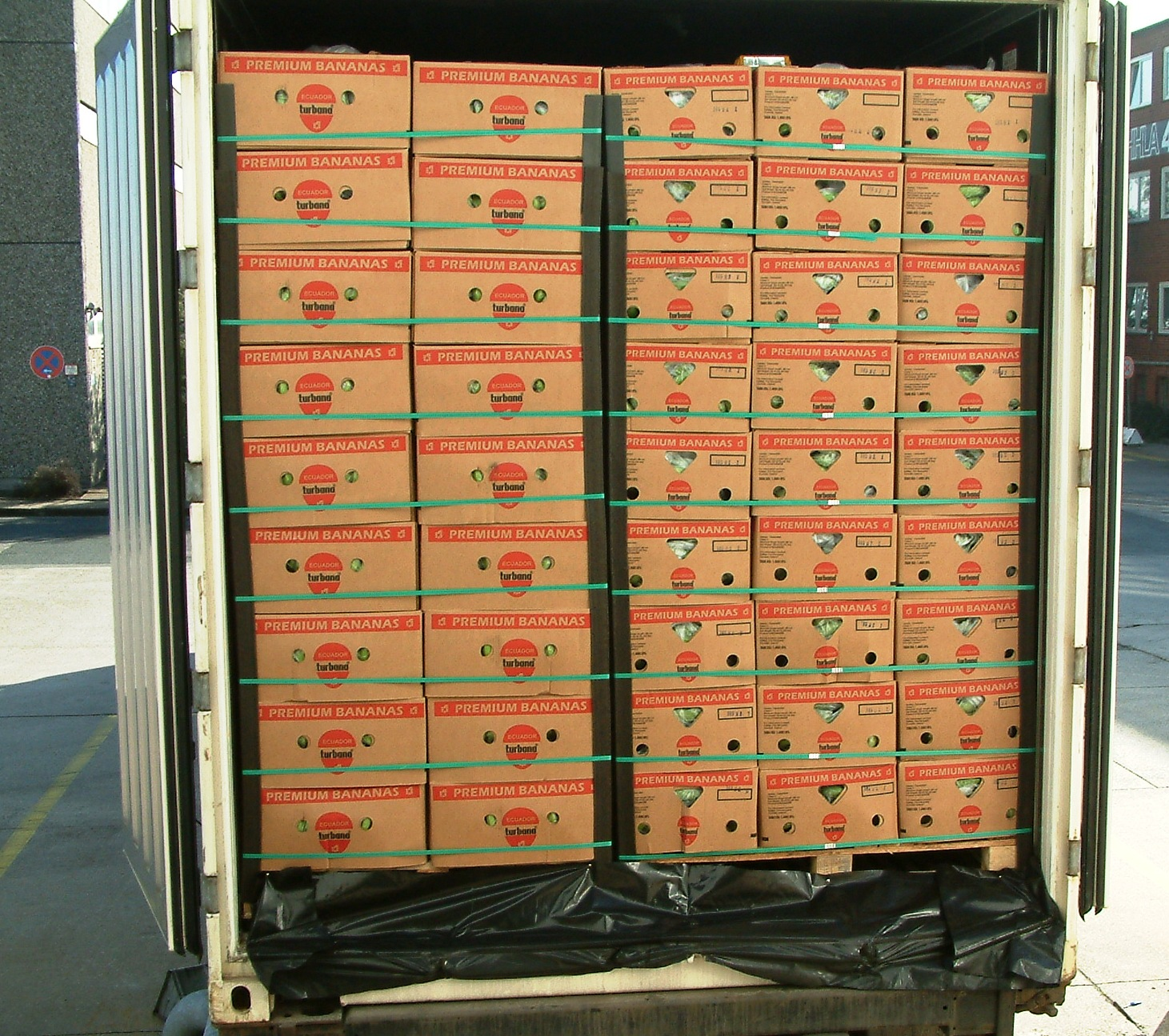
Transport of banana boxes in refrigerated containers at 13.5 °C (2006)

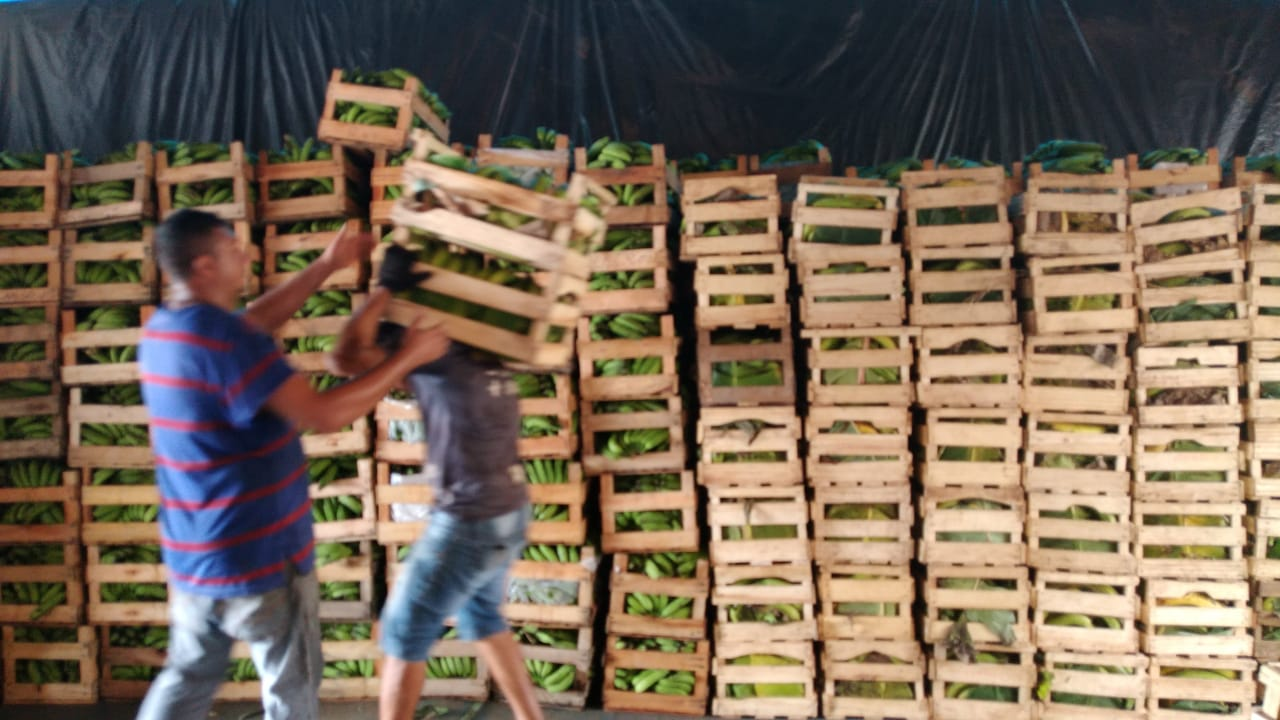
Shipment in wooden crates

== Dimensions ==
A banana box usually holds about 18 kg of bananas. The dimensions may vary slightly between different manufacturers, but are approximately 535 × 400 × 245 mm (width × depth × height), which corresponds to a volume of 52 liters (0.05 m^{3}). Thus, 20 banana boxes will fill about one cubic meter. A single type 1AA ISO container can thus hold 1200 banana boxes.

A disadvantage of banana boxes for transport purposes is that unlike euro containers, they cannot effectively fill a Euro pallet (1200 × 800 mm). Europallets can, for reference, also be stacked efficiently in a CEN container.

== Other uses ==
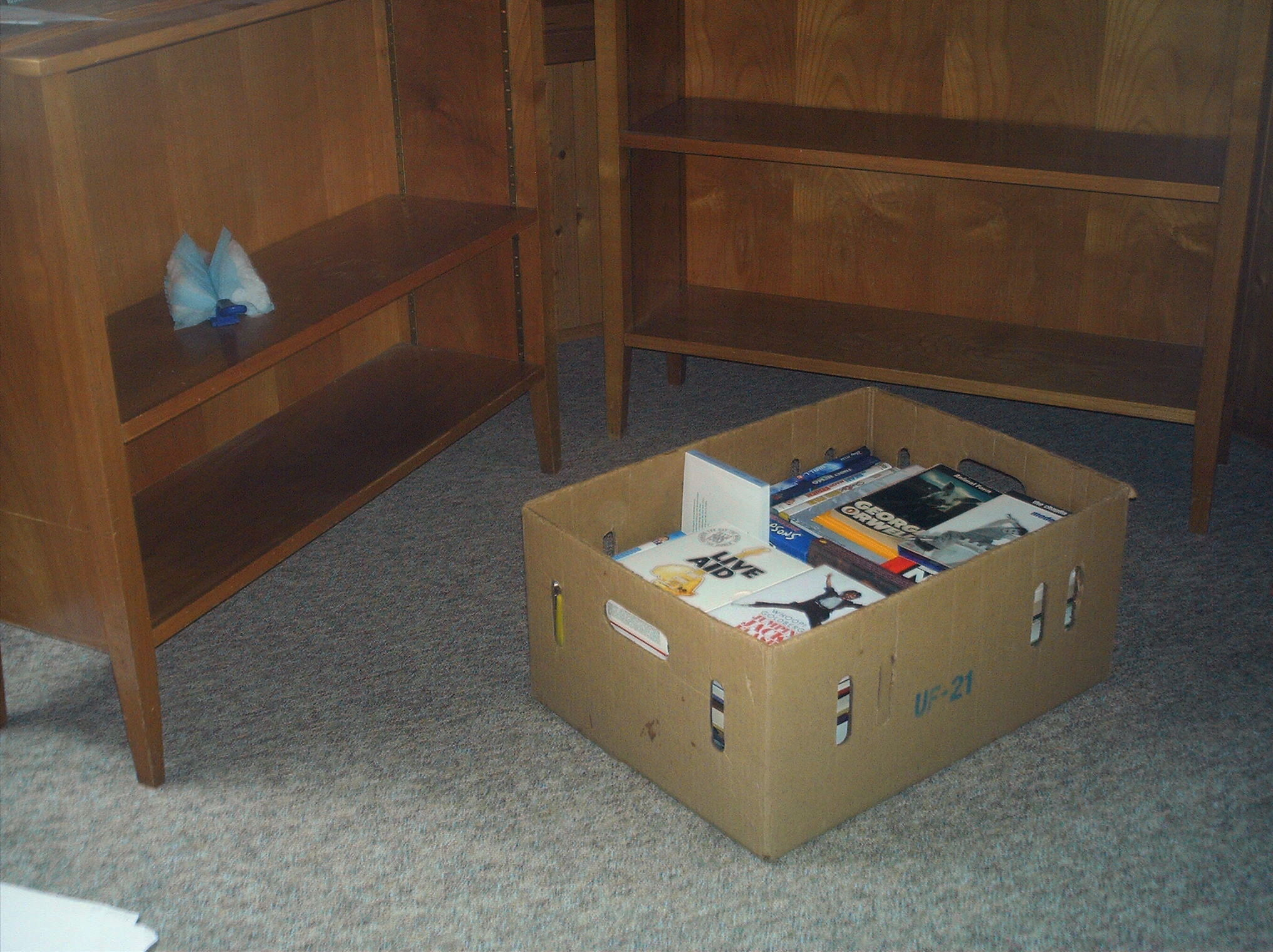
Video cassettes in a banana box

Banana boxes are popularly reused for storage or transport, for example as moving boxes, for archiving, used book markets, in storage areas or for humanitarian logistics. An important reason for these uses is that banana boxes usually are affordable and easy to obtain, as they are often given away for free from many grocery stores that otherwise would have to dispose of them. The boxes are relatively robust (for cardboard boxes), and their quasi-standardized shape makes them easy to stack. Some stores charge for banana boxes, and the profit may, for instance, go to charity. A disadvantage of using banana boxes for moving may be the size, and that the bottom may not be sufficiently durable. They can also start to smell due to juices that have settled from the bananas during transport.

== Investigations about toxic substances ==
There have been rumors that banana boxes may contain toxins that make them unsuitable for storing clothes and kitchen utensils. In 2004, the Swedish National Food Administration tested banana boxes, but found no toxins. In 2012, the Swedish Society for Nature Conservation could not give a definite answer, but considered that the risk of high toxin concentrations in the boxes was unlikely.

== Unwanted invertebrates ==
Some venomous spiders of the genus Phoneutria (Brazilian wandering spiders) occasionally wind up in Europe unintentionally with banana boxes via cargo ship. In 2018, the Swedish animal expert Jonas Wahlström stated that there were no very dangerous spiders in banana-producing countries. In the 2010s, however, deadly Brazilian spiders reportedly had been found in banana boxes in the UK and Germany.

Like with other paper-based products, there may be a risk of gray silverfish and silverfish with banana boxes.

== Possible replacements ==
In 2018, the Netherlands sought to replace corrugated banana boxes with plastic boxes which could be reused. The motivation for this was that it was more environmentally friendly.

In 2021, a new ventilated plastic banana box was launched by the company IFCO. It has a footprint of 600 × 400 mm (the same footprint as one of the most common sizes of euro containers). Furthermore, it has a height of 211 mm when unfolded, and is foldable to a total height of only 28 mm for more efficient transportation or storage when empty. ICFO claims this new type of banana box can contribute to a more circular economy.

== See also ==
- Euro container, reusable plastic boxes which are designed to fit on a Euro pallet
- Milk crate
