= Euro container =

Standardized industrial stacking container

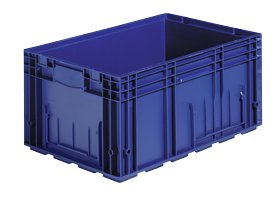
- R-KLT Euro 600 × 400 mm stackable container (tall version, 280 mm high)
- Other names: Kleinladungsträger (KLT)
- Classification: Inter-stacking reusable packaging
- Types: KLT; F-KLT (collapsible)
- Used with: Automotive manufacturing; Packaging; Distribution
- Related: EUR-pallet; Systainer

A Euro container, also called Eurobox, Euro crate or KLT box (from German: Kleinladungsträger, "small load carrier"), is an industrial stacking container conforming to the VDA 4500 standard. The standard was originally defined by the German Association of the Automotive Industry (VDA) for the automotive industry, but was subsequently adopted across many other areas of manufacturing and the shipping industry. The most common sizes (length × width) are 600 by 400 millimetres (24 in × 16 in) and 400 mm × 300 mm (16 in × 12 in), which can be stacked together to fill a Euro-pallet measuring 1,200 mm × 800 mm (47 in × 31 in).

== Dimensions ==
Container heights (without feet)
Type	Stacking height increment (mm)
Normal	132.5(147.5 mm overall)
High	265(280 mm overall)

Eurocontainers are based around two standard heights of 147.5 mm (5 3/4 in) and 280 mm (11 in), including a 15 mm (5/8 in) overlap in the vertical direction—the height of the feet, or base, stacked into the lip of the box below:

Measurements in millimetres
Nominal	Actual	Internal
300×200	297×198	243×162
400×300	396×297	346×265
600×400	594×396	544×364
800×600	800×600	752×552

These containers are manufactured typically in grey polypropylene or another thermoplast by injection molding.

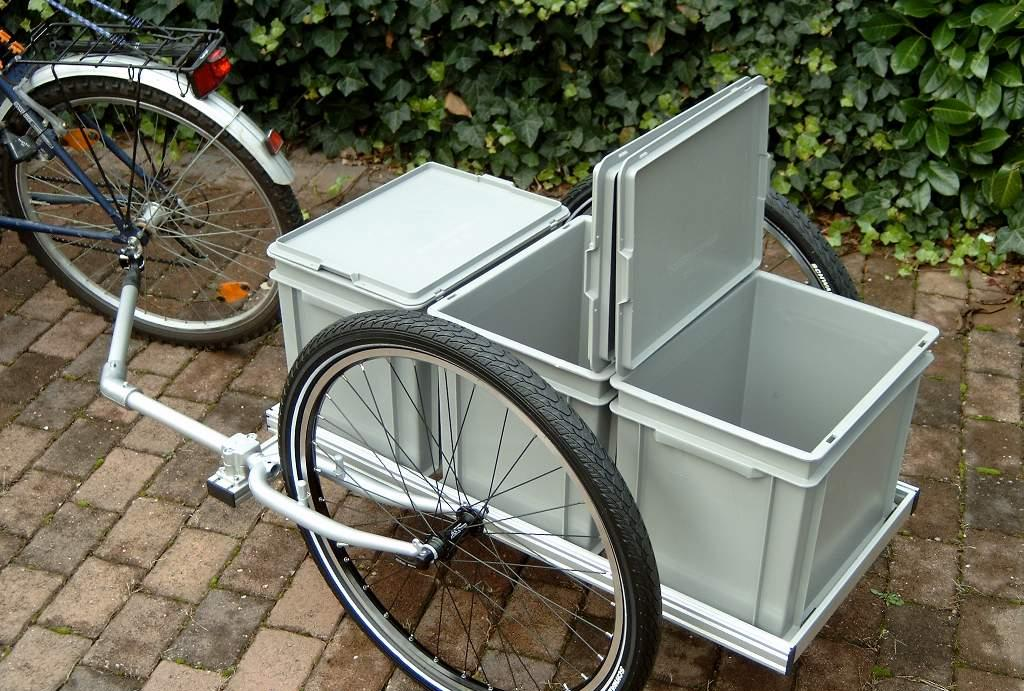
A bicycle trailer for bike-trekking with three Euroboxes and aluminium profile framing

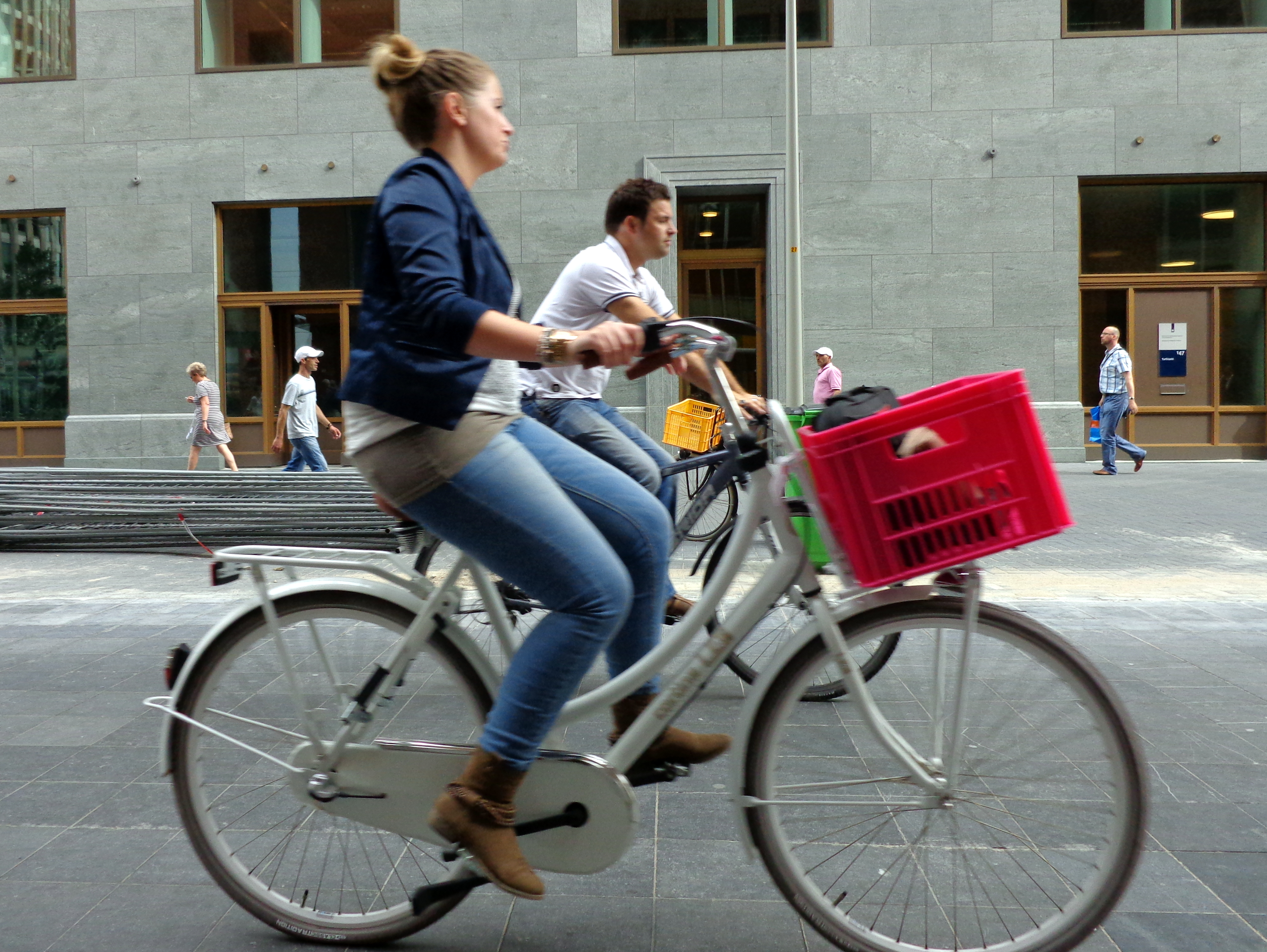
Woman on a utility bicycle with a red eurobox bicycle basket

Containers with full floor and walls are watertight. Many designs have at least two or more often four rectangular (about 12 x 4 cm) rounded grip-holes near the middle of the lips. The design may include some small holes in the lowest parts of at least two walls to let liquid run out if stored outdoors in rain or after washing. Walls constructed as grids allow one to see from the side into the box. If the bottom is formed by a grid, too, air may flow easily through even stacked boxes to keep bakery dry or allow quick cooling.

Euro-containers mounted on the rear rack of a bicycle or small motorcycle are widely used by newspaper-deliverers in Austrian towns. A Euro-container fits between the frame tubes in the low transportation bay of the Danish freight bike Bullitt.

=== Related standards ===
The 400×300-millimetre sizes and stacking height were adopted in the early 1990s for inter-stacking Systainer boxes.

== See also ==
- Cardboard box
  - Banana box, a type of cardboard box designed for transportation of bananas
- EUR-pallet, the standard European pallet
- Gastronorm, a European standard for sizes on containers for kitchen use
- Manual handling of loads
- Milk crate, a similarly-sized standardized container
- OpenStructures, open specification for modular interfaces in hardware based on a geometrical grid
- Preferred metric sizes
- Reusable packaging
- Reverse logistics
- 32 mm cabinetmaking system, a standard for shelving
