= Case (goods) =

Collection of items packaged together

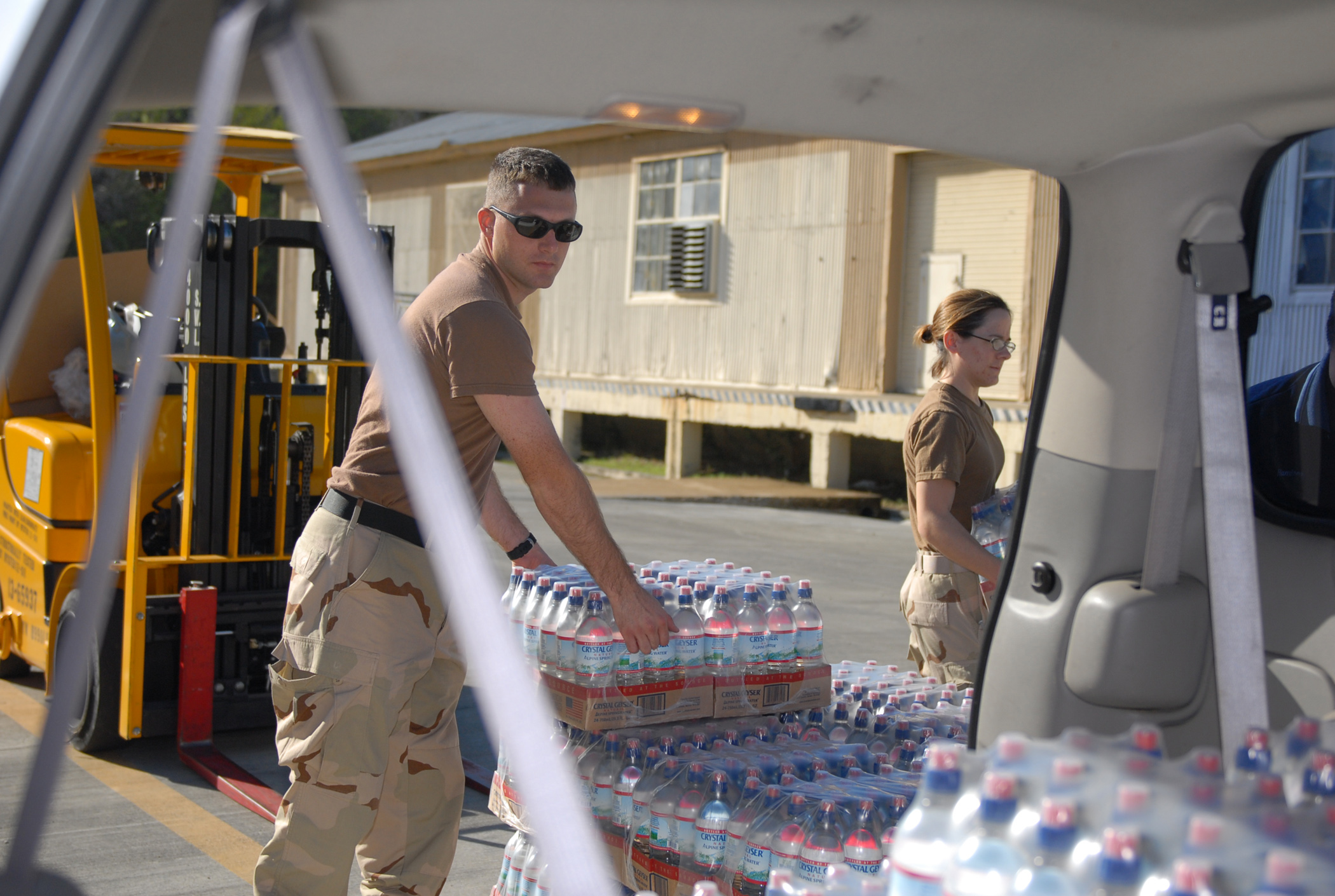
Guantanamo seamen load cases of bottled water.

A case of some merchandise is a collection of items packaged together. A case is not a strict unit of measure. For consumer foodstuff such as canned goods, soda, cereal, and such, a case is typically 24 items, however cases may consist of any quantity depending on manufacturer packaging - cases are typically found in multiples of four or six. For larger bottles such as gallon jugs, a case is typically four jugs.

== Examples ==
- The standard case for 32 ounces (910 g) bottles of soda and Powerade contains 15 bottles due to their peculiar shape and size.
- Cases of video tape are typically packed 10 to a case.
- A case of wine contains 12 bottles of 750 millilitres (26 imp fl oz; 25 US fl oz) each.

== Book manufacture ==
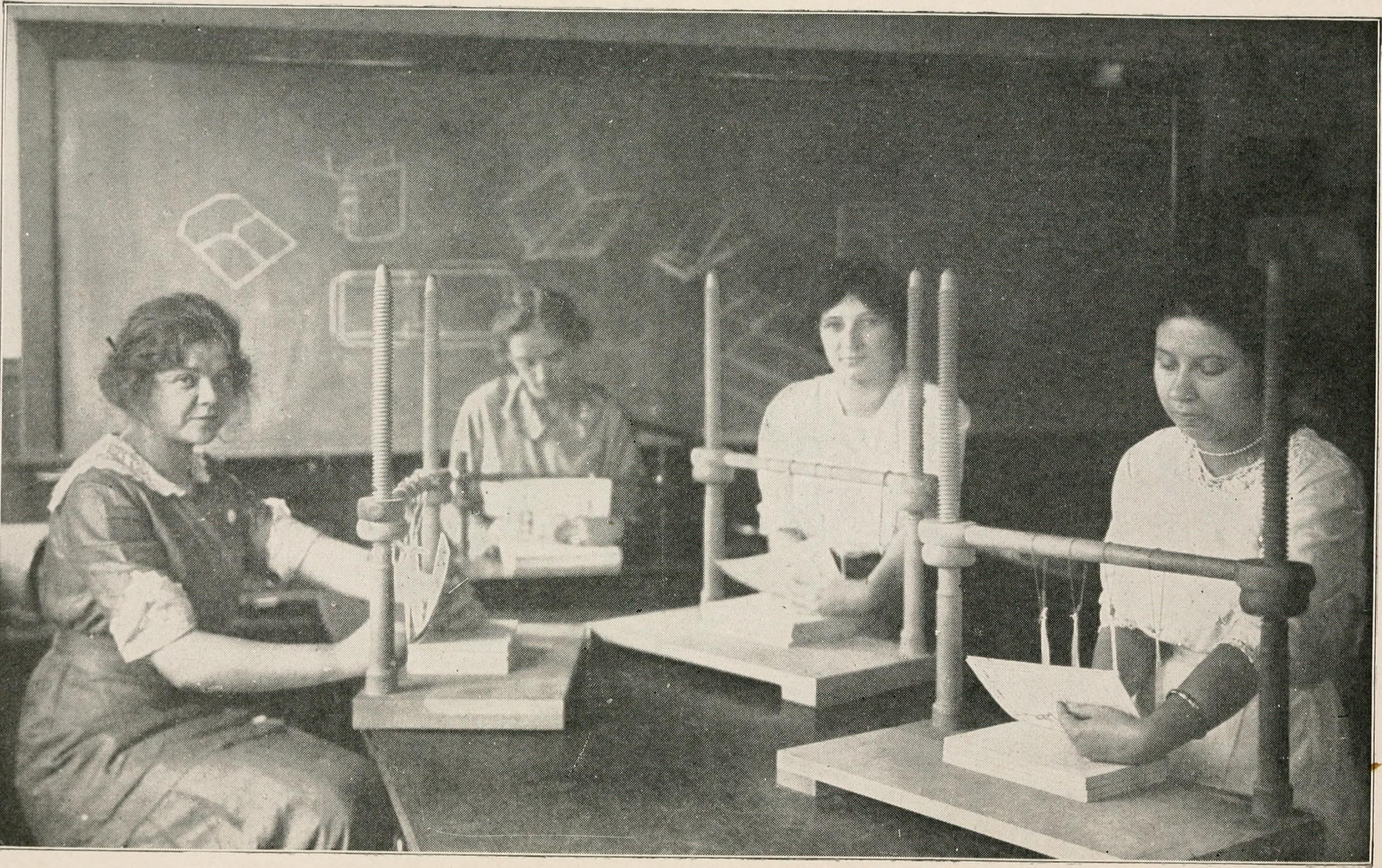
Illustration from Printing and Bookbinding for Schools (1914)

The term case binding in the book manufacturing industry refers to a collection of pages contained in a case which is attached to it. (There are also cases for books e.g. slipcases which merely enclose a book.) The original case is often now called simply the binding, although the integrated manufacturing process still uses the term case to refer to the hard cover and spine.

== See also ==
- Box
- Carton
- Crate
- Packaging
- Fast-moving consumer goods

== Sources ==
- Yam, K.L., "Encyclopedia of Packaging Technology", John Wiley & Sons, 2009, ISBN 978-0-470-08704-6
