= Bottle crate =

Beverage transport container

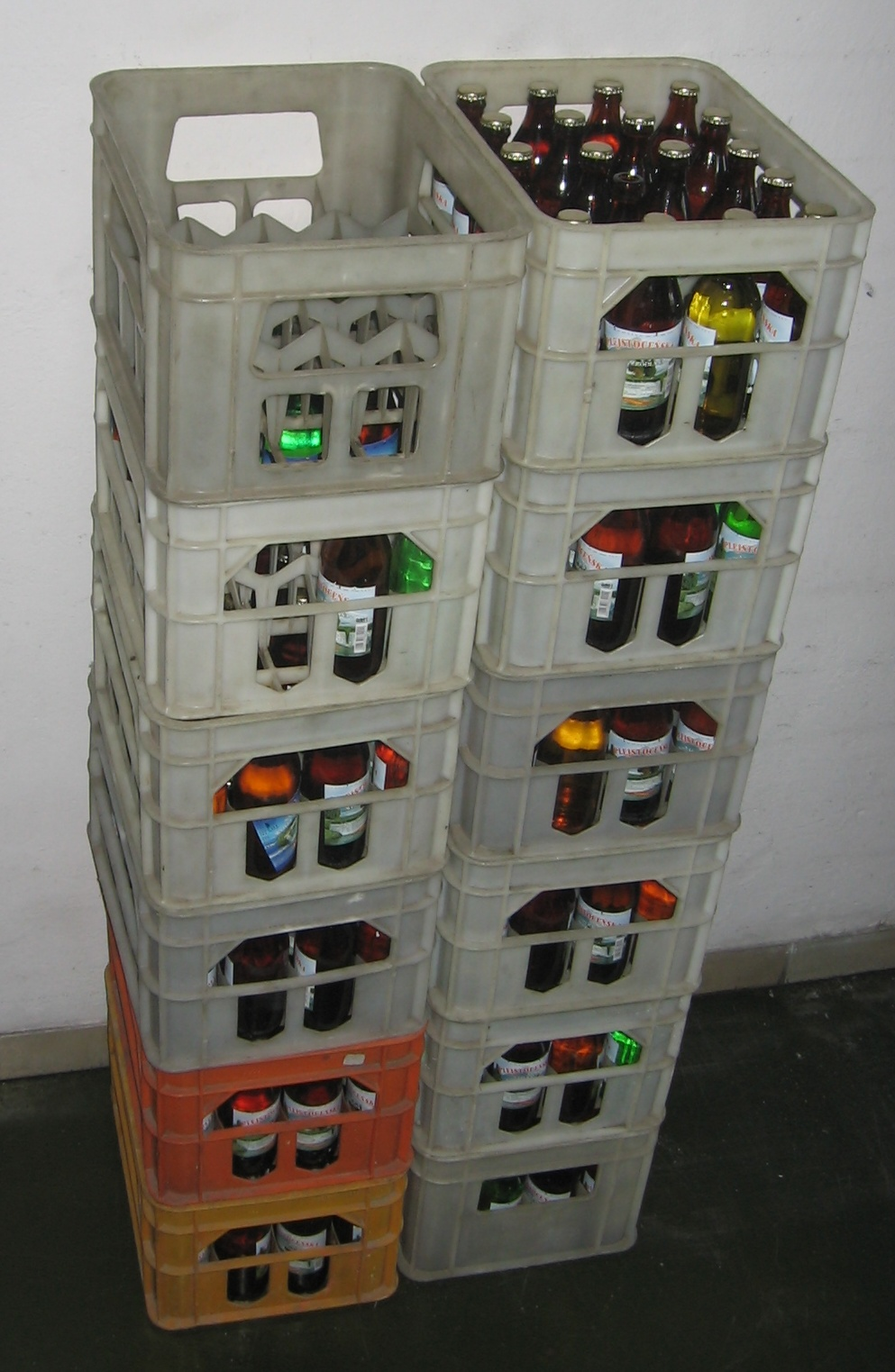
Reusable mineral water bottles in crates

A bottle crate or beverage crate is a container used for transport of beverage containers. In the present day they are usually made of plastic, but before the widespread use of plastic they tended to be made of wood or metal.

Beverage crates began to be made of High-density polyethylene (HDPE) in the 1950s.

Such crates can be long-lasting. In the 1980s in Sweden, a take-back campaign was organized, when 25-bottle crates were replaced by the more ergonomic 20-bottle crates. Some of the crates returned for recycling had been in use since the 1960s.

Because manufacturers avoid lead-based and cadmium-based pigmentations, in response to legislation and public opinion, they have had to resort to other methods of colouring HDPE crates. In Japan, since the early 1970s, HDPE bottle crates have been pigmented with a variety of perylene, quinacridone, azo condensation, and Isoindoline pigments. Japanese manufacturers have modified these in order to control nucleating behaviour, and have improved weathering performance and impact-resistance properties by making the light-stabilisization systems more efficient.

== See also ==
- Milk crate
- Reusable packaging
