= Milk crate =

Square or rectangular interlocking boxes

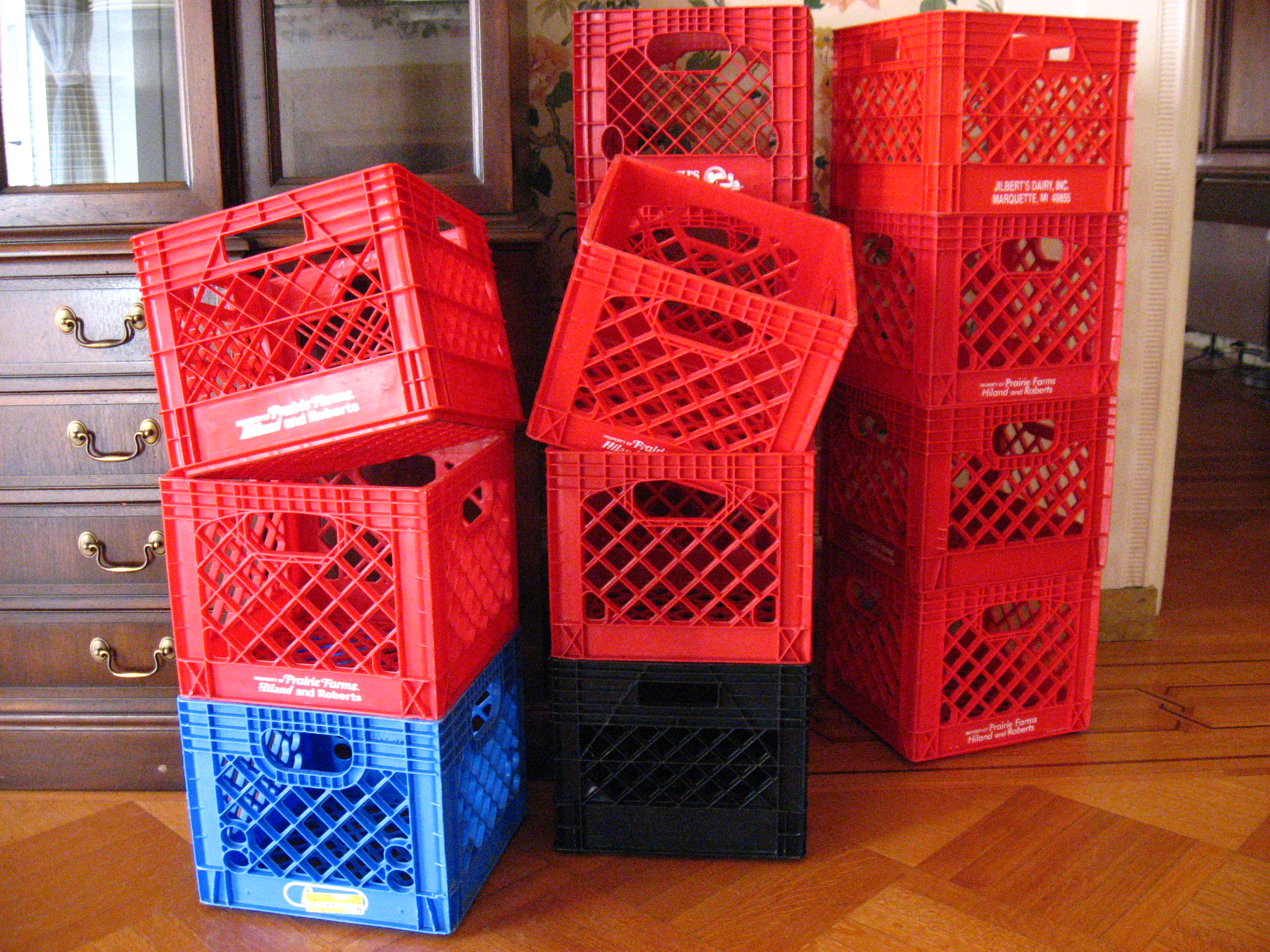
Milk crates

Milk crates are square or rectangular interlocking boxes that are used to transport milk and other products from dairies to retail establishments.

In English-speaking parts of Europe the term "bottle crate" is more common but in the United States the term "milk crate" is applied even when the transported beverage is not milk.

== History ==
The dimensions of the milk crate may have been influenced by the dimensions of the tea chest. For all practical purposes, both hold similar internal volumes, but tea chests are designed for shipping over the open ocean.

The bottle crate emerged after the tea chest was a de facto shipping method. The plastic milk crate is an Australian invention, produced through a period of trial and error in design by the Dairy Farmers Cooperative Milk Company in the 1950s and 60s.

== Inventor ==
Several Australian sources credit engineer Geoff Milton (born 1925) with designing the modern plastic milk crate used by the Dairy Farmers Co-operative Milk Company in New South Wales in the late 1950s.

Milton was employed as an engineer at Dairy Farmers when the company asked him to develop a new crate to replace the existing wire and wooden designs, which were prone to bending and breaking, damaging glass bottles and interrupting automated handling lines. He proposed an injection-moulded plastic crate that would be strong enough to withstand rough handling while still running smoothly on conveyors.

According to Milton, a 24-bottle plastic crate went into production for Dairy Farmers around the end of 1964 and, with only minor changes over the following two decades, became the standard milk bottle crate throughout Australia, including a distinctive maroon version used by Dairy Farmers. In later interviews he commented that the design “saved the [dairy] industry a tremendous amount of money” by reducing line stoppages and breakages.

Australian media have since described the plastic milk crate as an iconic local invention and referred to Milton as the "milk crate inventor" and "Crate Man", noting that his design has been widely adopted for both commercial use and informal re-use as furniture and storage.

== Design ==
Middle 20th century bottle crates were made of wood, later ones were stainless steel, and those made in the latter part of the century were of heavy-duty high-density polyethylene (HDPE).

The most common milk crate sizes are designed to carry several 1-US-gallon (3.8 L; 0.83 imp gal) milk jugs:

Number of jugs carried	Internal dimensions (in)	Internal dimensions (mm)
4	12 × 12	300 × 300
6	18.25 × 12	464 × 305

Some 12 in × 12 in (300 mm × 300 mm) milk crates have a height of 10 1/2 in (270 mm), but this may vary.

== Uses and recycling ==
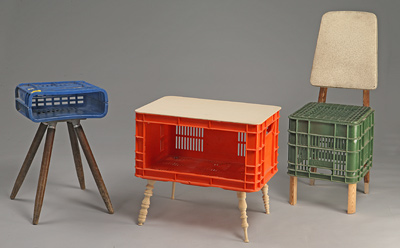
Furniture made from milk crates

Milk crates used as expedient stepping stones

Milk crates are often stolen for either personal or business use or for the plastic that they are made out of. Theft of milk crates can cost dairies millions of US dollars per year.

This has led at least one dairy farm to hire a private investigator to discover what is happening to the crates; the results of investigations point to plastic re-sellers being the culprits in the majority of thefts.

Starting around the 1970s, some plastic manufacturers began marketing milk crate types of storage containers to consumers for use in personal storage or decor. These products competed with higher-end proprietary modular plastic storage cube systems, such as the Finnish "Palaset" line marketed by Design Research; the consumer-grade storage crates varied widely in price, quality, and sturdiness compared to their commercial counterparts. The basic milk crate stackable design was often modified to also allow stacking with the openings facing sideways rather than upwards, thus creating a bookshelf-like set of storage compartments. Similar products remain on the market in the 21st century.

== Alternate shipping methods ==
In July 2008, Walmart and some other stores introduced a square milk jug that does not need to be transported in a crate. Sometimes called "green" milk jugs, they are not green in color, but rather are claimed to be environmentally friendly.

These new milk jugs are stackable up to a specified maximum height, and can be transported without crates. Companies need not buy plastic for shipping crates, or to transport or wash them.

== See also ==
- Banana box, a type of cardboard box designed for transportation of bananas
- Crate
- Euro container, a similarly-sized standardized container
- Milk crate challenge
- Reusable packaging
- Tea chest
