= Sortimo =

Sortimo International GmbH
- Company type: Ltd.
- Industry: In-vehicle equipment
- Founded: Germany, 1973
- Founder: Herbert Dischinger (died 2009)
- Headquarters: Zusmarshausen, Germany
- Key people: General management: Reinhold Braun, Klaus Emler
- Number of employees: 500 (2009)
- Website: https://www.mysortimo.com/

Sortimo is a German manufacturer of in-vehicle equipment, primarily van shelvings and plastic boxes and cases. Its name is an abbreviation of the German phrase sortiment mobil. ("mobile assortment") The company is headquartered in Zusmarshausen, Bavaria, and as of 2009 had approximately 500 employees.

== History ==
Sortimo International GmbH was founded by Herbert Dischinger in 1973 as a subsidiary of Sortimo Grundstücks and Beteiligungs-GmbH ("Property and Participation GmbH"). Dischinger developed a metal case for the safe transport of parts and tools, the dimensions of which soon became an industry standard. The dimensions of the company's products were designed for combined usage, with boxes fitting into cases and cases fitting into the in-vehicle equipment.

In its early years, the Sortimo subcontracted its manufacturing operations to other companies; however, in 1980, the company began its own manufacturing operations. The company's first manufacturing facility was located in Biburg near Diedorf. In 1992, multiple production sites were centralised at a new plant in Zusmarshausen, which continues to be the company's central manutfacturing site.

In 1990, the Sortimo the subsidiary was organized into its own separate company, Sortimo International Ausrüstungssysteme für Servicefahrzeuge GmbH. ("Equipment Systems for Service Vehicles GmbH") In 1994, it became the first company in its industry to receive the DIN EN ISO 9001 quality management certification. Its products are also TÜV certified.

The company added a new logistics center beginning in the spring of 2008., and, in 2018, the company built a 4000 car EV charging station on the A8 highway at Zusmarshausen between Stuttgart and Munich. At the time, this was the largest EV charging station in the world.

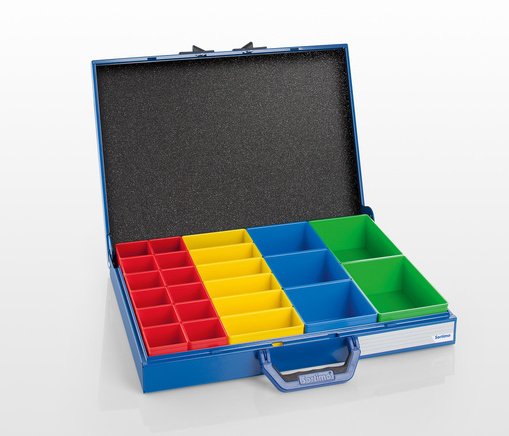
T-BOXX
