= EUR-pallet =

Standard European pallet

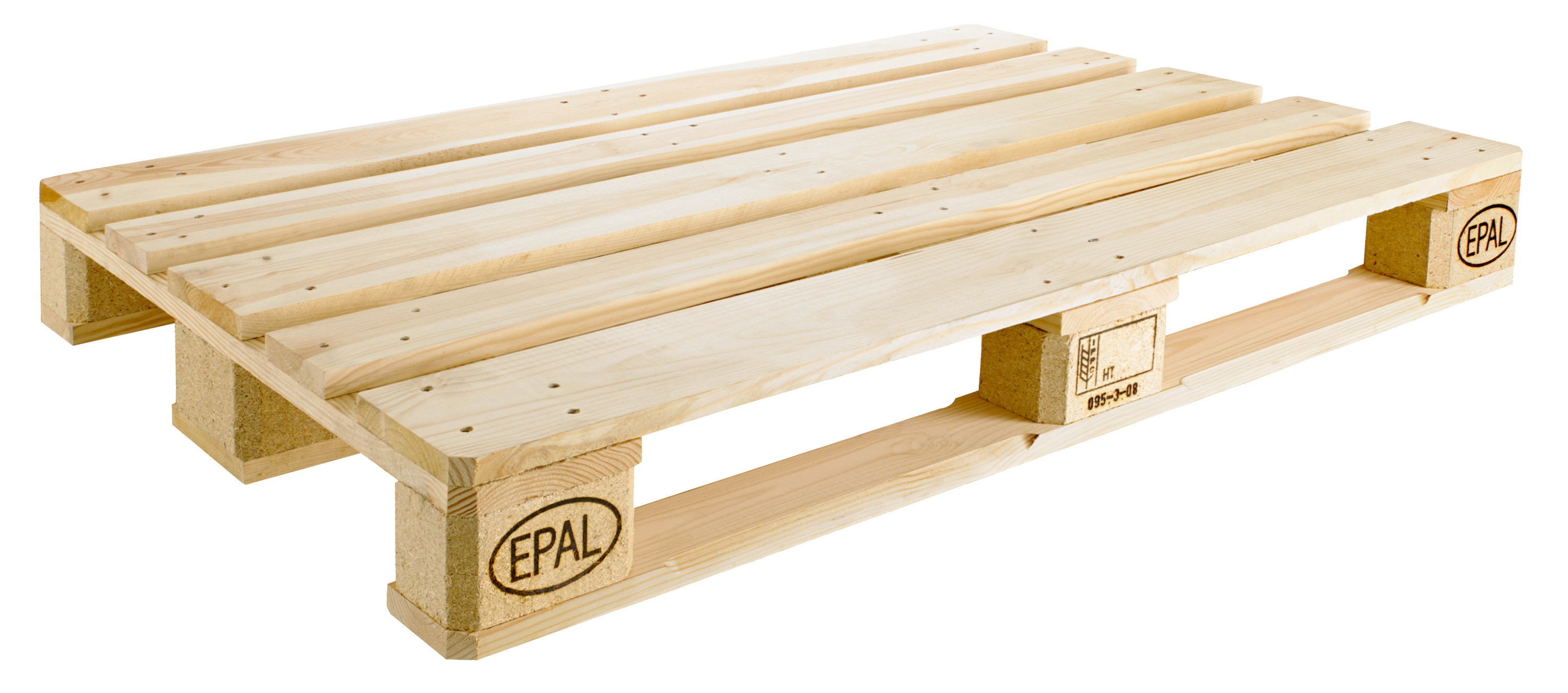
EUR-pallets

The EUR-pallet, also known as Euro-pallet or EPAL-pallet, is the standard European pallet as specified by the UIC pallet working group and the UIC 435-2 leaflet. Pallets conforming to the standardization are eligible for the European Pallet Pool (EPP), the system which allows for an exchange as "pallet for pallet".

The EUR/EPAL-pallet is 800 mm × 1,200 mm × 144 mm (31.5 in × 47.2 in × 5.7 in); it is a four-way pallet made of wood that is nailed with 78 special nails in a prescribed pattern. The weight of a EUR/EPAL-pallet (EPAL 1) is approximately 25 kg. Around 450-500 million EUR-pallets are in circulation. The safe working load of a EUR/EPAL-pallet is 1,500 kg. The maximum additional load can be up to 4,000 kg when stacking. The EUR/EPAL-pallet may weigh up to 1,500 kg (3,300 lb) when equally loaded, otherwise, the limit is 1,000 kg (2,200 lb).

== History ==
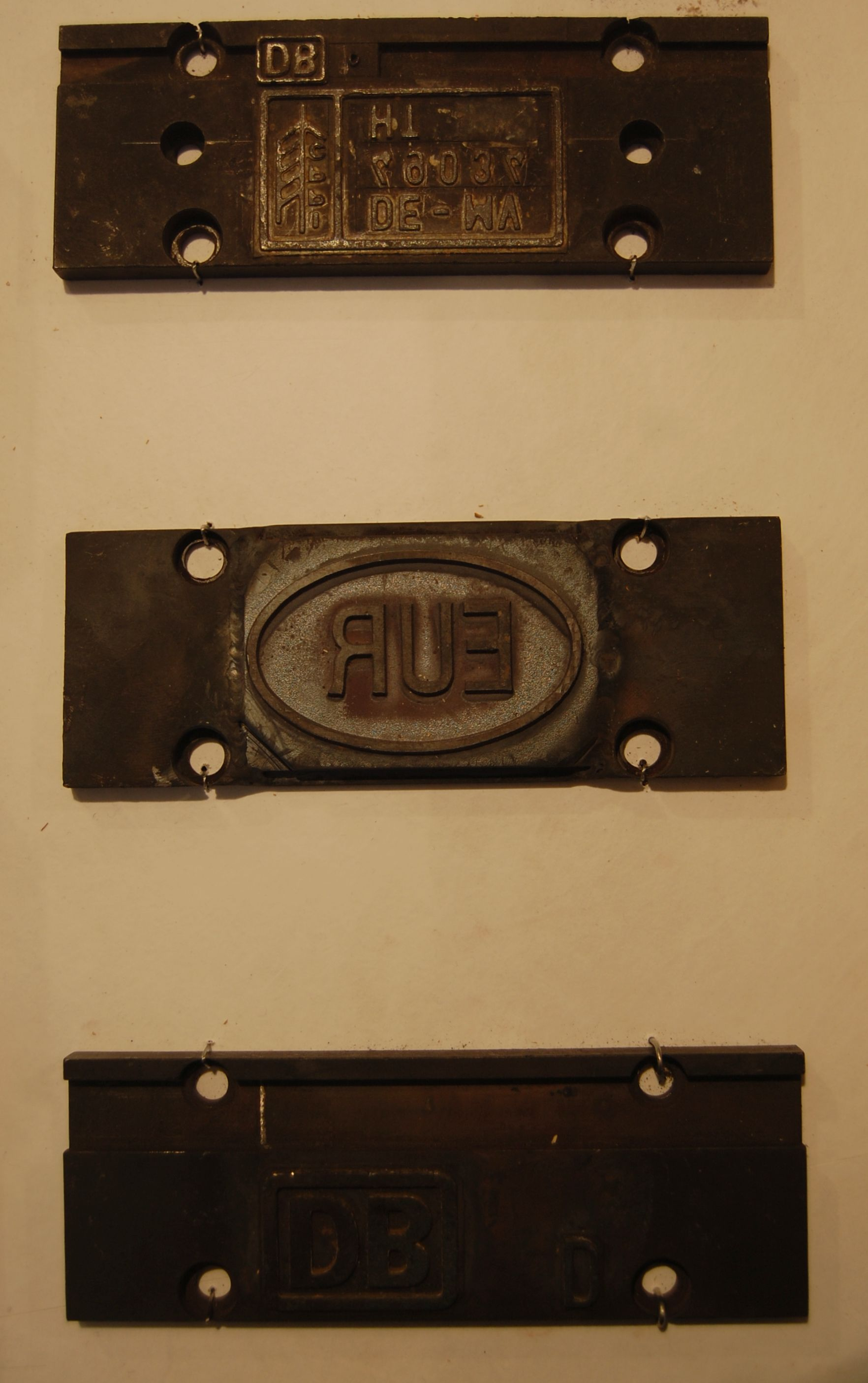
Branding irons for marking EUR-pallets, displayed at the Museum der Arbeit, Hamburg, Germany

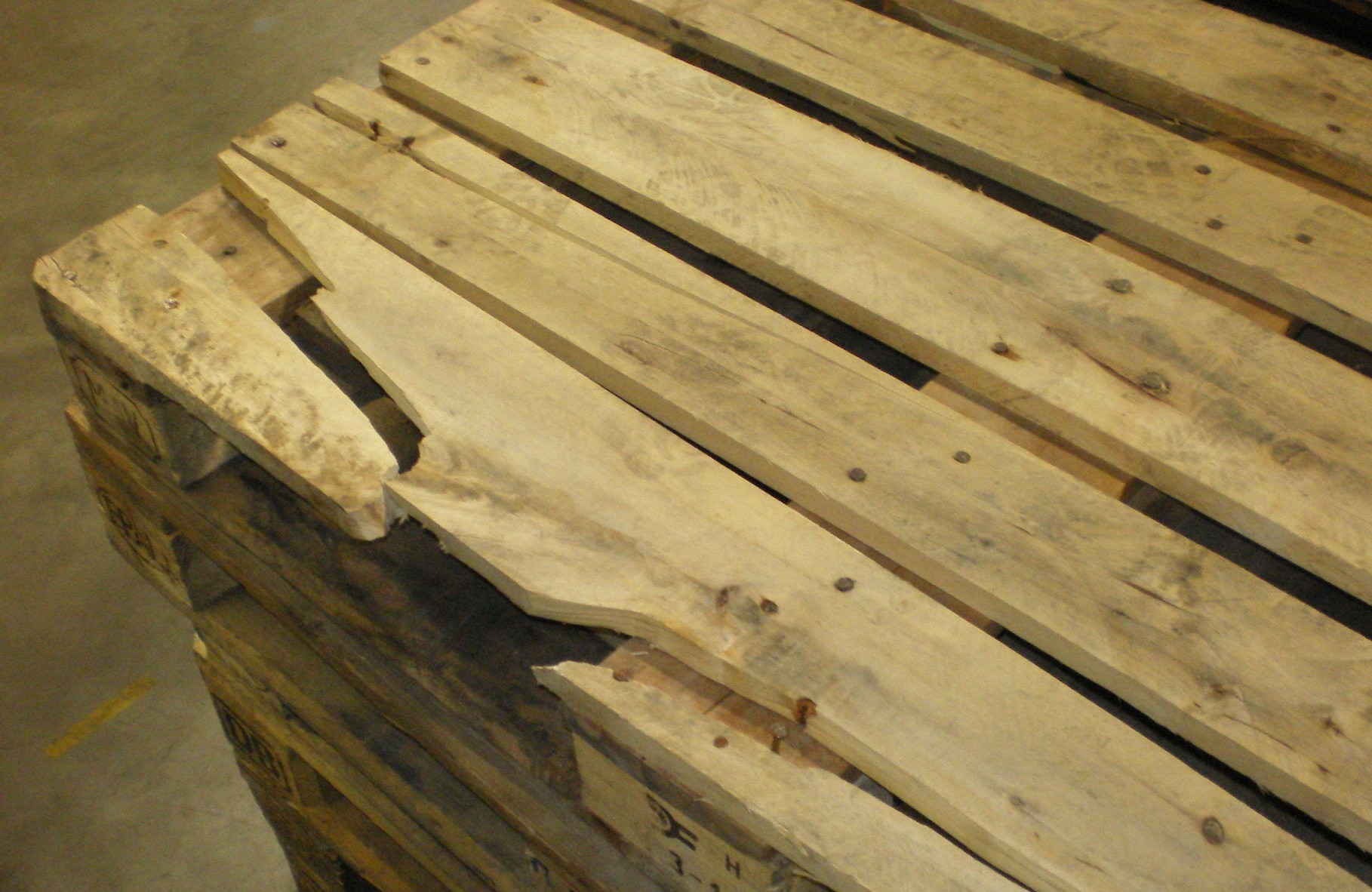
Broken pallets are not swappable - they must be repaired or removed from the pool

The Euro-pallet dates back to the wooden pallets used in railway transport. In 1961 the European railways commissioned the standardization of a common pallet type under the auspices of the UIC.

The inventors were the brothers Ivar and Tore Svensson of Gyllsjö, Skåne, Sweden. Using the Euro-pallet, it was possible to load railway carriages in just 10% of the time of earlier loading processes.

In 1968, the association also specified a standard lattice box along with a standard lattice box pallet. Following the standardization, most of the European industry switched over to using Euro-pallets with trucks, forklifts, and high-rack warehouses optimized for their size.

National associations developed framework agreements for pallet exchange in that freight would be delivered on Euro-pallets and the same number of Euro-pallets would be given in return ("pallet for pallet"). The Euro-pallets are controlled by the association, and the association takes care of repairing or removing old pallets from the pool. With the ongoing European integration, the European Pallet Pool allowed for pallet exchange even in cross-border dealings.

With the success of the Euro-pallets, a number of replicas entered the market that used low-quality wood which splintered easily and were prone to mold, so the European railways, which own the trademarks for EUR/EPAL, created a separate standardization body. EPAL, the European Pallet Association e.V., was founded in 1991, and the EUR and EPAL logo may only be used by licensees of that organization.

EPAL assumed responsibility for the safety and quality of all pooled pallets in 2016. Globalization has made for a decline of the EUR/EPAL system since the EUR-pallets do not fit well into ISO containers. It is still the most widespread pallet type in the world, with an estimate of 350 to 500 million EUR-pallets being in circulation. One of the advantages is that the 800 mm (31 in) width fits through normal doors (the most common DIN door type is 850 by 2,000 mm [33 by 79 in]).

Derivatives of the EUR-pallet have been developed for specific uses. The EUR-pallet—also EUR-1-pallet—was followed by the EUR-2-pallet and EUR-3-pallet, which are both 1,200 mm × 1,000 mm (47 in × 39 in), which is close to the standard American pallet type of 40 in × 48 in (1,016 mm × 1,219 mm). For use in retail stores, the EUR-6-pallet is half the size of the EUR-pallet, 600 mm × 800 mm (24 in × 31 in). ISO standards have also been published for these Euro-pallet types.

To accommodate EUR-pallets, there are derivative intermodal containers that are about 2 in (5 cm) wider—these are commonly known as "pallet-wide" containers. These containers feature an internal width of 2,440 mm (96 in) for easy loading of two 1,200 mm (47 in) long pallets side by side—many sea shipping providers in Europe allow these, as overhangs on standard containers are sufficient to fit them in the usual interlock spaces.

The 45 ft (14 m) pallet-wide high-cube shortsea container has gained wide acceptance, as these containers can replace the A-Behälter swap bodies with a length of 13,670 mm (44 ft 10 in) that are common for truck transport in Europe. The EU has started a standardization for pallet-wide containerization in the EILU (European Intermodal Loading Unit) initiative.

== Specification ==
EUR-pallet specification

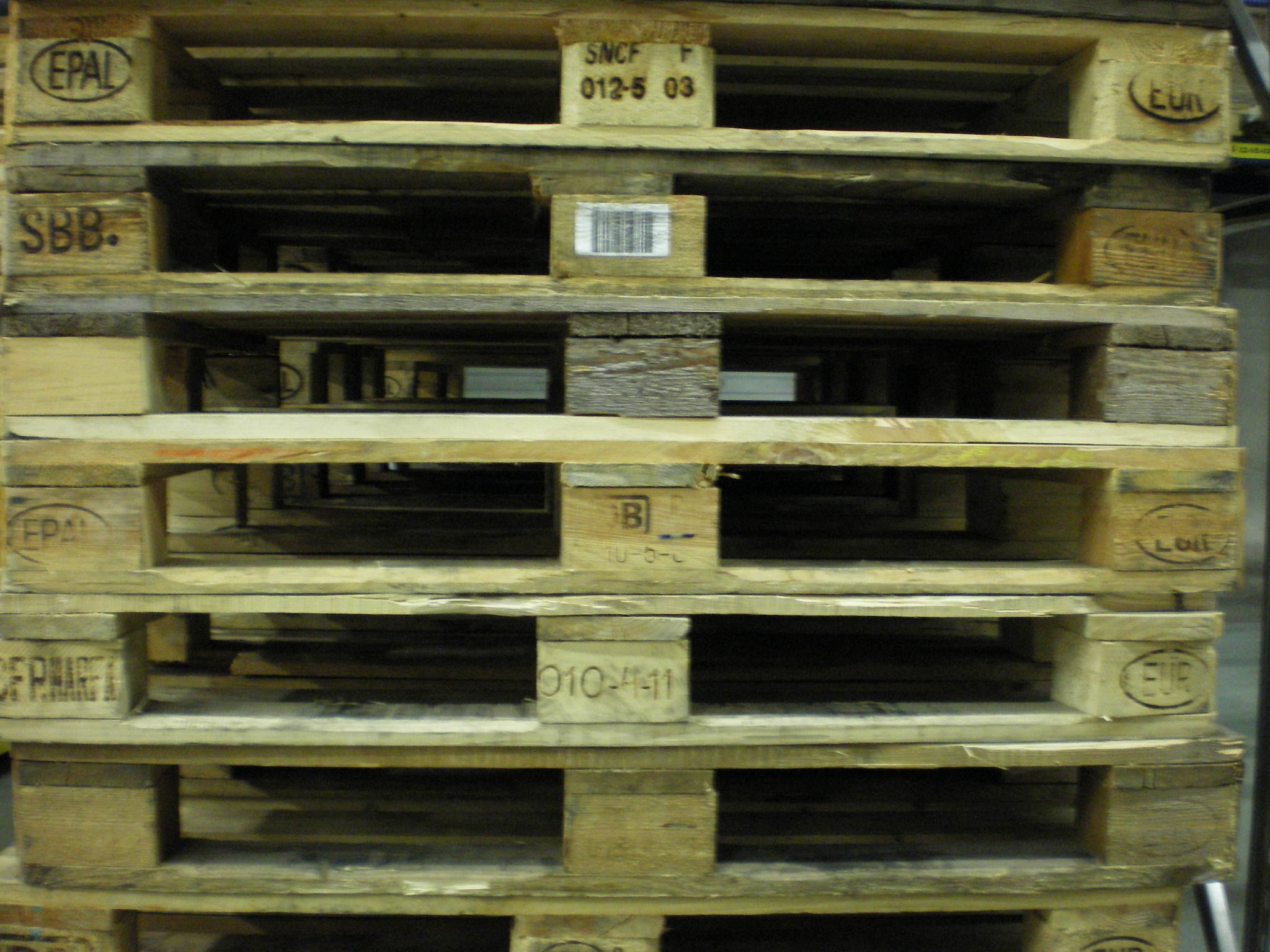
A stack of counterfeit EUR-pallets

The EUR-pallet's dimensions are defined in the following standards:

- UIC 435-2 Standard of quality for EUR flat pallets made of wood measuring 800 mm x 1200 mm (EUR-1)
- ISO 445 Pallets for materials handling - Vocabulary (ISO 445:2008)
- ISO 3676 Packaging—Unit Load Sizes—Dimensions
- ISO 3394 Dimensions of Rigid Rectangular Packages, Transport Packages.
- ISO 8611-1 Pallets for materials handling
  - ISO 8611-1 Pallets for materials handling—Flat pallets—Part 1: Test methods
  - ISO 8611-2 Pallets for materials handling—Flat pallets—Part 2: Performance requirements and selection of tests
- ISO 12776 Pallets—Slip sheets
- ISO 12777-1 Methods of test for pallet joints
  - ISO 12777-1 Methods of test for pallet joints—Part 1: Determination of bending resistance of pallet nails, other dowel-type fasteners and staples
  - ISO 12777-2 Methods of test for pallet joints—Part 2: Determination of withdrawal and head pull-through resistance of pallet nails and staples
  - ISO 12777-3 Methods of test for pallet joints - Part 3: Determination of strength of pallet joints
- ISO 15629 Pallets for materials handling—Quality of fasteners for assembly of new and repair of used, flat, wooden pallets
- ISO 18334 Pallets for materials handling—Quality of assembly of new wooden pallets
- ISO 18613 Repair of flat wooden pallets
- EN 13626 Packaging - Box pallets - General requirements and test methods
- EN 13382 Flat pallets for materials handling - Principal dimensions
- EN 13698-1 Pallet production specification
  - EN 13698-1 Pallet production specification—Part 1: Construction specification for 800 mm × 1,200 mm (31 in × 47 in) flat wooden pallets
  - EN 13698-2 Pallet production specification—Part 2: Construction specification for 1,000 mm × 1,200 mm (39 in × 47 in) flat wooden pallets
- EN 15512 Steel static storage systems—Adjustable pallet racking systems - Principles for structural design
- EN 15620 Steel static storage systems—Adjustable pallet racking - Tolerances, deformations and clearances

=== Materials and identification ===
The EUR-pallet must use at least 78 nails of a specific type that are subject to a prescribed nailing pattern. The final pallet weighs 20 to 25 kg (44 to 55 lb). Only dry wood may be used, to reduce the risk of mold.

Each EUR-pallet bears a number of quality marks:

- On the left corner leg, the EPAL logo is shown. Originally this was used for the railway company designation that was eligible to control the Euro-pallet production. Since the control was moved to the EPAL, many framework agreements require the EPAL logo.
- On the central leg, the code of the producer company is shown along with the signature of the verifier and the name of the railway company that installed the verifier. If the EUR-pallet has been repaired already, then a round verification nail is put in the central chunk. The last numbers designate the production year and possibly the type of wood.
- On the right corner leg, the EUR logo is shown. The EPAL and EUR logos are encircled in an oval that resembles the nationality sticker for cars.

With the EPAL QUALITY CLASSIFICATION, the standardizing body created 3 classes for used pallets to have a standard to swap pallets more equally/fairly.

=== Common types ===
The four common sizes of EUR-pallets (alongside ISO alternative sizes) are:

EUR-pallet type	Dimensions (L × W)		ISO pallet alternative
EUR or EUR 1	800 mm × 1,200 mm	31.50 in × 47.24 in	ISO1, same size as EUR
EUR 2	1,200 mm × 1,000 mm	47.24 in × 39.37 in	ISO2
EUR 3	1,000 mm × 1,200 mm	39.37 in × 47.24 in	
EUR 6	800 mm × 600 mm	31.50 in × 23.62 in	ISO0, half the size of EUR

== See also ==
- Euro container, various sizes of stacking containers which can be stacked together to fill a Euro-pallet
