= Band =

Band or BAND may refer to:

== Places ==
- Bánd, a village in Hungary
- Band, Iran, a village in Urmia County, West Azerbaijan Province, Iran
- Band, Mureș, a commune in Romania
- Band-e Majid Khan, a village in Bukan County, West Azerbaijan Province, Iran

== Arts, entertainment, and media ==
=== Music ===
- Musical ensemble, a group of people who perform instrumental or vocal music
  - Band (rock and pop), a small ensemble that plays rock or pop
  - Concert band, an ensemble of woodwind, brass, and percussion instruments
  - Dansband, band playing popular music for a partner-dancing audience
  - Jazz band, a musical ensemble that plays jazz music
  - Marching band, a group of instrumental musicians who generally perform outdoors
  - School band, a group of student musicians who rehearse and perform instrumental music
- The Band, a Canadian-American rock and roll group
  - The Band (album), The Band's eponymous 1969 album
- "Bands" (song), by American rapper Comethazine
- "The Band", a 2002 single by Mando Diao
- The Band, the de facto name of a pop group featuring Charlotte Jordan and Geri Halliwell

=== Other uses in arts, entertainment and media ===
- Band, nickname of Brazilian television network Rede Bandeirantes
- The Band (film), a 1978 Israeli film
- The Band (manga), a 2024 manga series
- The Band (musical), a 2017 musical by Tim Firth with the music of Take That
- "Band" (Not Going Out), a 2012 television episode

== Clothing, jewelry, and accessories ==
- Armband or arm band
  - Smart band a band with electronic component
    - Microsoft Band, a smart band with smartwatch features from the software giant
- Bandolier or bandoleer, an ammunition belt
- Bands (neckwear), two pieces of cloth fitted around the neck as part of formal clothing for clergy, academics, and lawyers
- Belt (clothing), a flexible band or strap, typically made of leather or heavy cloth, and worn around the waist
- Strap, an elongated flap or ribbon, usually of fabric or leather
- Wedding band, a metal ring indicating the wearer is married

== Military ==
- Bands (Italian Army irregulars), 19th- and 20th-century military units in the service of the Italian "Regio Esercito"
- Female order of the Band, a medieval military order native to Spain
- Order of the Band, a medieval military order native to Spain

== Science and technology ==
- Band (algebra), an idempotent semigroup
- Band (order theory), a solid subset of an ordered vector space that contains its supremums
- Band (radio), a range of frequencies or wavelengths in radio and radar, specifically:
  - Frequency band
  - LTE frequency bands used for cellphone data
  - Shortwave bands
  - UMTS frequency bands used for cellphones
- BAND (software), a mobile app that facilitates group communication
- Band cell, a type of white blood cell
- Bird banding, placing a numbered metal band on a bird's leg for identification
- Electronic band structure of electrons in solid-state physics
- Gastric band, a human weight-control measure
- Signaling (telecommunications):
  - In-band signaling
  - Out-of-band
- Birds Are Not Dinosaurs, or BAND, a controversial stance on the origin of birds

== Society and government ==
- Band (First Nations Canada), the primary unit of First Nations Government in Canada
- Band society, a small group of humans in a simple form of society
- Tribe (Native American), a tribe, band, nation, or other group or community of Indigenous peoples in the United States

== Other uses ==
- Band (surname), various people with the surname
- Resistance band
- Rubber band
- The Band (professional wrestling), the Total Nonstop Wrestling name for the professional wrestling stable New World Order

== See also ==
- Band of Brothers (disambiguation)
- Bandage
- Banding (disambiguation)
- Bandy (disambiguation)
- Bend (disambiguation)
- Drum and bugle corps (disambiguation)
- Herd, a social grouping of certain animals of the same species
- Ribbon (disambiguation)
- Stripe (disambiguation)
- Bands (disambiguation)
