= Music City (disambiguation) =

Music City is a nickname given to Nashville, Tennessee, USA.

Music City, City Music, or City of Music may also refer to:

== Media ==
- Music City (TV series), a reality television series
- MusicCity, a peer-to-peer streaming provider

== Music ==
- Music City Drum and Bugle Corps, a drum and bugle corps based in Nashville, Tennessee, USA
- Music City Mystique, an indoor percussion ensemble based in Nashville, Tennessee, USA
- Music City USA, a 2021 album by Charley Crockett

== Locations ==
- Music City Center, a convention center in Nashville, Tennessee, USA
- Music City Mall (Lewisville, Texas), USA; a shopping mall
- Music City Mall (Odessa, Texas), USA; a shopping mall
- Music City Motorplex, Nashville, Tennessee, USA; a motorsports racing complex
- Plaza Mariachi Music City, Nashville, Tennessee, USA; a tourist and entertainment center
- Trinity Music City, an entertainment complex in Hendersonville, Tennessee. USA
- Wallichs Music City, former record store in Hollywood, California. USA

== Sports ==
- Music City Bowl,. a college football bowl game in Nashville, Tennessee, USA
- Music City Classic, a darts tournament in Nashville, Tennessee, USA
- Music City Open, a darts tournament in Selkirk, Manitoba, Canada; see List of BDO ranked tournaments
- Music City Stakes, a horse race in Franklin, Kentucky, USA

=== Motorsports ===
- Music City Grand Prix, an IndyCar race in Nashville, Tennessee, USA
- Music City USA 420, a NASCAR Cup-series race in Nashville, Tennessee, USA
- Music City 150, an ARCA stock car race in Nashville, Tennessee, USA

== Other ==
- City of Music (UNESCO), an accolade awarded to a city for dedication in music
- Cité de la Musique (French: City of Music), a group of institutions dedicated to music in Paris, France
- Rosh HaAyin (nicknamed "City of Music"), Central District, Israel

== See also ==
- City Music Foundation, a UK organization that supports professional musicians
- City Music, 2017 studio album by Kevin Morby
