= System32 (disambiguation) =

System32 or System 32 may refer to:

- System32, a special folder in the Windows operating system containing configuration files, executables, drivers, and libraries.
- IBM System/32, a computer.
- Sega System 32, an arcade system board.
- System 32, the colloquial term for the 32mm cabinetmaking system.
