= Banding =

Banding may refer to:

- Banding (medical), procedures that use elastic bands for constriction
- Bird banding/ringing, the marking of individual birds with bands or rings to enable individual identification
- Colour banding, an inaccuracy in computer graphics
- Edge banding, a woodworking technique
- G banding, a genetic technique
- Minor variations in outputs from printers and photocopiers that allow forensic identification
- Another name for strapping, the process of applying a strap to an item to combine, hold, reinforce, or fasten it, or the strap or band itself
- Ability grouping, the educational practice of placing students into groups based on their abilities, talents or achievements
- Flow banding, a geological term to describe bands or layers in rocks
- Occupational exposure banding, a chemical risk assessment process

== See also ==
- Band (disambiguation)
