= MCDC =

MCDC may refer to:

- Minuteman Civil Defense Corps
- Mandalay City Development Committee
- Modified Condition/Decision Coverage
- Motor City Dan Campbell (MC/DC)
- Music Choice/Dance Channel
- Music City Drum and Bugle Corps
