= Face frame =

A cabinet with a face frame

A face frame in cabinet making is the frame fixed to the front of a cabinet carcass which obscures the edges of the carcass and provides the fixing point for doors and other external hardware. A face frame provides strength to the front of a cabinet and is also considered a visual feature of particular styles of furniture.

Face frames are a feature of traditional cabinetry which have been replaced in many instances today by frameless cabinets which make use of edge banding to conceal the edge of the carcass. This is most commonly seen in European modular-style kitchens.

== Construction ==
Parts of a face frame

A face frame is simply a framework made up of stiles (vertical pieces) and rails (horizontal pieces) that’s installed on the front of a case. Face frames are composed of a set of intersecting frame members that are joined to one another using one of a selection of woodworking joints. most common joints used are the butt joint or mortise and tenon. The frames consist of vertical stiles and horizontal rails. Individual compartments within the cabinet are divided by mid-stiles and mid-rails. Individual drawers are usually separated by mid-rails and mid-stiles occur between doors and wherever vertical partitions exist within the cabinet (see image Parts of a face frame).

The frame members are generally made from plain rectangular stock but are often visually enhanced through the application of cock beading or applied mouldings. Typically a frame member will be between 25mm to 50mm in width, depending upon the application and the desired appearance of the cabinet. For built in cabinets, it is common for stiles that are to abut a wall to be cut wider than the final size so that these may be scribed to the shape of the wall. This compensates for out of plumb or uneven walls, which are common in many houses.

== See also ==
- Cabinet making
- Frame and panel
- Frameless construction
