= Band (surname) =

Band is a surname of German origin and may refer to:

- Albert Band (1924–2002), film director and producer
- Alex Band (born 1981), musician
- Charles Band (born 1951), film director, writer and producer
- David Louis Band (1957–2009), astronomer
- Doug Band (born 1972), aide and counselor
- George Band (1929–2011), British mountaineer
- Jonathon Band (born 1950), First Sea Lord
- Max Band (1901–1974), landscape artist
- Moritz Band (1864–1932), Austrian writer
- Richard Band (born 1953), composer
