= Ribbon (disambiguation) =

A ribbon is a thin band of flexible material, typically of cloth.

Ribbon or Ribbons may also refer to:

- Awareness ribbon a ribbon worn to signify sympathy for, and raise awareness of, a cause espoused by the wearer
- Ribbon (band), a Japanese J-pop group which consist of Hiromi Nagasaku, Arimi Matsuno and Aiko Satō
- Ribbon bar, small devices worn by military, police, fire service personnel or by civilians
- Ribbon cable, a cable with many conducting wires running parallel to each other on the same flat plane
- Ribbon (company), an online payments company
- Ribbon (user interface), user interface concept
- Ribbon Communications, a technology company based in Westford, Massachusetts, United States
- Ribbon diagram (or Richardson diagram), 3D schematic representation of protein structure
- Ribbon (EP), a 2021 EP by Thai singer BamBam
- Ribbon (film), a 2017 Indian film
- Ribbon, Kentucky
- Ribbon knot, a restricted type of mathematical knot
- Ribbon (mathematics), a geometrical smooth strip
- Ribbon Ridge AVA, Oregon wine region in Yamhill County
- Ribbon (rhythmic gymnastics), a component of rhythmic gymnastics
- Ribbon Takanashi, Japanese professional wrestler
- Ribbon theory, a strand of mathematics within topology
- Ribbons (album), a 2019 album by Bibio
- Ribbons (sculpture), a 2024 work by Pippa Hale, in Leeds, England
- Ribbons VI, a 1989 sculpture by Stephen Fischer in Milwaukee, Wisconsin, United States
- Ribbons, a character in the Doctor Who episode "It Takes You Away"
- Ribon, a monthly Japanese shōjo manga magazine

== People with the surname ==
- Elyse Ribbons (born 1980), American entrepreneur and writer
- Rosie Ribbons (born 1983), Welsh singer-songwriter

== See also ==
- The Ribbon (disambiguation)
- Speech scroll
