= Bands =

Bands may refer to:

- Bands (song), song by American rapper Comethazine
- Bands (neckwear), form of formal neckwear
- Bands (Italian Army irregulars), Italian military term for irregular forces

== See also ==
- Band (disambiguation)
