= Edge banding =

Material or process used in finish carpentry

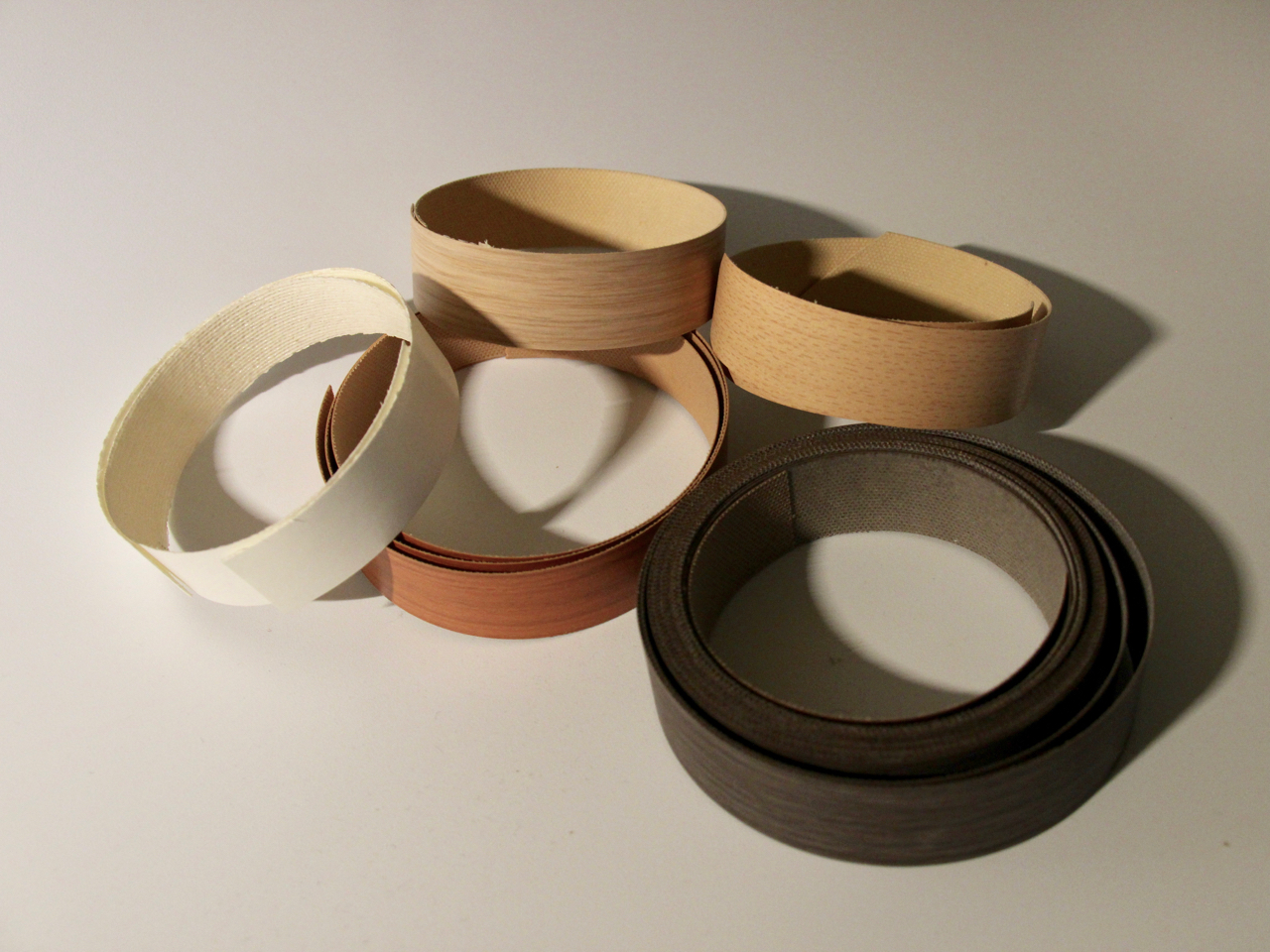
Strips with hot-melt adhesive

Edge banding or edgebanding is the name of both a process, and an associated narrow strip of material. It is used to create durable and aesthetically pleasing trim edges during finish carpentry. The method is used to cover the exposed sides of materials such as plywood, particle board, or MDF. This increases durability and creates the appearance of a more solid or valuable material.

== Process ==
The edge banding or edgebanding method is used to create durable and aesthetically pleasing trim edges during finish carpentry. Traditional edge banding was a manual process requiring ordinary carpentry tools and materials.

In modern applications, particularly for high-volume, repetitive manufacturing steps, the production of as cabinet doors for example, edge banding is applied to the substrate by an automated process using a hot-melt adhesive. Hot melt adhesives may consist of various raw materials including ethylene-vinyl acetate (EVA), polyurethanes (TPU), polyacrylate (PA), APOA, and polyolefins (PO). A substrate primer may also be used as a bonding agent between the adhesive and the substrate. Thicker edge bandings typically require a slight concavity to provide a tight glue line. The thickness can vary from .018 in (0.46 mm) to 0.20 in (5 mm) or even more.

The machine that applies the edge banding is called edge bander. An edge bander bonds the edge banding to the substrate, trims the leading and trailing edges, trims top and bottom flush with the substrate, scraps any surplus, and buffs the finished edge.

=== Quality checking of edgeband ===
Quality checking of edgeband (especially PVC edgeband) is important to ensure durability, appearance, and proper bonding with the substrate. Common quality parameters checked by manufacturers include:

- Thickness consistency and tolerance
- Color matching and uniformity
- Adhesion strength with hot-melt glue
- Flexibility and impact resistance
- Surface finish (gloss level, texture, scratch resistance)
- Edge straightness and curling tendency

Manufacturers typically perform visual inspections, measurement with calipers/micrometers, adhesion tests, and bending tests.

== Material ==
Edge-banding or edge tape can refer to the narrow strip of material being used as the veneer. Edge banding is used to cover the exposed sides of materials such as plywood, particle board, or MDF. This increases durability and gives the appearance of a solid or more valuable material. Common substitutes for edge banding include face frames or molding. Edge banding can be made of different materials including polyvinyl chloride (PVC), acrylonitrile butadiene styrene (ABS), acrylic, melamine, wood, or wood veneer.

Thermoplastic edge banding is produced with an extruder, a machine that consists of a loading system for raw materials, a screw inside a barrel that melts and transports the raw materials (plastics PVC, ABS, polypropylene (PP), polymethyl methacrylate (PMMA) and color pigments), and a dye through which the material is transported to shape the edge banding into the required size. After the edge banding is extruded, it can be texturized, printed, and lacquered to provide the required finish. The edge banding is then rolled and send to customers.

== See also ==
- Cabinet making
- Inlay
- Bead (woodworking)
- Binding (woodworking), on the end-grain of solid wood, to reduce changes in humidity.
