= Music City Mystique =

Indoor drumline based in Nashville, Tennessee

Music City Mystique, also known as Mystique or McM, is an independent indoor drumline based in Nashville, Tennessee. Music City Mystique is a member of the Southeastern Color Guard Circuit and Winter Guard International, and competes in Percussion Independent World class (PIW). Music City Mystique has been a PIW Finalist every year since 1995 and were WGI World Champions in 1996, 1997, 1998, 2001, 2004, 2006, 2011, and 2017. Currently, Mystique is the only 8-time Winter Guard International Percussion World Champion.

== History ==
Music City Mystique was formed in 1995 by Don Click and Chris Finen in Nashville, Tennessee. The group was formed by combining the drumlines of two local high schools, since neither school had the funding nor the members to compete separately. Since then, Mystique has grown tremendously in size and stature. Members come in from all over the country, and from several different drum corps. Most members are college age, while several high schoolers participate as well.

Mystique currently competes in the Percussion Independent World Class in both SCGC and WGI. Mystique has remained undefeated in SCGC since its foundation, and has never finished lower than 7th in WGI. They are one of two WGI World Class ensembles to receive three consecutive gold medals, or a "three-peat", alongside Pulse Percussion. In addition to competitive circuits, the group regularly performs at Tennessee Titans games.

== Past and Current Programs ==
Year	Program Title	Placement	Score	Class
1995	A New Beginning	4th	82.65	PIM
1996	Color of Rhythm	1st	95.10	PIM
1997	A Different Drum	1st	96.25	PIW
1998	Vodun	1st	95.30	PIW
1999	From Dawn Till Dusk: The Serengeti	2nd	95.15	PIW
2000	The Four Elements	4th	91.85	PIW
2001	Strength & Honor	1st	96.50	PIW
2002	The Persistence of Time	3rd	94.20	PIW
2003	Reflections	4th	93.45	PIW
2004	Se7en	1st	95.85	PIW
2005	Cosmic Proportions	3rd	95.25	PIW
2006	McM Traveling Sideshow	1st	96.20	PIW
2007	E=McM	2nd	96.30	PIW
2008	The Adventures of...	4th	94.60	PIW
2009	Requiem	3rd	96.225	PIW
2010	Fantastique	3rd	95.513	PIW
2011	Mantra	1st	97.050	PIW
2012	Nü-Tribe	2nd	95.500	PIW
2013	Taboo	3rd	96.125	PIW
2014	Windows to the Soul	2nd	96.588	PIW
2015	The Game	4th	96.063	PIW
2016	In Bloom	5th	94.863	PIW
2017	The Hand of Man	1st	98.000	PIW
2018	Disciples	5th	94.825	PIW
2019	Medium	3rd	97.5125	PIW
2020	Sol	1st*	87.700*	PIW
2021	Nocturne	-	-	PIW
2022	Come Hell! or High Water!	5th	95.563	PIW
2023	Plastique	6th	94.813	PIW
2024	The Red Line	5th	95.213	PIW
2025	Parasite	7th	94.100	PIW
2026	Ever Evolving	4th	96.600	PIW

- Score taken from final WGI show before the remainder of the season was cancelled due to the COVID-19 Pandemic.
- Music City Mystique opted out of the competitive aspect of WGI's 2021 Virtual Season, participating in the eShowcase instead.

PIM = Percussion Independent Marching
PIW = Percussion Independent World
