= Frameless construction =

Type of cabinet construction

A design for a frameless cabinet

In cabinetmaking, frameless construction of cabinets uses flat panels of engineered wood – usually particle board, plywood or medium-density fibreboard – rather than the older frame and panel construction.

A common construction method for frameless cabinets originated in Europe after World War II and is known as the 32-mm system or European system. The name comes from the 32-millimetre spacing between the system holes used for construction and installation of hardware typically used for doors, drawers and shelves. There are numerous 32mm based cabinet systems, one such system is Hettich's System 32. In North America, it is also often referred to as "European cabinetry".

With frameless or full access cabinets, thicker sides (boxes) keep the cabinet more stable while avoiding the use of the front frame found in face-frame cabinets. Frameless cabinets are usually edgebanded to finish the front faces. By eliminating the front frame, there is more room to place large objects inside and more usable space.

== See also ==
- Frame and panel
- Face frame
- RTA furniture
- Cabinet making
