= Log furniture =

Video of making of log furniture: cutting a bar stool from a log

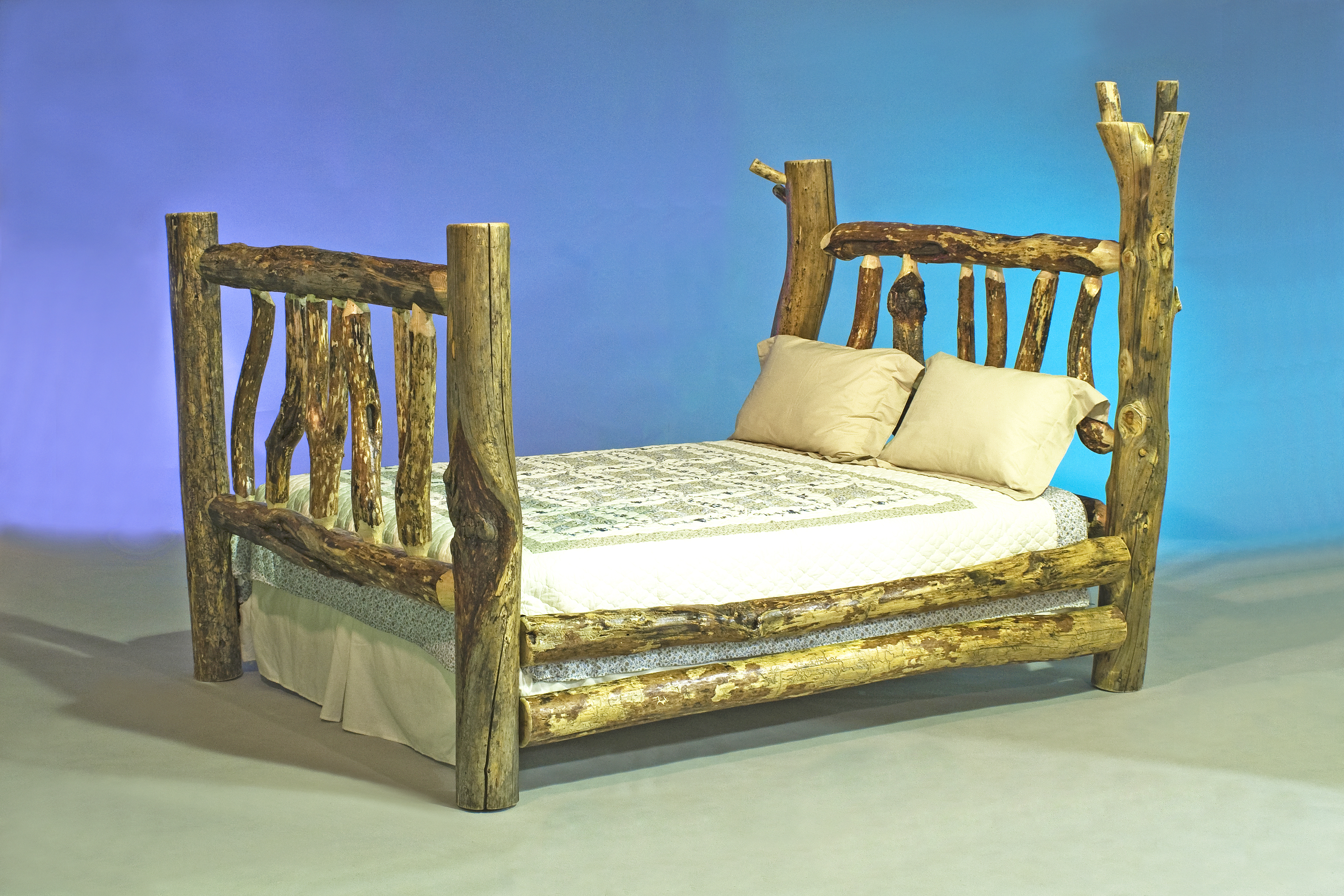
Log Furniture Queen Bed

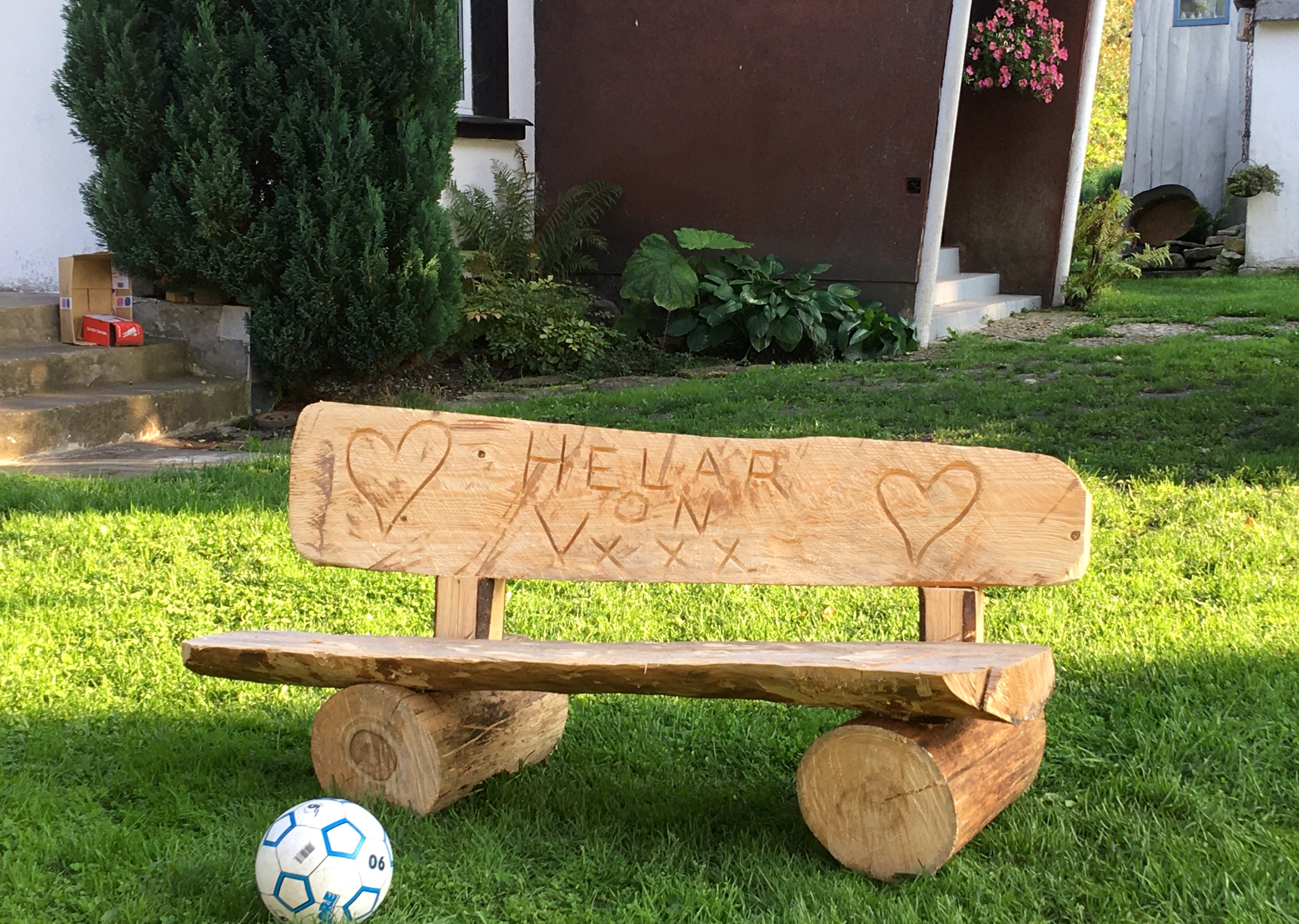
Bench made from logs

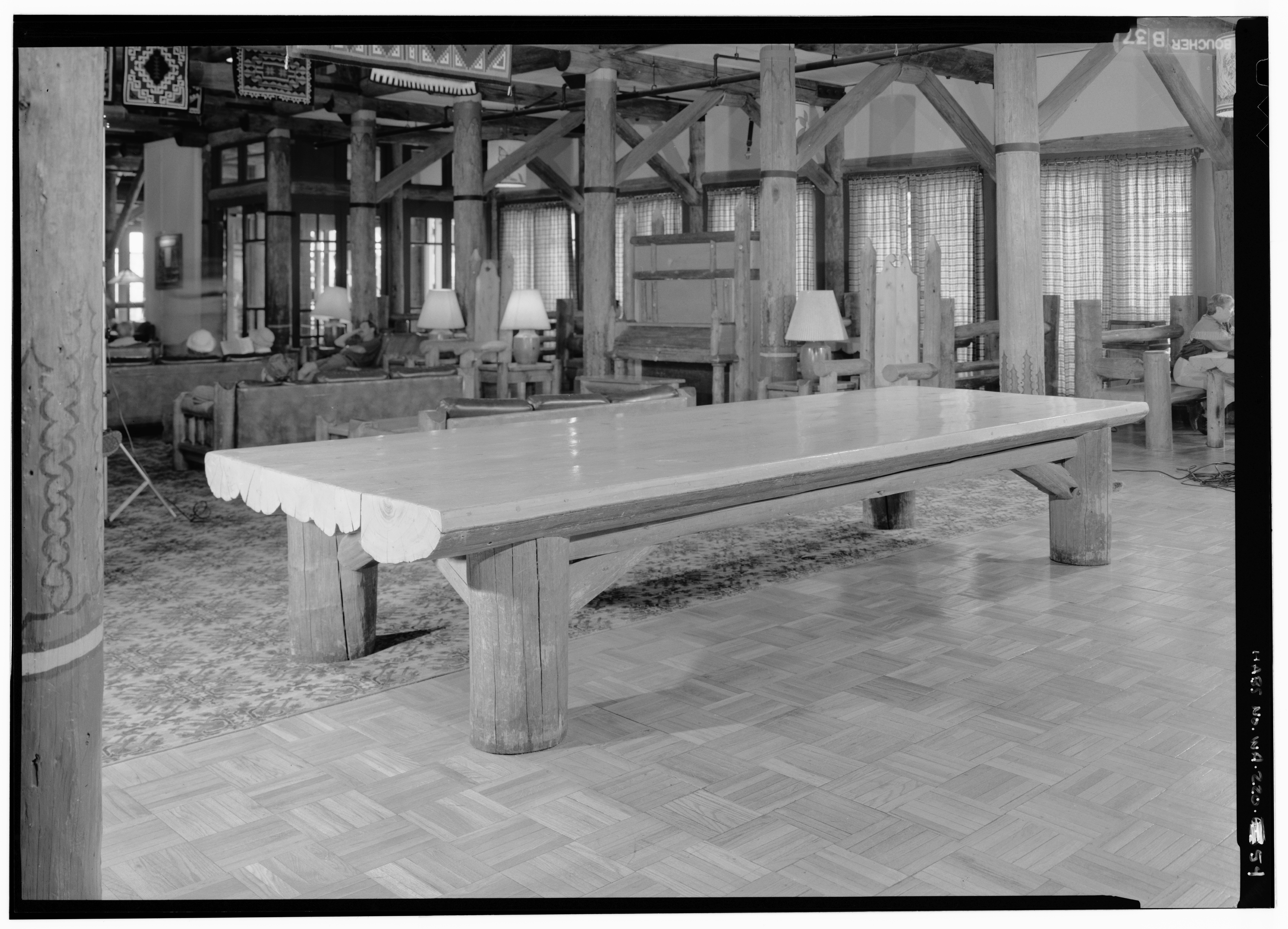
A table cut from logs

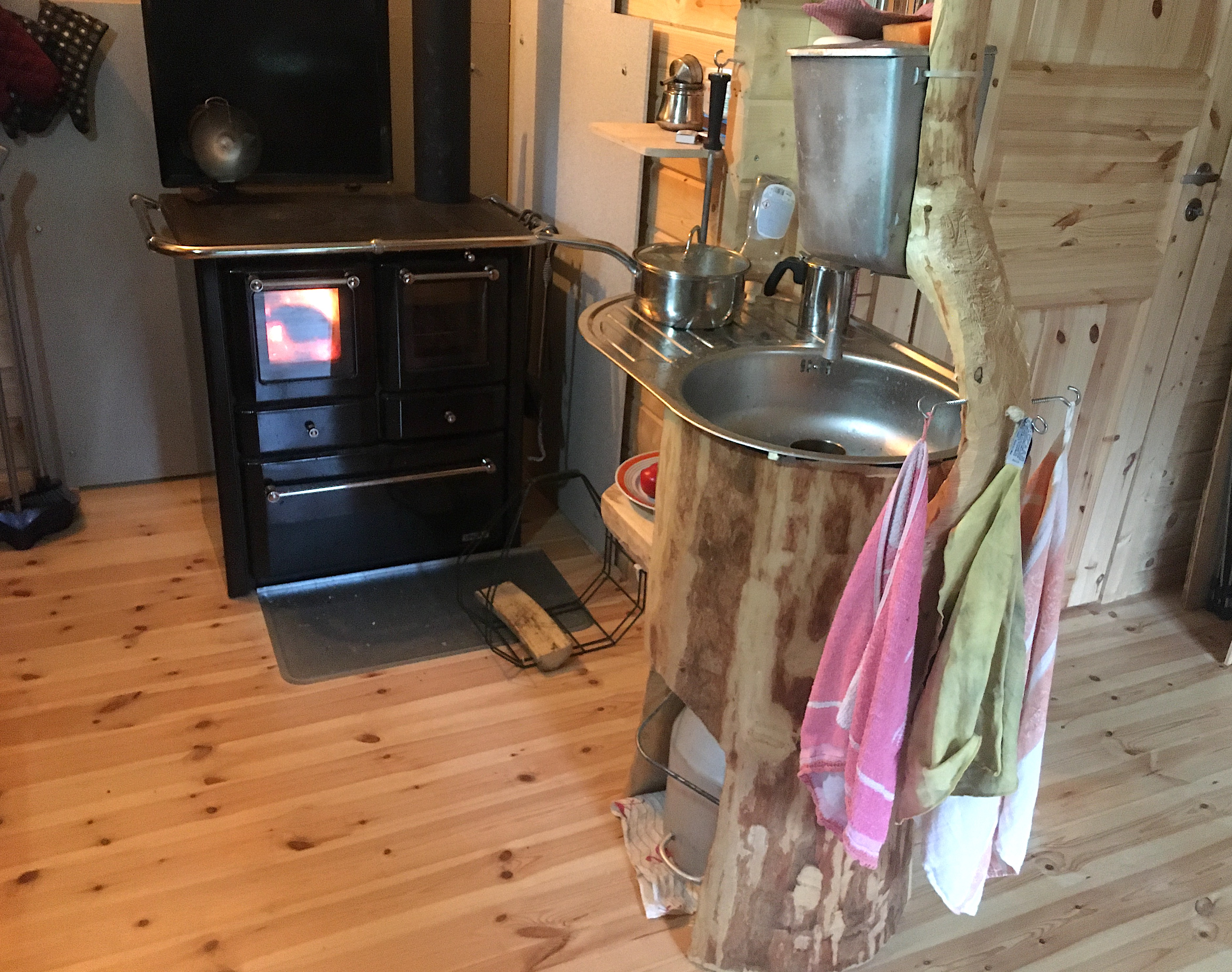
A kitchen sink stand made from hollowed out log for an off grid home

Log furniture is a type of rustic furniture made by incorporating the use of whole logs. It is often designed to have a "pioneer" look. Log furniture is often very durable and long-lasting, depending on the manufacturing methods used.

== Description ==
Log furniture is a type of rustic furniture made by incorporating the use of whole logs. It is often classified as premium furniture because its cost is higher than the cost of what is considered regular furniture.

== Usage ==
Log furniture is often designed to have a "pioneer" look. Log furniture is often featured in country and holiday houses. It is a popular choice for cottage houses and mountain homes. It is most commonly favored in mountainous regions of America (Rocky Mountains) and Europe (Alps). Because of its nature, log furniture can be a good choice for outdoor use; with the right impregnation, it can last decades without the need of refurbishing.

It rose to popularity again in the 2000s after years of decline, caused by accessibility of cheap furniture substitutes. It has now become a sign of wealth and good taste. The log furniture industry is often aimed at local markets, making it a good choice for buyers looking to support the local community. Log furniture is strongly associated with Christmas decor in both America and Europe.

== History ==
Log furniture, reclaimed wood furniture, and other types of rustic furniture have increased in popularity in recent years. As a result, there are many more styles and options available for those looking to furnish their mountain lodges, country homes, or log cabins.

== Manufacturing methods ==
Log furniture is often very durable and long-lasting, depending on the manufacturing methods used. There are various types of log furniture, from the sleek finished look to the rustic "craggy" look. The mortise and tenon method is favored for its strength.

The more economical lines of log furniture are typically milled by machine and are massed produced. Shoppers looking for unique style may opt for the more expensive collections of handcrafted, one-of-a-kind log furniture. Building custom log furniture is time-consuming and can often be quite expensive.

== Wood ==
Log furniture can be manufactured from almost any type of wood as long as the timbers that are used have adequate dimensions and strength. Some of the most popular types of wood include aspen, steam-bent hickory, pine, aromatic red cedar, northern white cedar, walnut, and willow. Some log furniture is made from exotic woods such as osage orange.

=== Checking ===
Certain cracks in logs are referred to as "checks" or "checking." Checking is part of the natural drying process of the wood and normally does not affect the structural integrity of the log. Checks are cracks that run vertically (with the grain). These checks can be as much as three-quarters of an inch in width, depending on the diameter of the log.

== Gallery ==
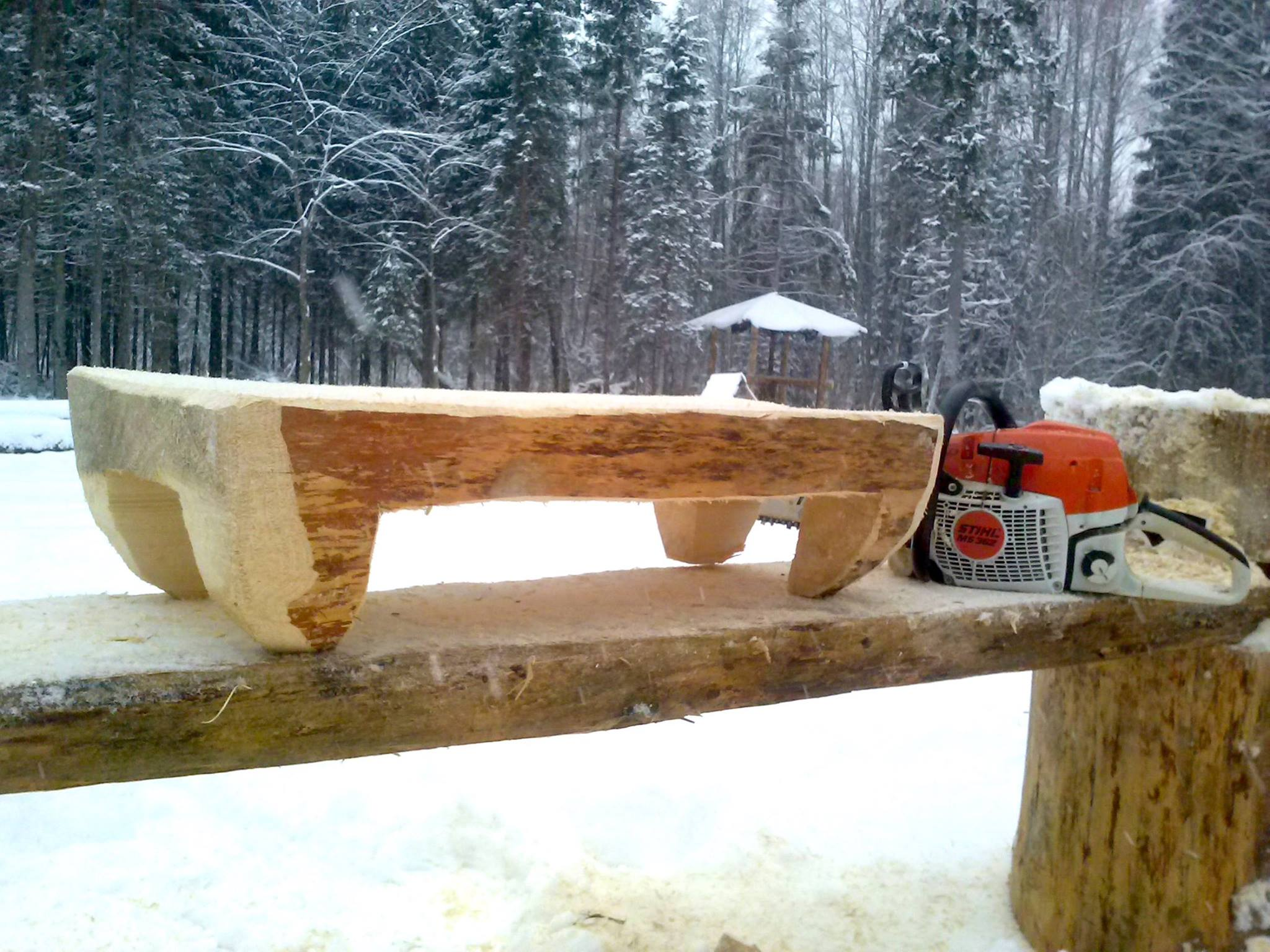
Bedside table made from a log cut in half

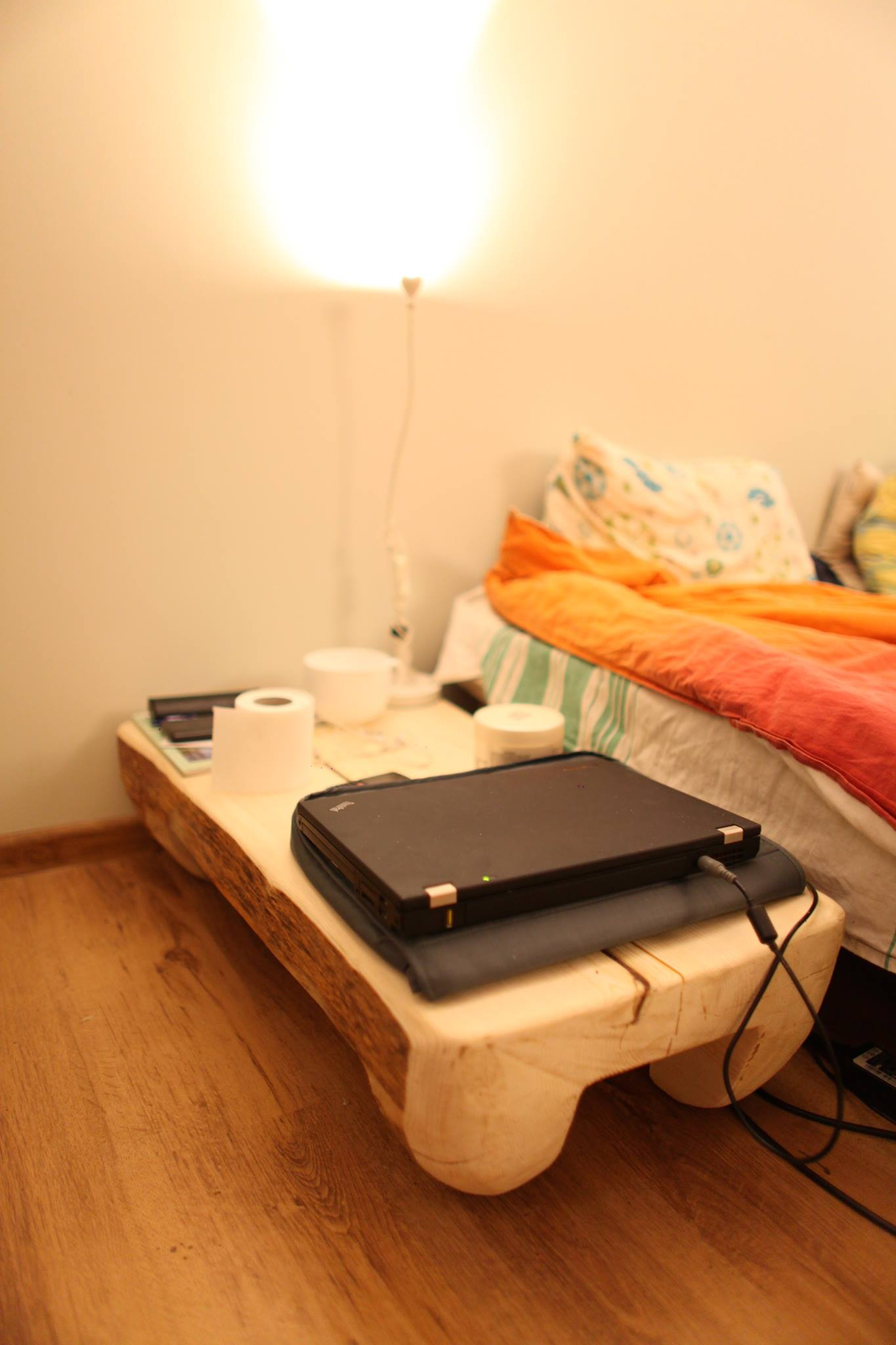
Bedside table made from a log in use

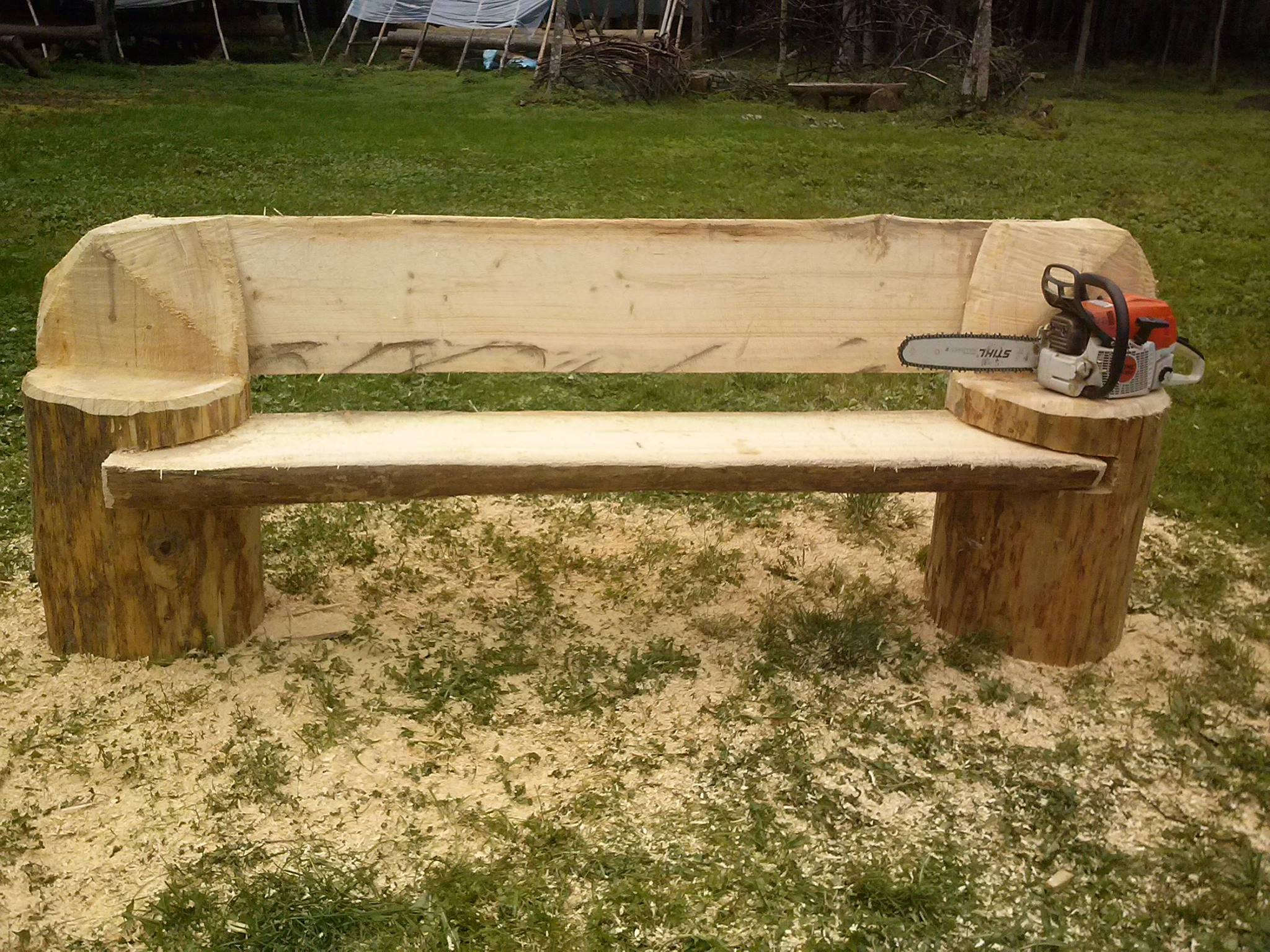
Garden bench from logs

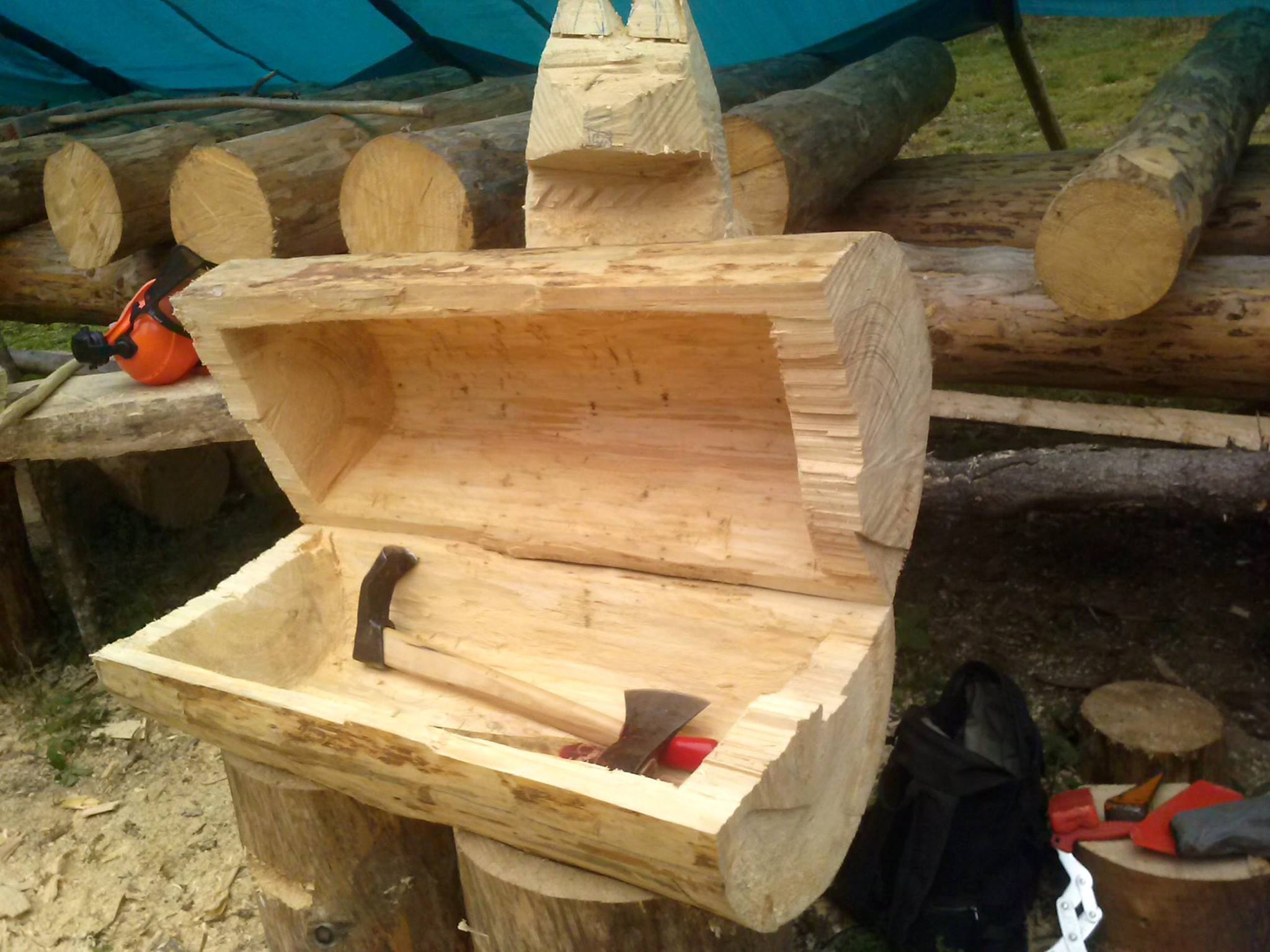
Log furniture: chest from a hollowed log open

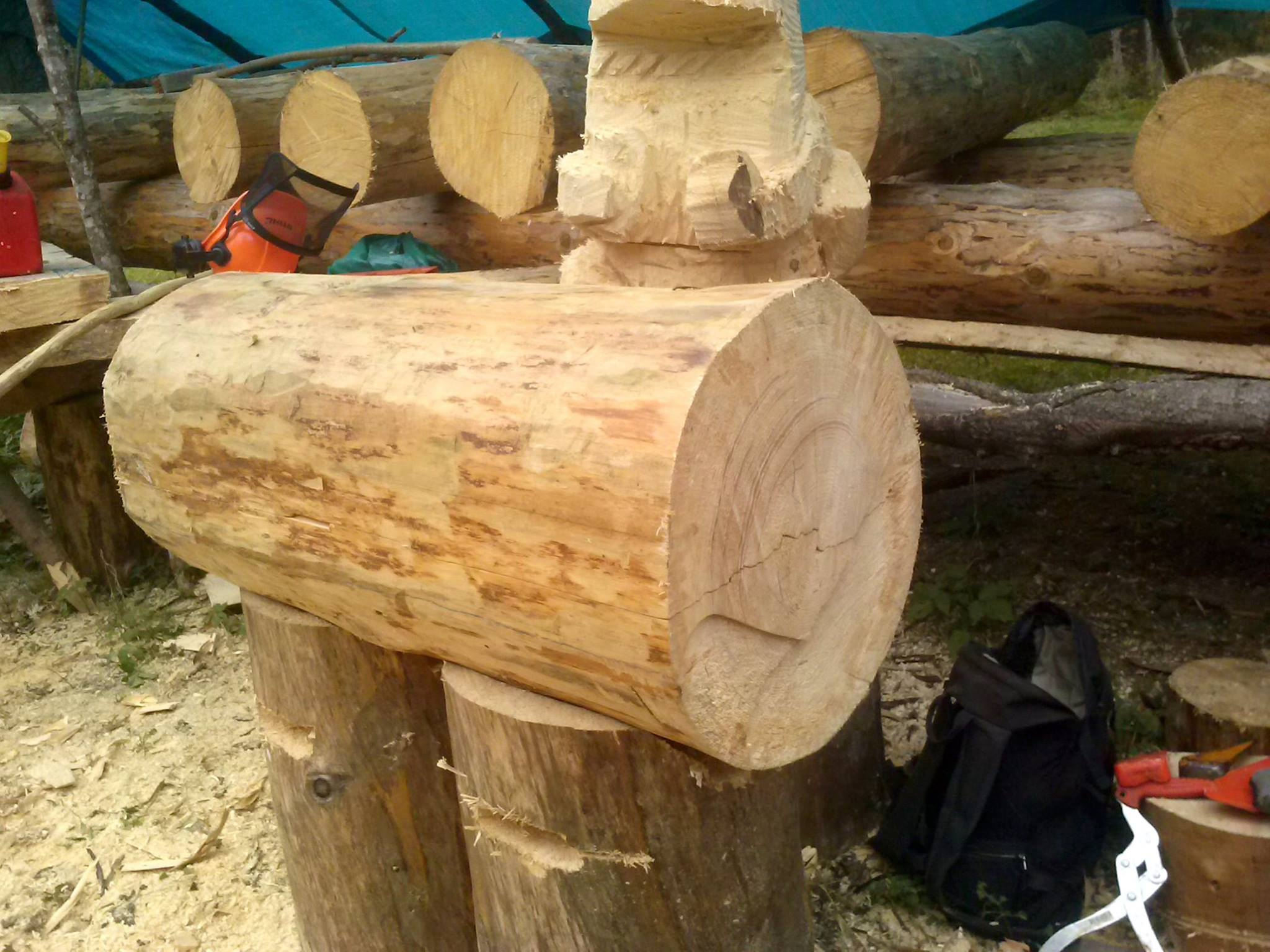
Log furniture: chest from a hollowed log closed
