= Plaza Mariachi Music City =

Music venue and shopping mall in Nashville, Tennessee, United States

Coordinates: 36.0844°N 86.7304°W

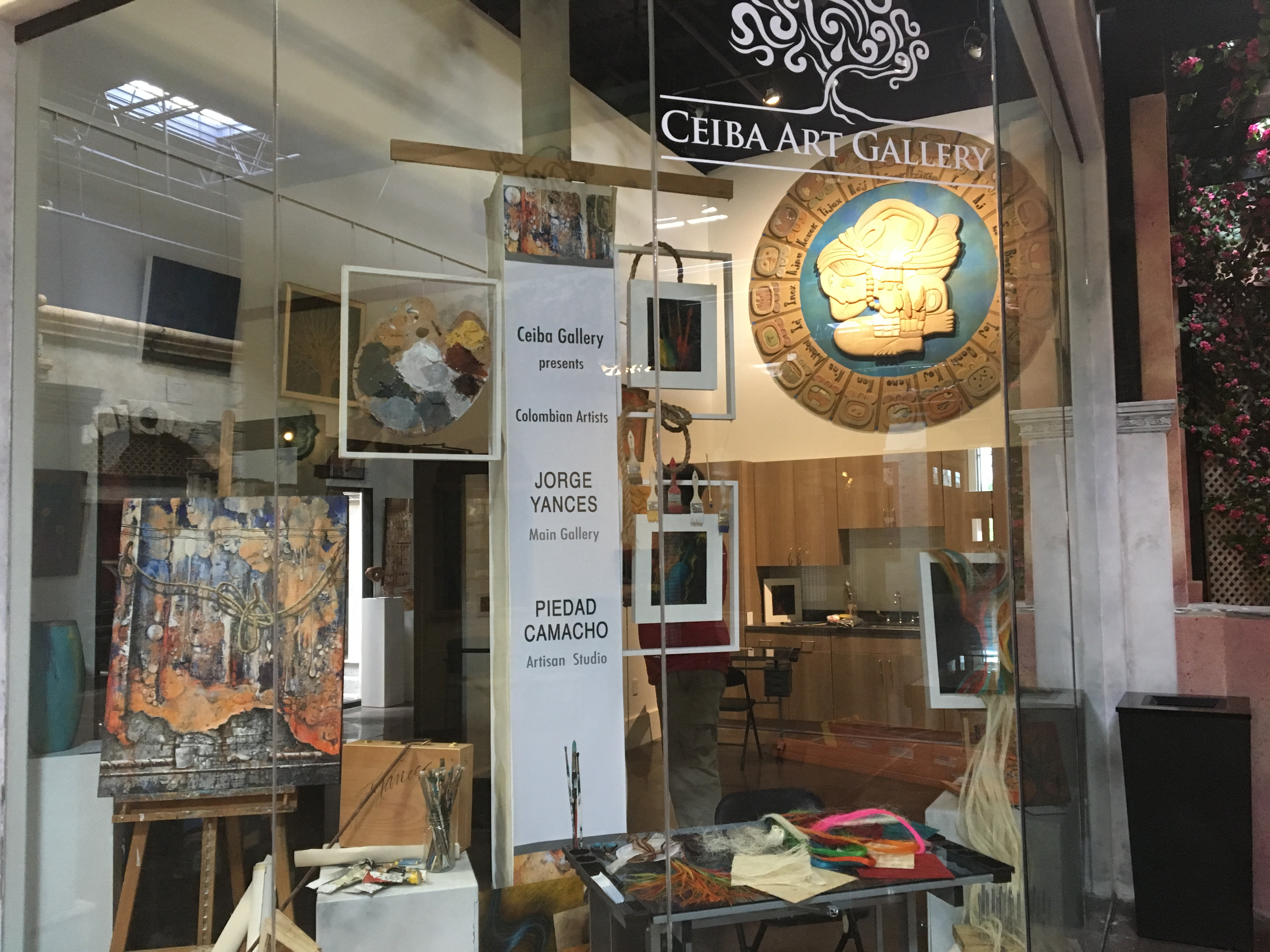
The Ceiba Art Gallery at the Plaza Mariachi Music City

Plaza Mariachi Music City located at 3955 Nolensville Pike, Nashville, TN 37211 is a tourist and entertainment center that includes an art gallery, a Mariachi Hall of Fame, live music, and shopping. The Plaza Mariachi officially opened on May 12, 2017, after 3 years of development at a cost of $15,000,000. US Bank invested $2.3 million in the development of the Plaza Mariachi while also making a $30,000 contribution to the Hispanic Family Foundation, a non-profit organization located at the Plaza Mariachi.

In July 2024, the owners of Plaza Mariachi filed for Chapter 11 bankruptcy protection amid foreclosure threats.
