= 32 mm cabinetmaking system =

Set of furniture construction and manufacturing principles

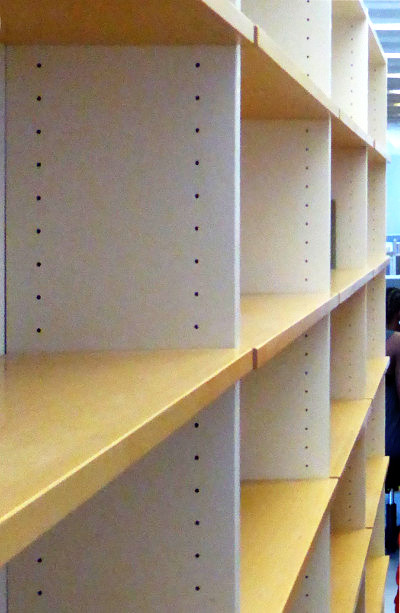
Shelf with 5 mm (0.20 in) holes at 32 mm (1.3 in) intervals

The 32 mm cabinetmaking system (colloquially called system 32) is a set of principles that has evolved for the production of ready-to-assemble and European-style, frameless construction custom cabinets and other furniture. While not defined by any standardization body, it is in wide use globally, partly owing to IKEA using some of its elements in its furniture. Characteristic are the columns of 5-millimetre (0.20 in) holes with centres at 32-millimetre (1.3 in) intervals.

System 32 enables reconfigurable placement and spacing of shelves, doors, drawers and hardware. Most significantly, it simplifies and harmonizes dimensions, production processes and products for fitting, machine and furniture manufacturers, enabling efficiency and cost reduction.

== Properties ==
The core features are:

- Distance between hole centres in row: 32 mm (1.3 in)
- Diameter of each hole: 5 mm (0.20 in)
- Depth of each hole: 12–14 mm (0.47–0.55 in)
- Shelf pin length: 15–16 mm (0.59–0.63 in)
- Shelf pin flange diameter: about 7 millimetres (0.28 in)
- Distance of first row from front edge: 37 mm (1.5 in)

System 32 includes matching fittings, with which furniture sides may be secured to floors, walls, and adjacent cabinets. Other fittings are available for door bands, drawer guides, clothes racks, floor racks, and other features, and typically mount into one or more of the 5-millimetre (0.20 in) holes otherwise used to support shelf brackets.

Advantages of the system include:

- Distance from first hole to bottom side of cabinet equals the distance from last hole to top of cabinet. This simplifies setup of single row drilling machines
- Distances between hole rows are multiples of 32 millimetres (1.3 in). This facilitates assembly of drawer guides
- Distance of rear hole row to rear edge may be 37 millimetres (1.5 in). This obviates need to retool drilling machine
- Distance of rear hole row to inner edge of back wall may be 37 millimetres (1.5 in). This facilitates assembly of rear wall supports

== History ==
After World War II, simplification and efficiency was pursued to help speed reconstruction of the vast number of buildings and property destroyed during the war. A spacing of 32 millimetres (1.3 in) evolved because that was the closest multiple drill bits could be placed on a line boring machine due to the size of the gears then available.

Besides the 32-millimetre-based (1.3 in) system, there are other, although less frequently, used systems, such as system 25 and ip20.

== Proprietary variants ==
Multiple vendors sell products that may be used when applying system 32, including:

- Blum's Process32 system
- Bosch FSN 32
- Festool LR 32 Hole Drilling System
- Mafell DuoDoweler system
- Rockler
- True 32 system
- Veritas 32 Cabinetmaking System

== See also ==
- Adjustable shelving
- Euro container
- Preferred metric sizes
- Reusable packaging
- Reverse logistics

== General references ==
- Buckley, Bob (1999). True32 Flow Manufacturing. True32 Corporation. ISBN 9780967356105.
- Christ, Jim (1995). Modern Cabinetry: European Design & Construction Techniques. Sterling Publishing Company. ISBN 9780806931890.
- Proulx, Danny (2003). Building Frameless Kitchen Cabinets. Rideau Cabinets. ISBN 9780973186901.

== Sources ==
- Adams, C. Carroll (19 October 2012). "Re: 96 mm MFT hole spacing: Reply #7 on: October 19, 2012, 07:14 PM". Festool Owners Group. Archived from the original on 9 December 2024.
- Lers, Dave (19 September 2024). "32mm Cabinetmaking". Dave Lers.
- Levine, P. (1988). Making kitchen cabinets. Taunton Press. ISBN 978-0918804945.
- Lundgren, Philip; Christensen, Kip; Gonzales, Ronald (2001). "A Curriculum for Teaching 32mm Cabinet Construction" (PDF). Tech Directions. Prakken Publications. pp. 1–4. Archived from the original (PDF) on 17 April 2018.
- Nutsch, Wolfgang (2003). Handbuch der Konstruktion: Möbel und Einbauschränke [Manual of Construction: Furniture and Built-in Cabinets] (in German) (2nd ed.). Stuttgart: DVA. ISBN 3-421-03187-8.
