= Band-e Majid Khan =

Band-e Majid Khan بندمجيدخان
- Village
- Location within Iran
- Coordinates: 36°44′15″N 46°08′55″E
- Country: Iran
- Province: West Azerbaijan
- County: Bukan
- Bakhsh: Simmineh
- Rural District: Akhtachi-ye Mahali

Population (2006)
  - Total: 13
- Time zone: UTC+3:30 (IRST)
  - Summer (DST): UTC+4:30 (IRDT)

Band-e Majid Khan (Persian: بندمجيدخان, also Romanized as Band-e Majīd Khān; also known as Band) is a village in Akhtachi-ye Mahali Rural District, Simmineh District, Bukan County, West Azerbaijan Province, Iran. At the 2006 census, its population was 13, in 5 families.
