= Moritz Band =

Austrian writer, playwright and art critic

- Born: 6 October 1864; Vienna, Austrian Empire
- Died: 29 July 1932 (aged 67); Linz, Austria
- Writing career
- Pen name: Stefan Schrader
- Language: German

Moritz Band (6 October 1864 – 29 July 1932), also known by the pseudonym Stefan Schrader, was an Austrian writer, playwright and art critic.

== Biography ==
Moritz Band was born into a Jewish family in Vienna. At an early age he began to write for the press, mostly feuilletons, humorous sketches, and sporting news. After finishing his studies at the gymnasium, he joined Adolf Hartleben's publishing house as secretary.

From 1894 to 1908 Band was senior editor of the weekly newspaper Wiener Bilder, becoming editor-in-chief in 1915. He was also editor of the magazine Der Tourismus from 1908 to 1915.

He lived in Baden bei Wien.

== Publications ==
- Encyklopädie des Buchhändlerischer Wissens. Weimar. 1887.
- Semmering-Führer. Vienna. 1888.
- Rosl (operetta). 1888.
- Dur und Moll. 1888.
- Der Letzte Bombardier (comedy). 1889.
- Aus dem Pensionat (comedy). 1889.
- Band, Moritz (1889). Unsere Kunst in Wort und Bild. Vienna.
- Wiener Künstler-Dekameron. 1891.
- Handbuch des Radfahrsports. 1895.
- Angiolina (novel). 1896.
- Die Hochzeitsreise (operetta). 1900.
- Die Sphynx (operetta). 1900.
