= Asian furniture =

Type of furniture that originated in the continent of Asia

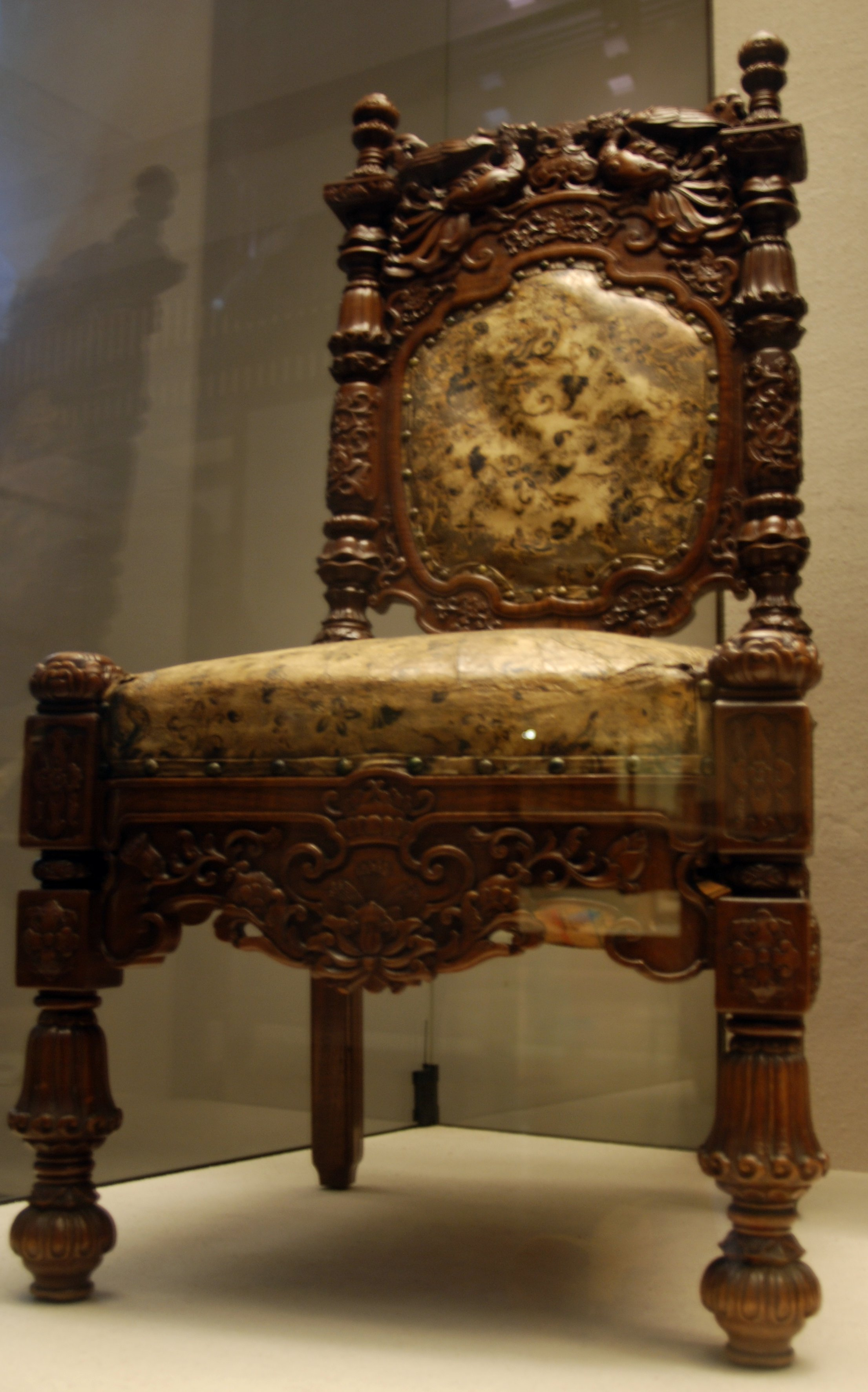
Japanese chair made from carved Zelkora wood with stencilled leather upholstery

The term Asian furniture, or sometimes Oriental furniture, refers to a type of furniture that originated in the continent of Asia. Sometimes people also think of Asian furniture as a style of furniture that has Asian accents. With assimilation with western culture the term can also expand to modern Asian furniture.

Europeans began to receive and collect Asian furniture in the 18th century. Southeast Asian furniture such as Thai, Vietnamese, Indonesian, Javanese, and Balinese furniture are now becoming more prominent and appreciated. Other Asian furniture such as South Asian and Indian are also becoming more popular in interior decorating. There is also the colonial furniture made for the British during their rule in Asia, which includes furniture mostly from India and Myanmar and their reproductions. Southeast Asian furniture are usually dark brown in color with a lot of Hindu-influence carving. Some may have Polynesian accents such as those from eastern parts of Indonesia.

== See also ==
- Chinese furniture
