= The Ribbon =

The Ribbon may refer to:

- The Ribbon International
- The Ribbon, Sydney
