= Music City Drum and Bugle Corps =

Junior drum and bugle corps based in Nashville, Tennessee

Music City
- Location: Nashville, Tennessee
- Division: World Class
- Founded: 2009
- Director: Chaz Bledsoe
- Website: musiccityyouth.org

Music City Drum and Bugle Corps is a competitive junior drum and bugle corps based in Nashville, Tennessee. The corps currently competes in the World Class division of Drum Corps International (DCI).

== History ==
Music City was founded in 2009 by Keith Hall, a band director and former drum major for the then-defunct Memphis Blues Drum and Bugle Corps, who wanted bring back competitive drum corps to the Tennessee region. The corps made its official debut competing in Drum Corps International as part of the Open Class division.

After five seasons of sustained growth, the corps made World Class semifinals in 2013, earning full membership within DCI. Unfortunately, after the season concluded, Music City announced that they were in severe debt and would be unable to return for the 2014 season. However, after a fundraising campaign and help from the DCI board, the corps was able to field for the next competitive season.

In 2018, Music City was approved by the board of DCI to transition from Open Class to World Class. Following its return to competition after the COVID-19 pandemic, the corps placed 17th for three consecutive seasons before attaining its highest ranking of 16th in 2025.

== Show summary (2009–2026) ==
Key
Light blue background indicates DCI Open Class Finalist
Pale green background indicates DCI World Class Semifinalist

Year	Repertoire	World Championships	
Year	Repertoire	Score	Placement
2009	STRIKE IT UP... a celebration! Strike Up the Band (from Strike Up the Band) by George Gershwin & Ira Gershwin / Tennessee Waltz by Pee Wee King & Redd Stewart / Appalachian Morning by Paul Halley	80.400	13th Place; Open Class
2010	River Sounds; Down in the River to Pray (Traditional) / St. Louis Blues by W. C. Handy / Can't Help Falling in Love by Hugo Peretti, Luigi Creatore & George David Weiss / Mississippi Suite by Ferde Grofé / When the Saints Go Marching In (Traditional), adapted by Luther G. Presley / Old Man River (from Show Boat) by Jerome Kern and Oscar Hammerstein II	88.500	6th Place; Open Class; Finalist
2011	Let's Dance; I Could Have Danced All Night by Frederick Loewe & Alan Jay Lerner / Bandstand Boogie by Charles Albertine / Waltz of the Flowers by Pyotr Ilyich Tchaikovsky / Rain Dance by Hunter Stricklin / Singin' in the Rain (from Singin' in the Rain) by Nacio Herb Brown & Arthur Freed / Jai Ho (from Slumdog Millionaire) by A. R. Rahman / Tennessee Waltz by Pee Wee King & Redd Stewart / Dancing Machine by Hal Davis, Don Fletcher & Dean Parks / Shake a Tail Feather by Otha Hayes, Verlie Rice & Andre Williams	84.800	8th Place; Open Class; Finalist
2011		62.200	32nd Place; World Class
2012	Phantoms of the Grand Ole Opera; The Phantom of the Opera, All I Ask of You, The Point of No Return & Music of the Night (all from The Phantom of the Opera) by Andrew Lloyd Webber, Charles Hart, Richard Stilgoe & Mike Batt / Ring of Fire by June Carter Cash & Merle Kilgore / Walkin' After Midnight by Alan Block & Donn Hecht / Sweet Dreams by Don Gibson / Your Cheatin' Heart by Hank Williams / Stand by Your Man by Tammy Wynette & Billy Sherrill	83.850	9th Place; Open Class; Finalist
2012	Phantoms of the Grand Ole Opera; The Phantom of the Opera, All I Ask of You, The Point of No Return & Music of the Night (all from The Phantom of the Opera) by Andrew Lloyd Webber, Charles Hart, Richard Stilgoe & Mike Batt / Ring of Fire by June Carter Cash & Merle Kilgore / Walkin' After Midnight by Alan Block & Donn Hecht / Sweet Dreams by Don Gibson / Your Cheatin' Heart by Hank Williams / Stand by Your Man by Tammy Wynette & Billy Sherrill	62.850	31st Place; World Class
2013	Postcards from Havana; El Cumbanchero by Rafael Hernández Marín / Rapsodia Cubana by Ernesto Lecuona / A Mis Abuelos by Arturo Sandoval / La Suerte de Los Tontos (from Cuban Fire Suite) by Johnny Richards	90.350	5th Place; Open Class; Finalist
2013	Postcards from Havana; El Cumbanchero by Rafael Hernández Marín / Rapsodia Cubana by Ernesto Lecuona / A Mis Abuelos by Arturo Sandoval / La Suerte de Los Tontos (from Cuban Fire Suite) by Johnny Richards	72.750	25th Place; World Class; Semifinalist
2014	Go West! On the Trail (from Grand Canyon Suite) by Ferde Grofé / Billy the Kid by Aaron Copland / The Red Pony by Aaron Copland / Sunset (from Grand Canyon Suite) by Ferde Grofé	72.975	8th Place; Open Class; Finalist
2014	Go West! On the Trail (from Grand Canyon Suite) by Ferde Grofé / Billy the Kid by Aaron Copland / The Red Pony by Aaron Copland / Sunset (from Grand Canyon Suite) by Ferde Grofé	71.575	27th Place; World Class
2015	In the Stars; Mars, Venus & Jupiter; All from The Planets by Gustav Holst	71.125	7th Place; Open Class; Finalist
2015	In the Stars; Mars, Venus & Jupiter; All from The Planets by Gustav Holst	69.625	27th Place; World Class
2016	Coronation; Coronation Fanfare by Robert W. Smith / The Young Person’s Guide to the Orchestra by Benjamin Britten	72.150	6th Place; Open Class; Finalist
2016	Coronation; Coronation Fanfare by Robert W. Smith / The Young Person’s Guide to the Orchestra by Benjamin Britten	71.725	27th Place; World Class
2017	Tribe; Pagan Dances by James Barnes / Goddess of Fire by Steven Reineke / Trail of Tears by Michael Daugherty	76.763	4th Place; Open Class; Finalist
2017	Tribe; Pagan Dances by James Barnes / Goddess of Fire by Steven Reineke / Trail of Tears by Michael Daugherty	74.275	24th Place; World Class; Semifinalist
2018	Hell on Wheels: The Final Journey of Casey Jones; Crazy Train by Ozzy Osbourne / Hallelujah by Leonard Cohen / Maple Leaf Rag by Scott Joplin / Original Music by Robert W. Smith	78.175	21st Place; World Class; Semifinalist
2019	Of Mice & Music; Introduction, Tails on This Town & Plymouth Hoe-down by Robert W. Smith / Imagine by John Lennon	76.650	23rd Place; World Class; Semifinalist
2020	Season canceled due to the COVID-19 pandemic		
2021	Circuloso; Original Music by CJ Barrow, Jeremy Thompson, Matt Penland & Tyler Sammons	No scored competitions	
2022	Gasoline Rainbows; Original Music by Shane Gwaltney & C. J. Barrow	81.763	17th Place; World Class; Semifinalist
2023	Violent Delights: A Rose and its Thorns; Paint It Black by Mick Jagger and Keith Richards / Rite Of Spring by Igor Stravinsky / Any Other Name by Thomas Newman / Go, Lovely Rose by Eric Whitacre / Original Music by C. J. Barrow	82.875	17th Place; World Class; Semifinalist
2024	Leave It At The River; Wayfaring Stranger by Rhianon Giddens / Down by the Riverside (Traditional), adapted by Grandpa Elliott / Fire Water Paper by Elliot Goldenthal / Pyramid Song by Radiohead / Down to the River to Pray by Alison Krauss / Liquid Spirit by Gregory Porter / Original Music by C. J. Barrow	82.625	17th Place; World Class; Semifinalist
2025	It Tolls for Thee; Requiem (Giuseppe Verdi & Wolfgang Amadeus Mozart) / Original Music by C. J. Barrow	83.838	16th Place; World Class; Semifinalist
2026	Venomorphosis; Escalate by Tsar B / Scythian Suite by Sergei Prokofiev / Emergence by Sleep Token / Somebody That I Used to Know by Gotye & Kimbra / Original Music by C. J. Barrow	83.400	16th Place; World Class; Semifinalist
