= Drum and bugle corps =

Drum and bugle corps is a name used to describe several related musical ensembles.

- Drum and bugle corps (modern), a musical marching unit
- Drum and bugle corps (classic), musical ensembles that descended from military bugle and drum units returning from World War I and succeeding wars
- Fanfare band, a variant ensemble composed of related instruments, prevalent in Europe

== See also ==
- Corps of drums, a musical unit of several national armies
- Drumcorps, a metal/breakcore musical project of American musician Aaron Spectre
