= Plastic container =

Container made of plastic

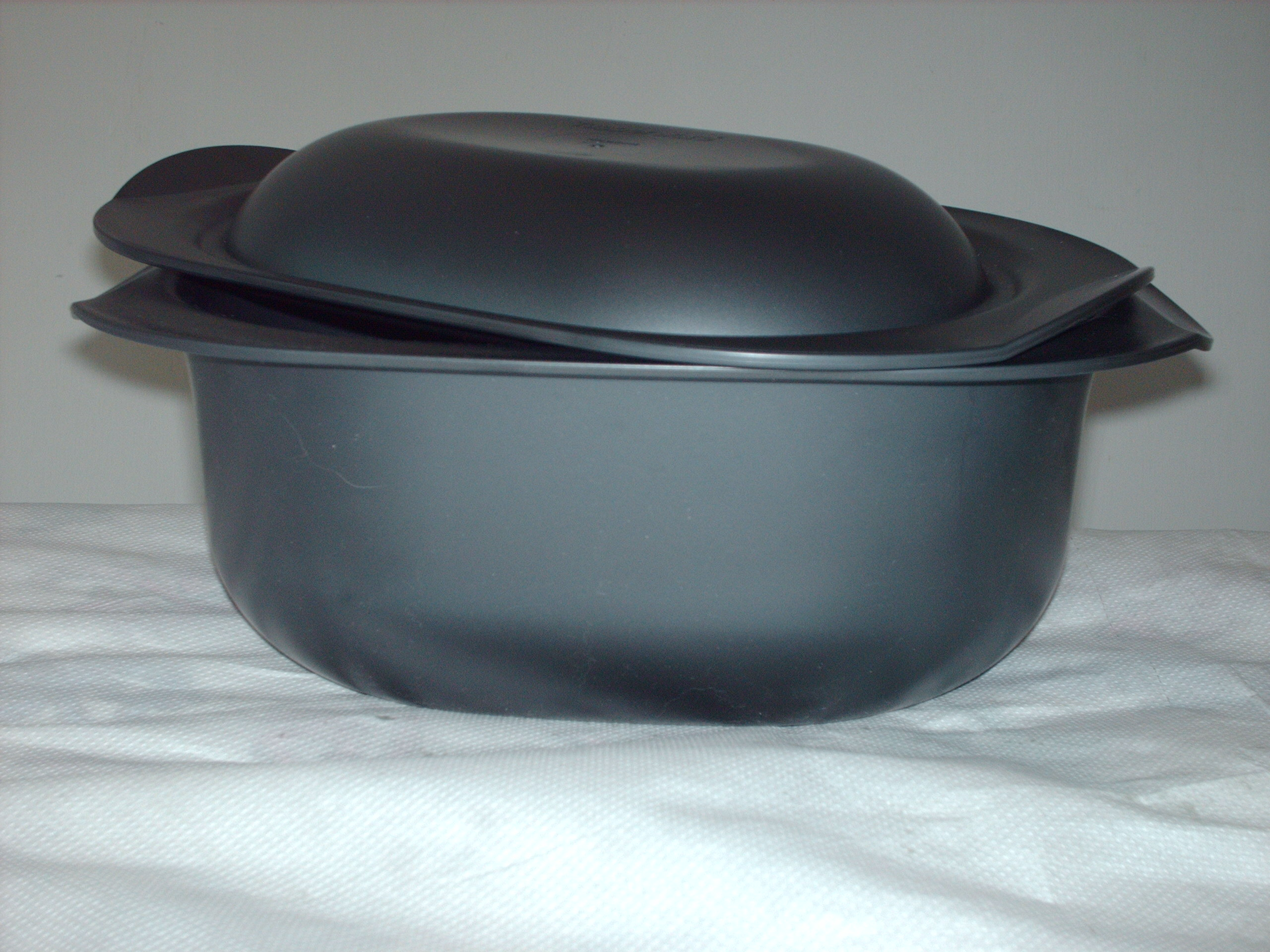
Heat resistant plastic container

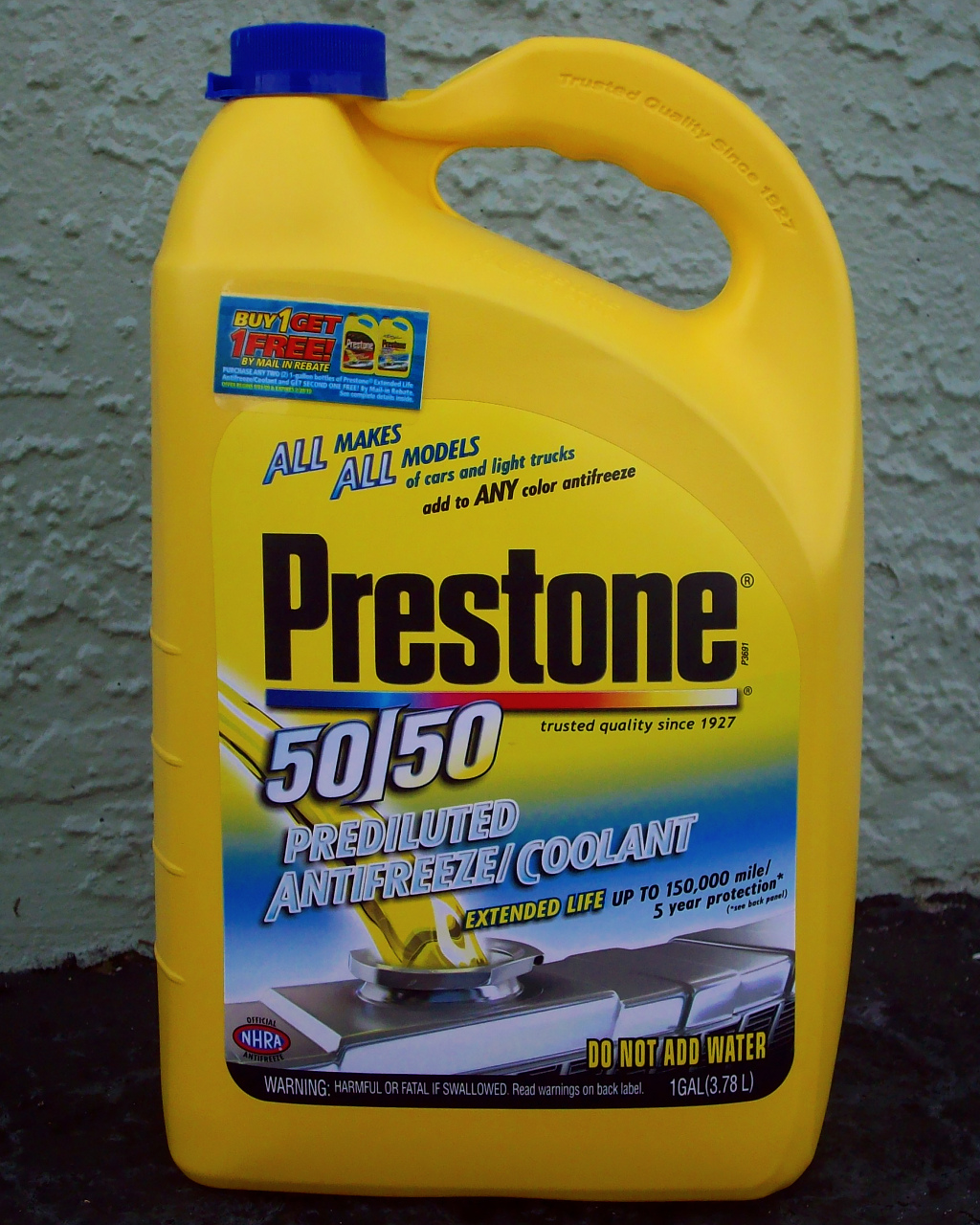
A plastic bottle of antifreeze

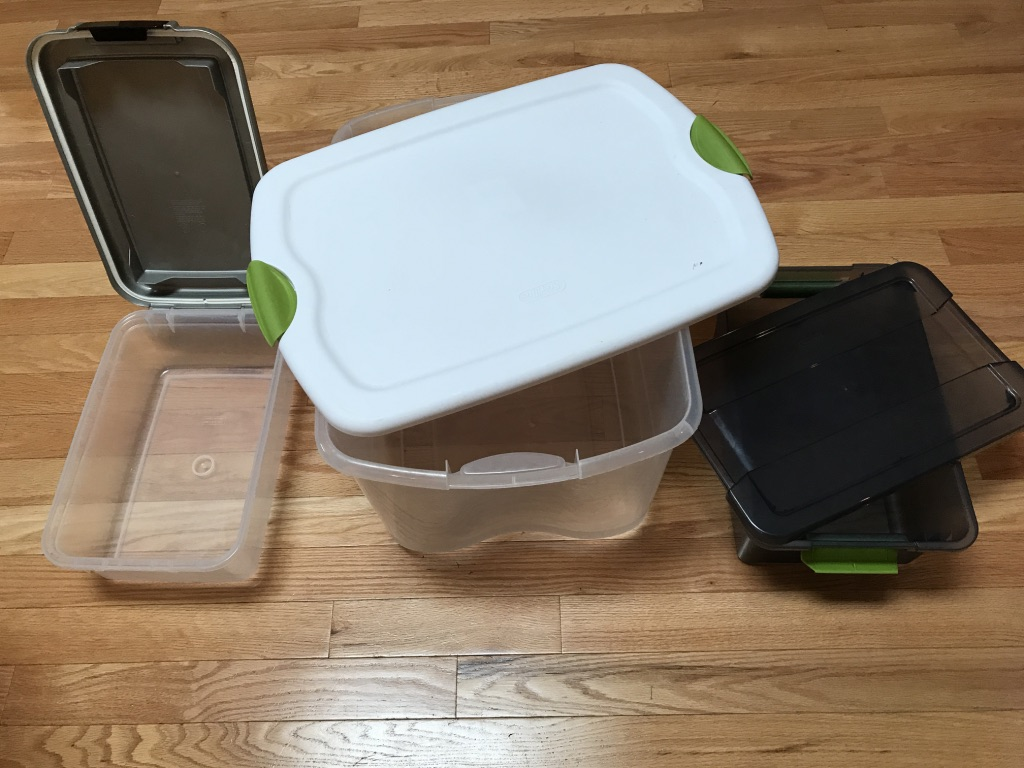
Home storage containers with latched lids

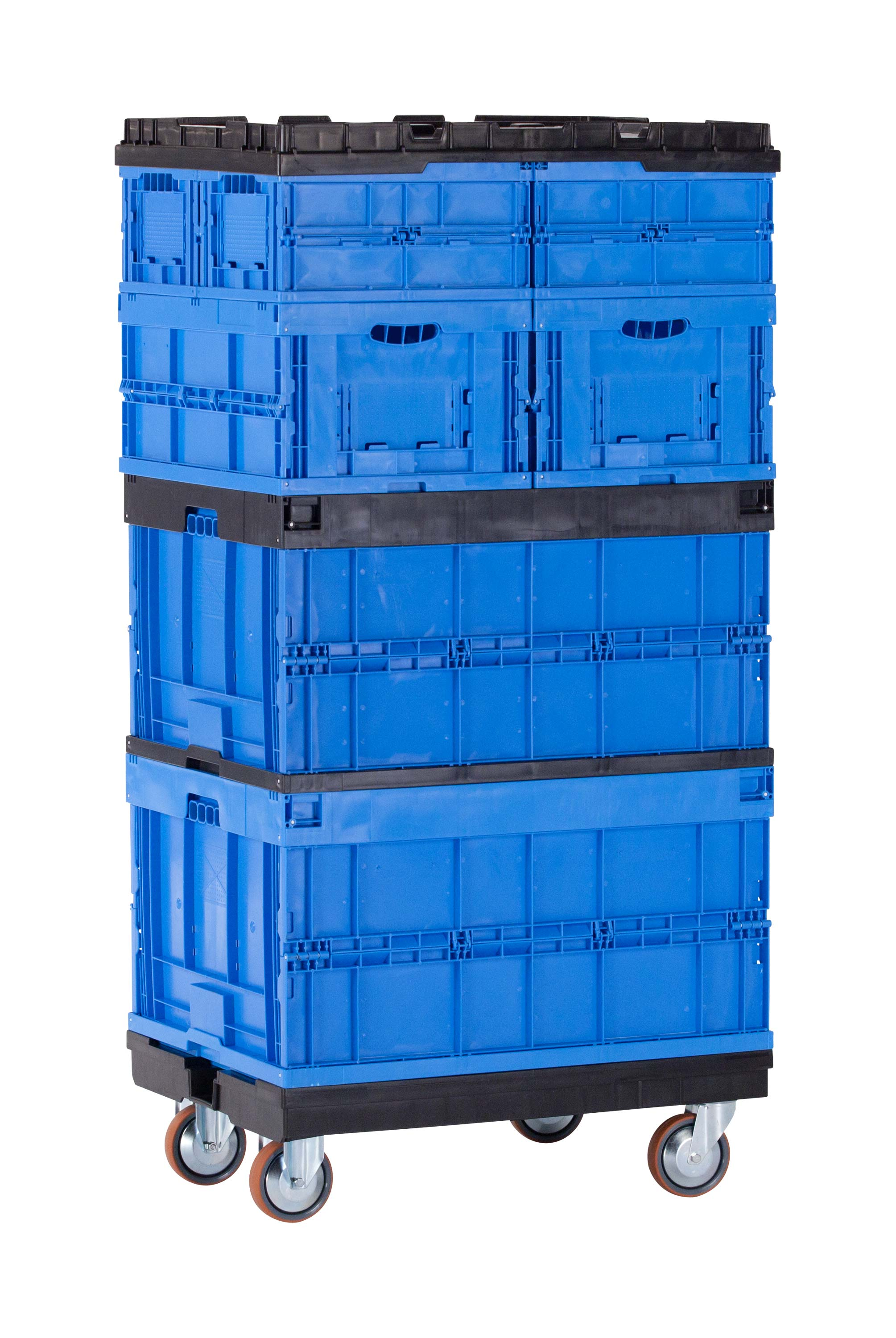
Stackable reusable plastic euro containers

Plastic containers are containers made exclusively or partially of plastic. Plastic containers are ubiquitous, either as single-use or reusable/durable plastic cups, plastic bottles, plastic bags, foam food containers, Tupperware, plastic tubes, clamshells, cosmetic containers, up to intermediate bulk containers and various types of containers made of corrugated plastic. The entire packaging industry heavily depends on plastic containers, or containers with some plastic content (e.g. plastic coating or when made of composite material), besides paperboard and other materials. Food storage nowadays relies mainly on plastic food storage containers.

A basic but important distinction is between single-use / disposable and multi-use / durable containers. The former makes up a notable portion of the global plastic waste (e.g. toothpaste tubs, food delivery foam containers, most plastic bottles, etc.).

Because of the multitude of container applications, the types of plastic vary widely. Because of the material variety (combinations are no exception), the waste will make up a significant portion of plainly visible plastic pollution, although some containers like bottles are recyclable.

The convenience and low cost of plastics are the main reasons for their continuously increasing use. Plastic packaging can keep food fresh longer, prevent food waste, and provide consumers with a greater variety of food. In addition, goods in plastic packaging can be easily transported and distributed. Plastic has replaced traditional materials like wood, paperboard, and metal for the manufacture of containers because of its price, moldability/formability, durability and light weight.

== Waste ==
It is estimated that 3.4 billion tonnes of plastic packaging were created between 1950 and 2017. Most plastic packaging is disposed of within a relatively short time. Discarded packaging accounts for 46% (158 million tonnes) of total annual plastic waste generation. Most plastic packaging waste is estimated to come from household waste. According to a 2010 survey by the Waste and Resources Action Programme (WRAP), 73% of all plastic packaging waste in the United Kingdom came from households. Waste plastic packaging makes up a considerable portion of collected aquatic litter (15.9% in the oceans and 74.5% in rivers).

In a 2019 report, The Coca-Cola Company divulged the company created 3 million tons of plastic packaging in 2017 with Nestlé creating 1.7 million tons, Unilever creating 610,000 tons and Colgate-Palmolive nearly 300,000 tons.

In the late 2010s, 150 companies signed up to be part of The Ellen MacArthur Foundation's commitment to reduce plastic pollution.

== Alternatives ==
Alternatives, such as cotton bags, cardboard boxes and aluminium cans, often have larger ecological footprints because these use up more energy and water to manufacture and transport than their plastic equivalents. In addition, very few countries have facilities for recycling materials that are deemed to be less environmentally harmful than plastic. In most cases, this allegedly safe packaging gets into the natural landscape in the form of waste.

== Trade groups ==
In the U.S., the industry is represented by the Society of the Plastics Industry, Closure & Container Manufacturers Association, Flexible Packaging Association, and others.

== Global market ==
Today packaging is the largest use of plastic resins, accounting for 36% (158 million tonnes) of the world's total plastic production by mass. Plastic packaging is used in the commercial, retail, household, tourism and agricultural sectors. Consumption rates vary among and within countries, with developing countries generally less reliant on packaging. In China, annual plastic packaging consumption is approximately 14 kg/capita; in Europe, the rate is much higher, averaging 174 kg/capita.

Asia Pacific dominated the global plastic packaging market in 2016. In second place comes North America. The pharmaceutical and food and beverage industries contributed the most to the use of plastic packaging products. During 2016, Asia Pacific accounted for more than 30 percent of the shares of the total volume consumption in this market. The Ocean Conservancy reported that China, Indonesia, Philippines, Thailand, and Vietnam dump more plastic in the sea than all other countries combined.

== See also ==
- Fibre-reinforced plastic tanks and vessels
- Health concerns of certain non-biodegradable (fossil fuel-based) plastic food packaging
- Intermediate bulk container
- Flexible intermediate bulk container
- Packaging and labelling
- Packed lunch
- Closure (container)
  - Lid (container)
- Plastic milk container
- Plastic crate
- Litter box
- Toolbox
- Disposable lighter
- Blister pack
- Tub (container)
- Euro container
- Systainer

== Sources ==
This article incorporates text from a free content work. Licensed under Cc BY-SA 3.0 IGO (license statement/permission). Text taken from Drowning in Plastics – Marine Litter and Plastic Waste Vital Graphics, United Nations Environment Programme.

== Bibliography ==
- Soroka, W, "Fundamentals of Packaging Technology", IoPP, 2002, ISBN 1-930268-25-4
- Soroka, W, Illustrated Glossary of Packaging Terminology, Institute of Packaging Professionals,
- Yam, K. L., "Encyclopedia of Packaging Technology", John Wiley & Sons, 2009, ISBN 978-0-470-08704-6
