= It Might as Well Rain Until September =

Single by Carole King

from the album The Dimension Dolls
- A-side: "Nobody's Perfect"
- Released: 1962
- Genre: Pop
- Length: 2:19
- Label: Dimension
- Songwriters: Carole King, Gerry Goffin
- Producer: Gerry Goffin

Carole King singles chronology
"It Might as Well Rain Until September" (1962)	"He's a Bad Boy" (1963)

Audio sample
- file; help

"It Might as Well Rain Until September" is a 1962 single by Carole King, written by herself and Gerry Goffin.

== Background ==
The song was written by Carole King and Gerry Goffin and intended for Bobby Vee, for whom they had already written the song "Take Good Care of My Baby", a number one hit in the United States in 1961. King's demo version of the song was released as a single on Dimension Records and it became a hit for her. Vee used it only as an album track, on his 1963 Liberty album The Night Has a Thousand Eyes. Although she had recorded earlier for ABC-Paramount and Alpine Records, '.....September' was Carole King's first commercial success as a singer, having already had a number of hits as a songwriter. The recording was only ever intended as a demo, and as such there is no master tape, only an acetate.. This is the reason why all digital releases of this recording are of inferior quality compared to other songs of this era.

Don Kirshner liked Carole King's version of "September" so much that, even after hearing Bobby Vee's version, he decided to release King's version as a single on the Dimension label. Carole King had two small children and did not have any interest in traveling the country to promote the record. Despite that, King was ultimately persuaded by Don Kirshner and Gerry Goffin to appear on Dick Clark's American Bandstand, where she lip-synched to the record (as was almost always done on the show) and, unlike many other performers who were given good ratings, was given a terrible rating of a 42 out of 100 by the Bandstand kids. King was devastated by the very poor score, but the song still became popular.

It later appeared on the album More American Graffiti. It is also included on Carole King's 2005 live album The Living Room Tour, on which it is performed as part of a medley with other songs she wrote with Gerry Goffin.

== Charts ==
The single was released in 1962 and made it to number 22 on the Billboard chart in September of that year, appearing on the Hot 100 chart dated October 6, 1962 (chart dates are approximately one and a half weeks ahead of their actual release dates). The recording was considerably more popular in the United Kingdom, peaking at number three in October 1962, the highest position of any Carole King recording in the British charts.

Year	Chart	Position
1962	US Billboard Hot 100	22
1962	UK Singles Chart	3

== Other versions ==
- Bobby Vee, for whom the song was originally written, recorded the song for his 1963 album The Night Has a Thousand Eyes. The song was later included on the compilation albums The Essential Bobby Vee, Legendary Master Series: Bobby Vee and Best of.
- British singer Helen Shapiro covered the song for her 1964 album Helen Hits Out. It later appeared on the compilation albums The Ultimate Helen Shapiro and The Very Best of Helen Shapiro.
- The song was covered by the 1960s studio project Marquis of Kensington and released as their third and final single.
- Australian soft rock group, Dove, issued their version in 1973.
- Canadian pop duo Gary and Dave had it as a hit in Canada in 1974.
- Boy band Child covered the song as a B-side for their 1978 single "It's Only Make Believe".
- Susan Cowsill recorded a version of this song, released as a single in 1976.
- Swedish language versions, "Jag önskar att det alltid vore sommar" ("I wish it was always summer") with lyrics by Bengt Palmers and Eleanor Bodel, were recorded and released by Eleanor Bodel (1969), Flamingokvintetten (1982), Lisbet Jagedal & Pools orkester (1991), Lotta Engbergs orkester (1997), and Drifters (2008).
