= Container =

Receptacle for storing, packing or shipping a product

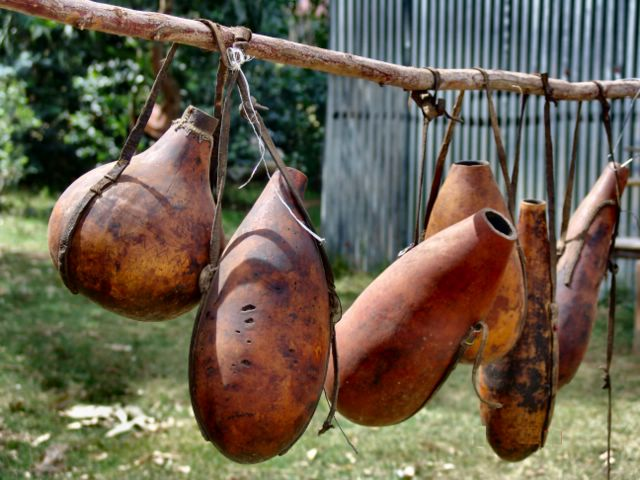
Simple containers made from gourds being sold for use as calabash in Kenya.

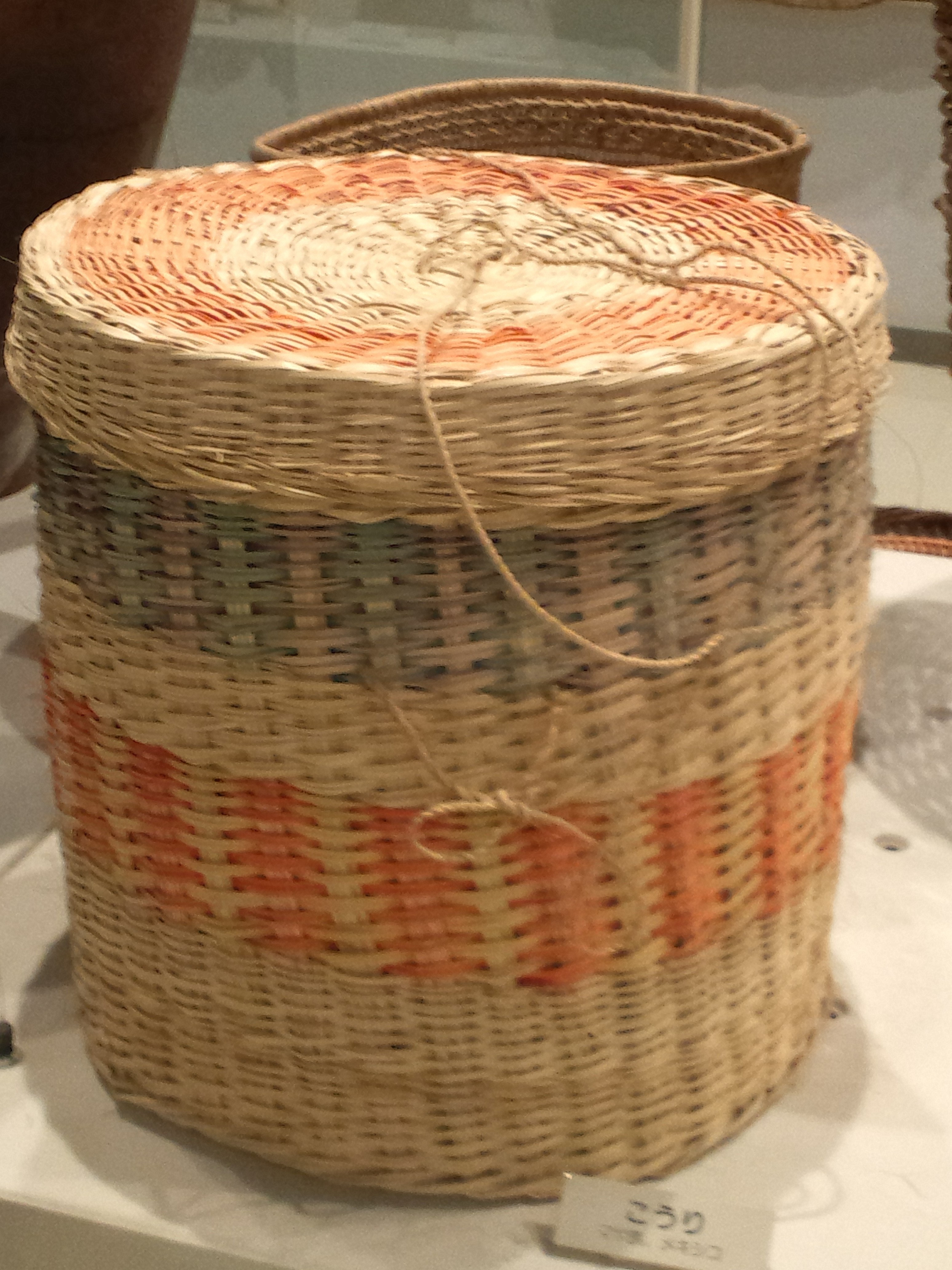
Display of a woven basket from the Maya peoples of Mexico.

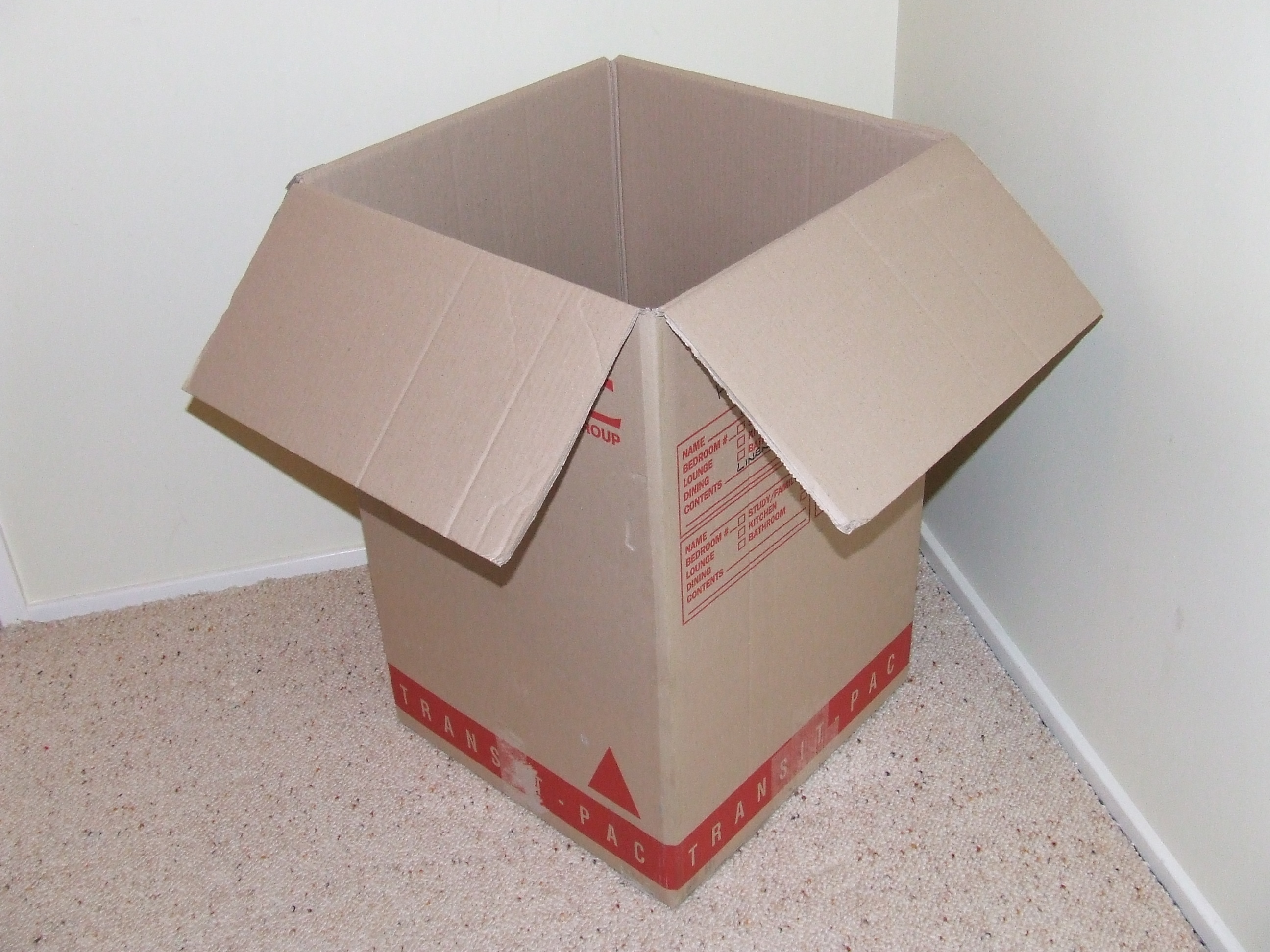
A corrugated fiberboard box.

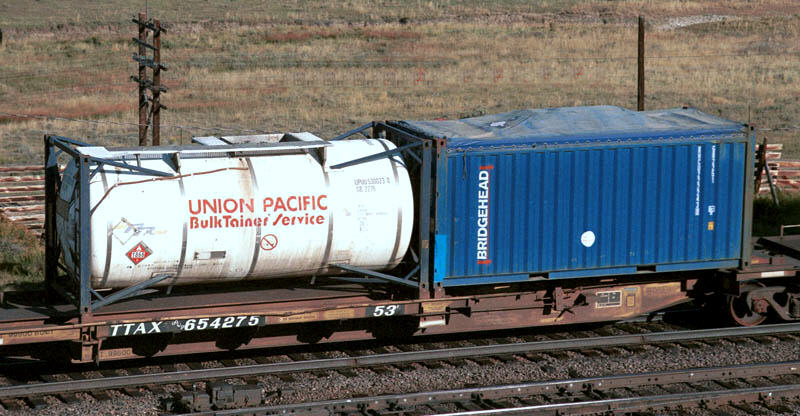
A spine car with a 6 metres (20 ft) tank container and an open-top intermodal shipping container with canvas cover.

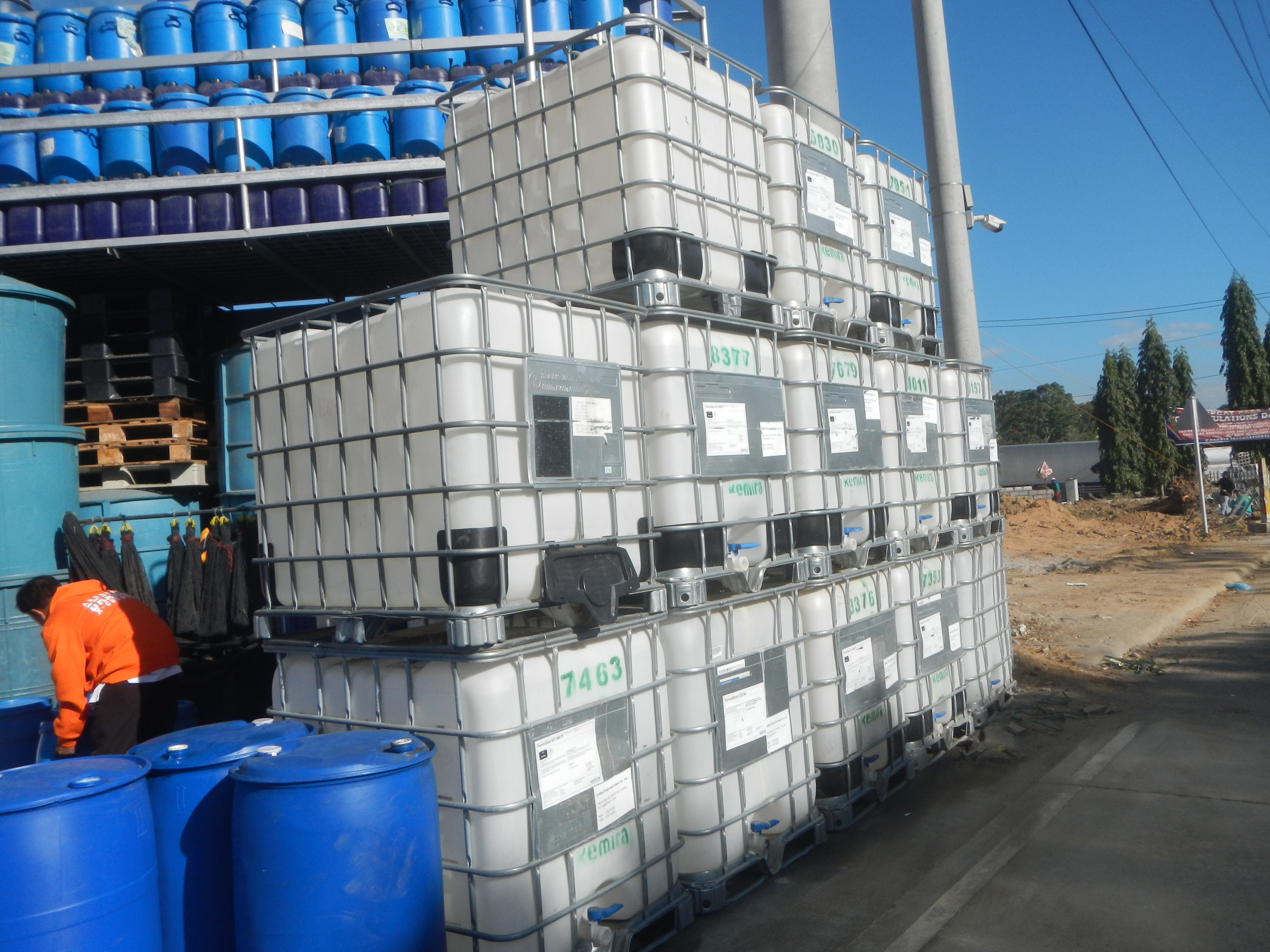
Intermediate bulk containers, commonly used in industrial settings for the handling, transport, and storage of liquids, semi-solids, pastes, or solids.

A container is any receptacle or enclosure for holding an item. Things kept inside a container are protected on several sides by being inside its structure. Humans have used containers for at least 100,000 years, and possibly for millions of years. Containers are used in storage, packaging, and transportation, including shipping.

== Description ==
A container is any receptacle or enclosure for holding an item used in storage, packaging, and transportation, including shipping. A container can also be considered as a basic tool, consisting of any device creating a partially or fully enclosed space that can be used to contain, store, and transport objects or materials.

Things kept inside a container are protected on several sides by being inside its structure. The term is most frequently applied to devices made from materials that are durable and are often partly or completely rigid. Humans have used containers for at least 100,000 years and possibly for millions of years.

== History ==
Humans have used containers for at least 100,000 years and possibly for millions of years. The first containers were probably invented for storing food, allowing early humans to preserve more of their food for a longer time, to carry it more easily, and also to protect it from other animals. The development of food storage containers was "of immense importance to the evolving human populations", and "was a totally innovative behavior" not seen in other primates. The earliest containers were probably objects found in nature such as hollow gourds, of which examples have been found in cultures such as those of the Tharu people, and native Hawaiian people. These were followed by woven baskets, carved wood, and pottery.

Containers thereafter continued to develop along with related advances in human technology, and with the development of new materials and new means of manufacture. Early glass bottles were produced by the Phoenicians; specimens of Phoenician translucent and transparent glass bottles have been found in Cyprus and Rhodes generally varying in length from three to six inches. These Phoenician examples from the first millennium BC were thought to have been used to contain perfume. The Romans learned glass-making from the Phoenicians and produced many extant examples of fine glass bottles, mostly relatively small. By the beginning of the eighteenth century, sizes for retail containers such as glass bottles had become standardized for their markets.

In 1810, Frenchman Philippe de Girard came to London and used British merchant Peter Durand as an agent to patent his own idea for a process for making tin cans. The canning concept was based on experimental food preservation work in glass containers the year before by the French inventor Nicholas Appert. Durand did not pursue food canning, but, in 1812, sold his patent to two Englishmen, Bryan Donkin and John Hall, who refined the process and product, and set up the world's first commercial canning factory on Southwark Park Road, London. By 1813 they were producing their first tin canned goods for the Royal Navy.

For transportation of goods on a larger scale, larger containers remained a problem, as customs officials inspecting imports had to deal with a lack of standardization in this field, and because predominantly wooden containers in use well into the twentieth century were prone to leaking or breaking. The standardized steel shipping container was developed in the 1950s, and quickly became ubiquitous for the large-scale transportation of commercial goods.

Towards the end of the twentieth century, the introduction of computer-aided design made it possible to design highly specialized containers and container arrangements, and also to make form-fitting labels for containers of unusual shapes.

== Modern characteristics ==
A number of considerations go into the design of modern containers:

The product characteristics that create utility for a container go beyond just providing shock and moisture protection for the contents. A well-designed container will also exhibit ease of use, that is, it is easy for the worker to open or close, to insert or extract the contents, and to handle the container in shipment. In addition, a good container will have convenient and legible labeling locations, a shape that is conducive to efficient stacking and storing, and easy recycling at the end of its useful life.

== Variety ==
Practical examples of containers are listed below.

- Ceramic cylindrical vessels including:
  - Ancient vessels such as amphoras, kvevri, pithos, and dolia
  - Bottles, similar to a jar in being traditionally symmetrical about the axis perpendicular to its base and made of glass
  - Jars, traditionally cylindrical and made of glass
  - Jug
- Cylindrical vessels including:
  - Barrels, made of wooden staves bound by rope, wooden or metal hoops.
  - Cans, traditionally cylindrical and sheet-metallic.
  - Drums, similar to a can but definitely cylindrical and not necessarily metallic
  - Tub
- Rectilinear vessels including:
  - Boxes
  - Crates, a box or rectilinear exoskeleton, designed for hoisting or loading
  - Wooden boxes
  - Lift-vans
  - Corf
  - Dumpsters
  - Certain waste containers
- Flexible containers including:
  - Bags, such as shopping bags, mail bags, sick bag
  - Luggage, including satchels, backpacks, and briefcases
  - Packets
  - Gunny sacks, flour sacks
  - Wallets
- Shipping containers, including:
  - Corrugated boxes, made of corrugated fiberboard
  - Intermodal containers, a.k.a. ship container or cargo container
    - Twenty-foot equivalent units, an industry standard intermodal container size
  - Intermediate bulk containers
  - Unit load devices, similar to a crate
  - Flexible intermediate bulk containers
