= Bulk box =

Pallet-size shipping box

Octagonal corrugated bulk box (octabin), with cover

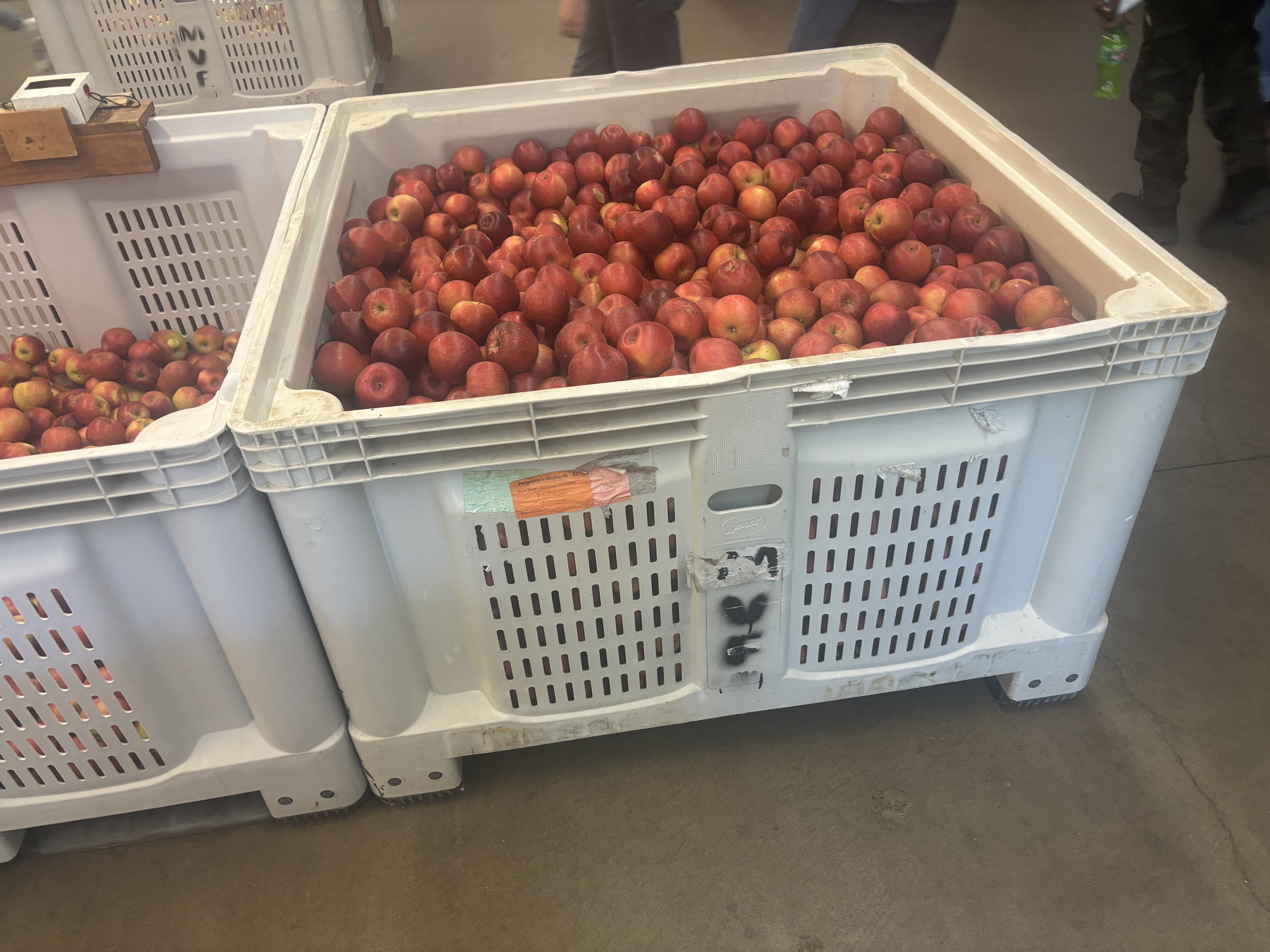
Molded plastic container of bulk apples. Reusable and recyclable.

A bulk box, also known as a bulk bin, skid box, pallet box, bin box, gaylord, or octabin, is a pallet-size box used for storage and shipping of bulk or packaged goods. Bulk boxes can be designed to hold many different types of items such as plastic pellets, watermelons, electronic components, and even liquids; some bulk boxes are stackable.

In the U.S. and Canada, the term gaylord is sometimes used for triplewall corrugated pallet boxes; this is due to the first bulk bins being manufactured by the original Gaylord Container Company of St. Louis, which was acquired by Crown Zellerbach of San Francisco in 1955.

== Construction ==
Bulk boxes are often made of corrugated fiberboard, either doublewall or triplewall. Many corrugated bulk boxes have covers. The main body of some is similar to a half slotted container with flaps on the bottom; others have a separate base (similar to the cover) and a sleeve for side walls. Additional corrugated liners and box reinforcement are sometimes used to control bulging.

Wooden boxes are also used for bulk packaging; boxes made of aluminum and steel are common in heavy industry. Reusable plastic totes (molded or corrugated plastic) are used for some products and logistics chains.

For some products, inner plastic liners or bin bags are used to protect the contents. Sealed inner bags with integral valves are sometimes used for liquids. Most bulk boxes are recyclable, returnable, or reusable. Some styles of boxes fold (knock down) or come apart for easier return shipments.

== Use ==
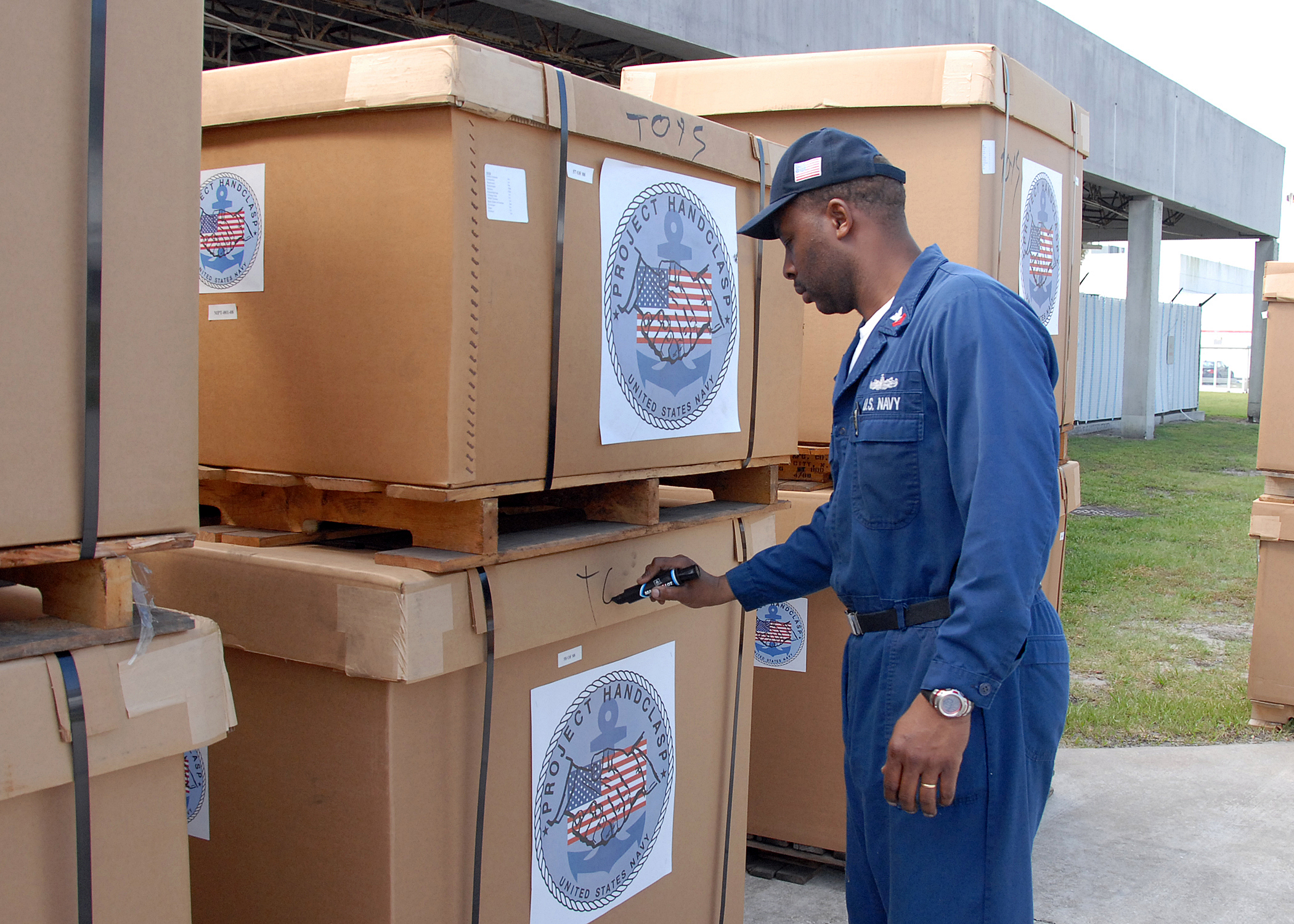
Humanitarian aid shipped in pallet boxes. Cover secured with strapping

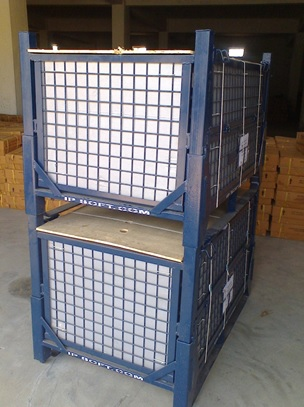
Reusable steel bins or racks for bulk products

Bulk boxes are used for loose parts, mixed small containers, granular materials, powders, liquids, etc. Use in industry is common: shipping and storage of bulk intermediate materials prior to further processing or packaging. They are sometimes used to collect and ship materials for recycling and waste.

When used to ship hazardous waste or dangerous goods, box construction and use are highly regulated.

== ASTM standards ==
- D5168 Standard Practice for Fabrication and Closure of Triple-wall Corrugated Containers
- D6179 Standard Test Methods for Rough Handling of Unitized Loads and Large Shipping Cases and Crates
- D6251 Standard Specification for Wood-Cleated Panelboard Shipping Boxes
- D6254 Standard Specification for Wirebound Pallet-Type Wood Boxes
- D6256 Standard Specification for Wood-Cleated Shipping Boxes and Skidded, Load-Bearing Bases
- D6573 Standard Specification for General Purpose Wirebound Shipping Boxes
- D6880-05 Standard Specification for wooden boxes

== See also ==
- Corrugated box design
- Intermediate bulk container
- Shipping container
- Dutch flower bucket
