= Royal FloraHolland =

Dutch florist conglomerate

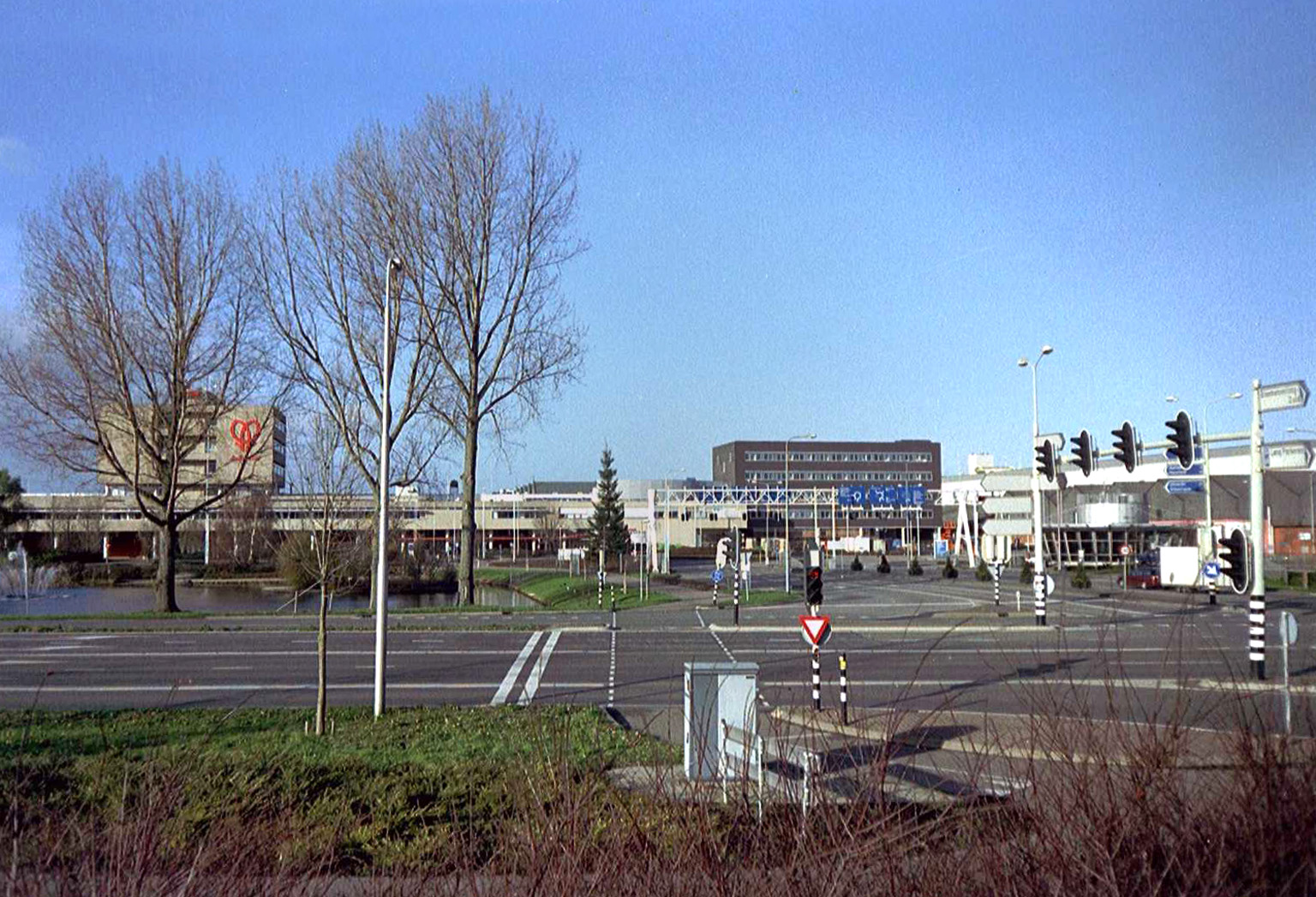
- Royal FloraHolland headquarters in Aalsmeer
- Company type: Cooperative
- Industry: Floristry
- Predecessor: Verenigde Bloemenveilingen Aalsmeer (VBA); FloraHolland (FL)
- Founded: January 1, 2008; 18 years ago
- Headquarters: Legmeerdijk 313, Aalsmeer, Netherlands
- Number of locations: Aalsmeer; Naaldwijk; Rijnsburg; Eelde
- Area served: Worldwide
- Key people: Jack Goossens (Chairman); Pieter Bootsma (CEO)
- Revenue: ▲€4.6 billion (2015)
- Net income: ▲€12.5 million (2015)
- Website: RoyalFloraHolland.com

Royal FloraHolland, legally Koninklijke Coöperatieve Bloemenveiling Royal FloraHolland U.A., is a Dutch conglomerate of florists. It is one of the largest auction companies in the world. Royal FloraHolland is headquartered in Aalsmeer, with locations in Naaldwijk, Rijnsburg and Eelde.

The export auctions are located in Aalsmeer, Naaldwijk and Rijnsburg, and there is an auction for the domestic market in Eelde. The brokerage agency focuses on futures and day trade and operates at all branches.

Measuring 740 by 700 meters, the auction building in Aalsmeer is the largest building in Europe by floor area. Until 2008, it was the largest building in the world (currently ranked fifth).

== Company ==
FloraHolland is a non-profit organization which is a result of a merger between FloraHolland and Aalsmeer Flower Auction in 2007.

During the COVID-19 pandemic in 2020, FloraHolland's sales collapsed by over 70 percent due to the drop in global demand. In March 2020 alone, 400 million flowers had to be destroyed, including 160 million tulips. In the event that the crisis would last longer, total damage of two to three billion euros were expected. In 2020, the company took over three transporters of flowers and plants. The transport companies De Winter, Van Marrewijk (Wematrans) and Van Zaal are incorporated into a new independent company called Floriway.

== History by location ==
=== Aalsmeer ===
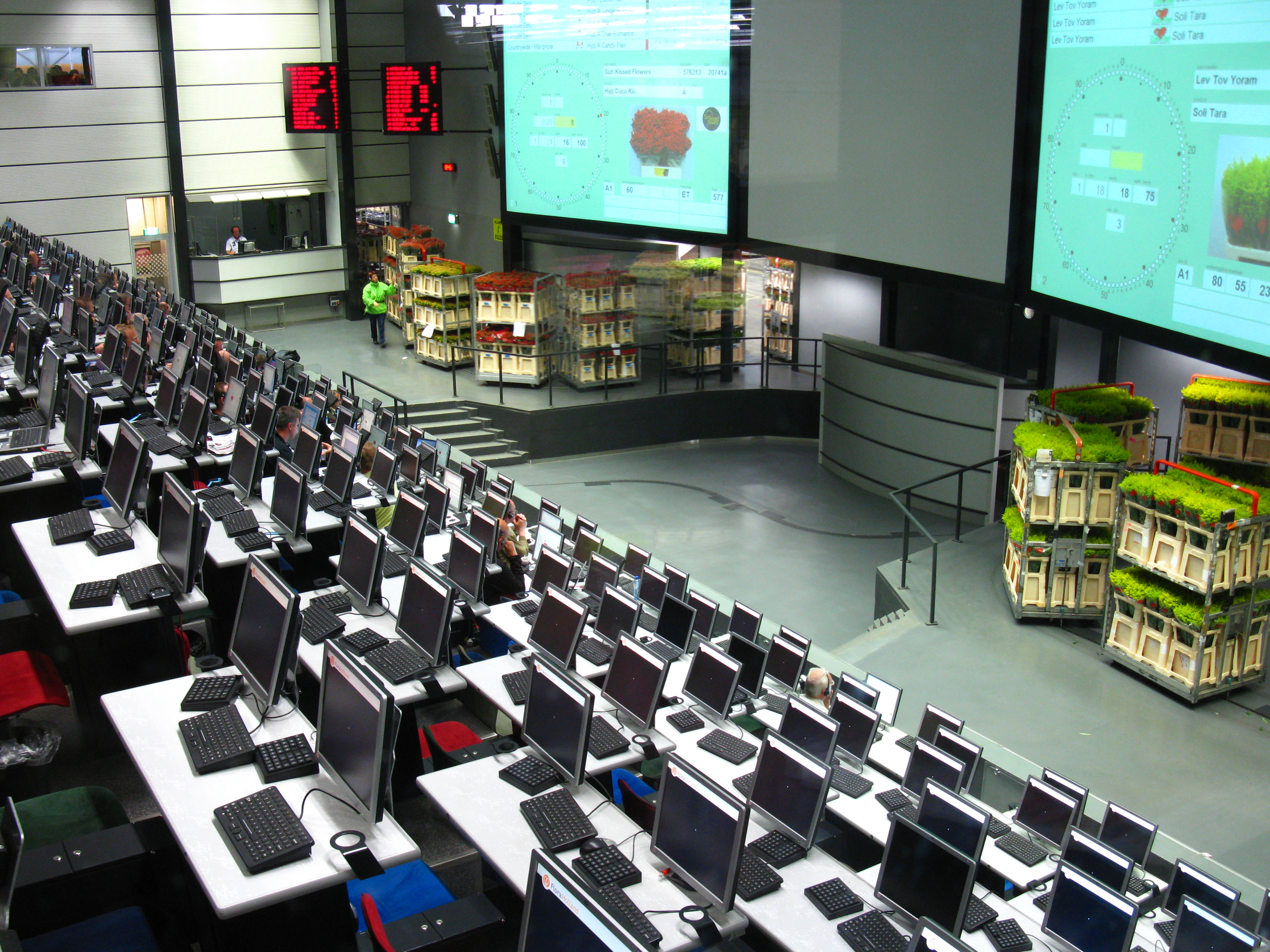
FloraHolland Aalsmeer auction room.

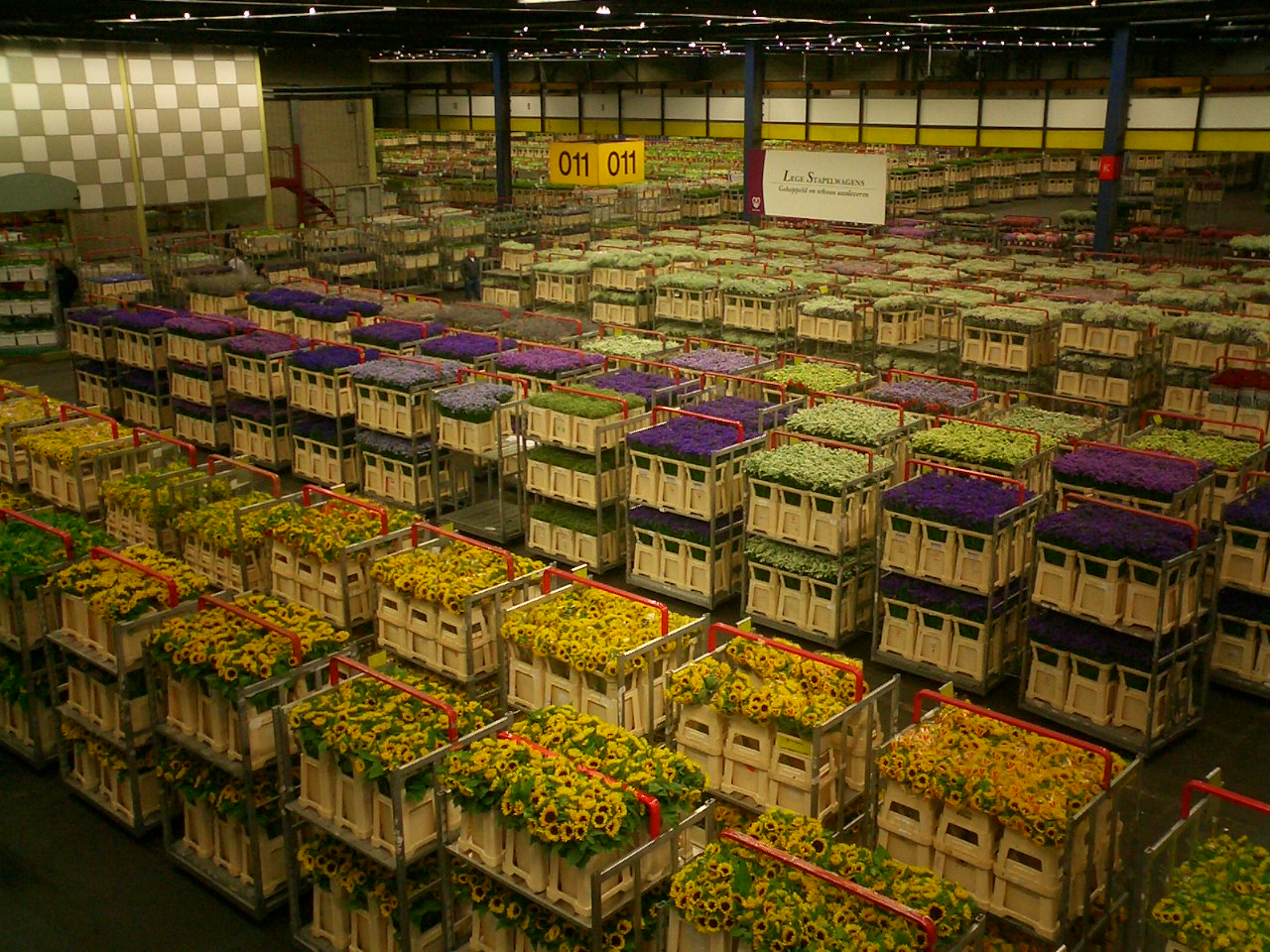
FloraHolland Aalsmeer assembly hall.

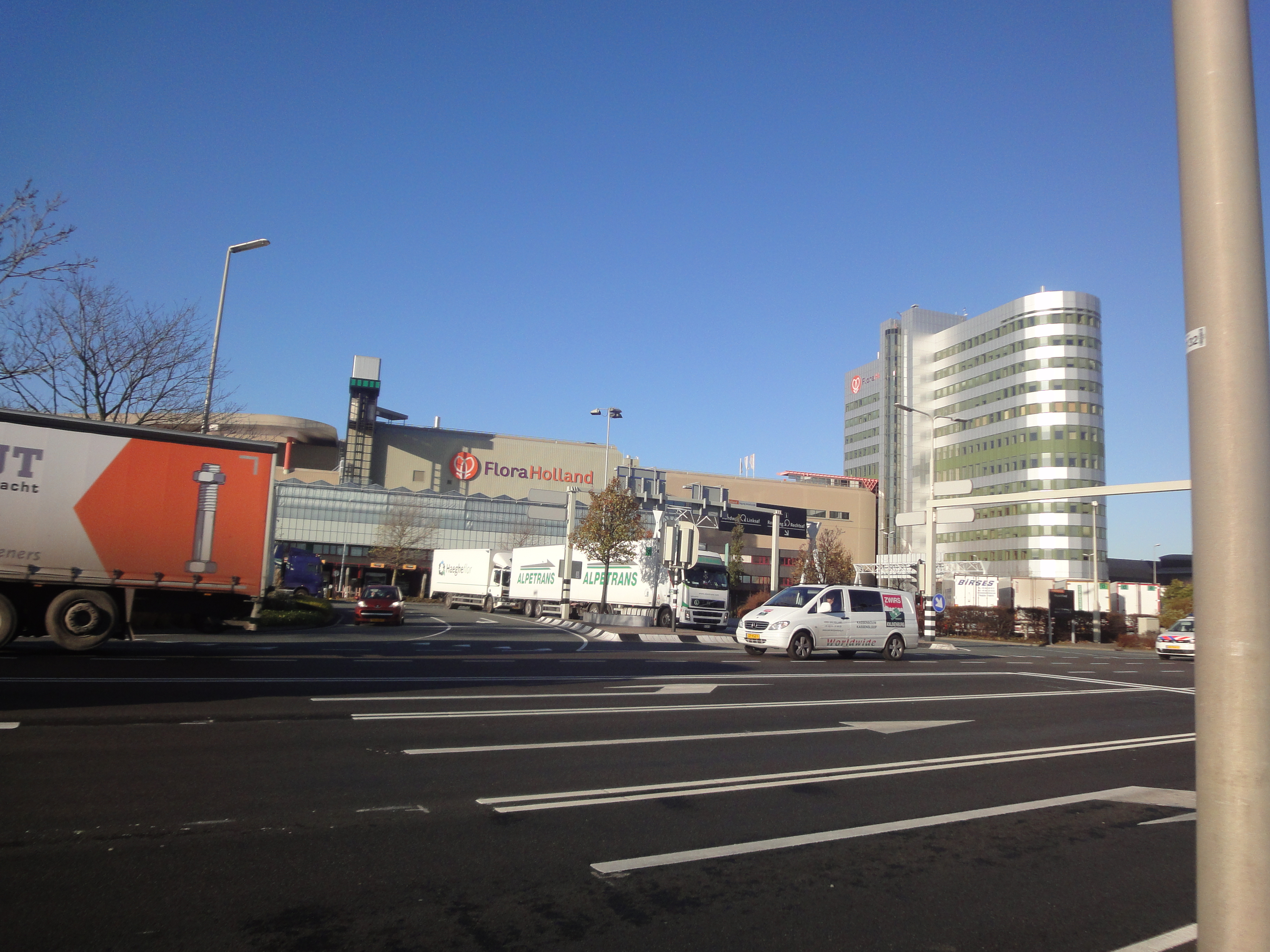
FloraHolland location in Naaldwijk.

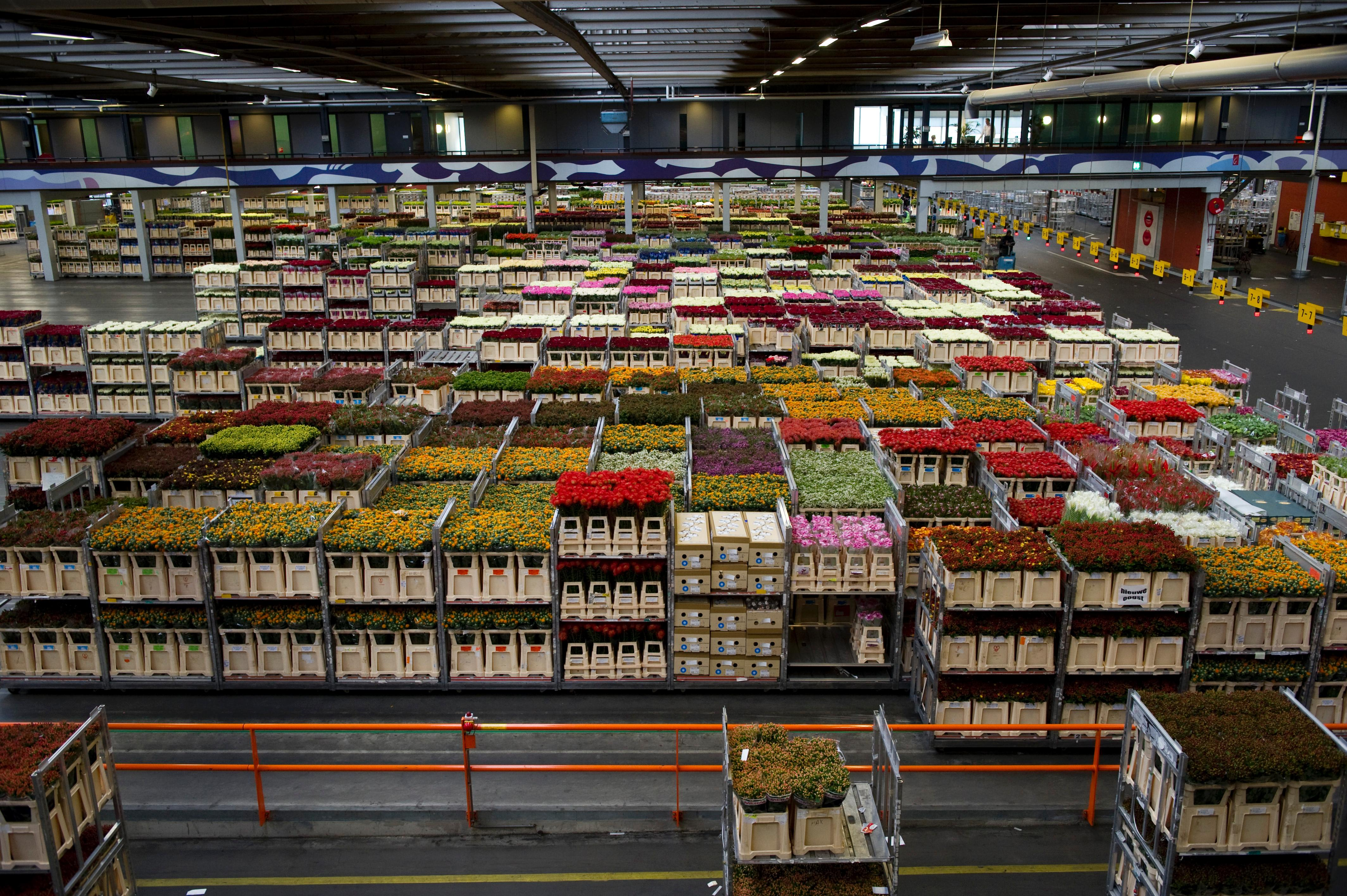
FloraHolland Naaldwijk assembly hall.

In response to the increased power of brokering, the flower growers in Aalsmeer joined forces. The auction in Bloemenlust was founded in late December 1911, "the auction of export flowers will take place in Café Welcome". In addition, the Central Aalsmeer Auction was launched on 5 January 1912. Five days later, in the pub Three Columns, the first flowers appeared at the clock. Both auctions saw their sales grow annually. In 1918, the Central Aalsmeer Auction achieved, for the first time, annual sales of 1 million guilders.

With flower and plant exports booming, the industry desperately needed to expand to a new auction complex with ample space. Against this background, it was decided to merge the auctions of Bloemenlust and Central Aalsmeer Auction. The merger took effect on 6 March 1968. The organization continued as: Aalsmeer Flower Auction (Verenigde Bloemenveiling Aalsmeer or V.B.A.:United Flower Auction Aalsmeer).

In 1972, a new auction complex at Legmeerdijk came into use. The complex covered an area of nine hectares. Further expansion followed and in 1999, the Aalsmeer Flower Auction and its customers took the first parts of the VBA South into use. This is located on the other side of the provincial road N231. Seven years later the first known plans for VBA Oost were drawn up. VBA Oost has a size of 36 ha (89 acres). Construction started in 2009. The main auction building was constructed in 2007, and covers an area of approximately 860,000 m^{2} (9,300,000 sq ft) and is one of the largest indoor market building in the world.

Other important milestones were in 1973, when the VBA allowed suppliers to market their products through an agency and from 2006, when international membership was introduced and recognized. As the first auction in the world, Aalsmeer Flower Auction opened membership to international members; companies located in countries outside the EU (companies from EU member states were already allowed to be a member). After a short time, there were approximately one hundred international members.

=== Naaldwijk ===
On 2 March 1923, it was founded as the Central Westland Cut Association (C.W.S.). Revenue on the first auction day was fl. 304.59. The C.W.S. rented a building in Poeldijk. In 1923, about 75 growers were member of the auction. Auctioning was done in a single clock.

On 30 March 1931, the auction association decided to change into a cooperative. From that moment the auction is named Cooperative Central Westlandsche Cut Association (C.C.W.S.). It was decided to establish the auction at the Dijkweg in Honselersdijk, close to the town Naaldwijk.

In 1971, for the first time a small amount of foreign flowers were sold on the clock. In 1976, the bells were number seven and eight in use for the auctioning of potted plants. This came to an end when the auctioning of flowers and plants were on the same clock. In 1983, the name changed again, this time in C.C.W.S. Flower in the Westland municipality.

The auction remains in Honselersdijk, formerly a core center of the auction business, in the municipality of Naaldwijk (today part of Westland). The name Naaldwijk has so far not changed the Westland name.

=== Rijnsburg ===
In 1914, seventeen growers of Flower Flora established their auction in Rijnsburg, South Holland. In the beginning it was auctioned in the local pub. Only in 1917 a real auction building was inaugurated in Rijnsburg. Bulb flowers and especially tulips and lilies were important products for Flower Auction from its inception. Other flowers were auctioned from about 1927.

In 1980, the new auction complex was put into operation just outside Katwijk on the municipal boundary with Oegstgeest. Since the merger, it achieved most of the sales in the Rijnsburgse establishment of bulbous flowers, also in comparison with the other branches.

=== Bleiswijk ===
In 1928, the 'Rotterdamsche Vegetable Auction' was established. It auctioned vegetables for the first time, and later it auctioned flowers. A year later it built a separate auction in Berkel for the auction of flowers and the name was changed into Cooperative Fruit and Flower Berkel en Rodenrijs. In 1973, the RVA merged with the vegetable department ‘’Tuinbouwveiling’’ in Rotterdam. Auctioning of flowers continued under the name Flower Berkel and Environs. In 1982, the auction building was moved to the Klappolder in Bleiswijk, South Holland. In 2014, this auction has been closed due to fact that the auction operations have been moved to Naaldwijk department. The facility is maintained as a logistics center for distribution.

=== Venlo ===
In 1915, the Cooperative Auction-Vereeniging (CVV) in Blerick, Limburg, was founded by the local farmers. At that time only fruits and vegetables were auctioned. From 1916, eggs were added into the auction. Selling flowers through the CVV began in 1962, when a Chrysanthemums grower reported at the auction. His flowers were auctioned at the vegetable clock, at that time there was no clock for flowers. Later, many farmers started growing flowers instead of vegetables and fruits.

After a year, as many flowers already were auctioned on CVV, a separate flower auction hall was built in Grubbenvorst. This is where the Venlo department is still located. The new auction complex was opened in 1965. On 30 April 1969, the building was destroyed by fire and the sales went into a vegetable auction hall. A few years later, a new auction and distribution building was completed at the location of the earlier flower hall.

After several mergers, in 1991 the CVV auction merged with the Cooperative Venlo Vegetable Auction. They continued under the name Cooperative Auction Southeast Netherlands (abbreviated Auction ZON). On July 1, 2002, the floral part of Auction ZON joined FloraHolland.

=== Eelde ===
In 1927, the first flowers were auctioned in the north of the Netherlands, in the city of Groningen. The auction was called Flower 's North. The auction has twice changed address in Groningen, in 1936 and in 1948. In January 1978, the auction moved to Eelde, a town just 8 km (5 mi) south of that city.

== See also ==
- Dutch flower bucket
