= Dove (band) =

Australian soft rock band

- Origin: Melbourne, Victoria, Australia
- Genres: Soft rock
- Years active: 1973–1978
- Labels: Sunrise/WEA; Image; Crystal Clear
- Past members: Sharyn Cambridge; Steve Gill; Jim Sifonios; Warwick Thomas; Ian Kinkead; Lloyd Poole

Dove were an Australian soft rock band, which formed in 1973 and disbanded in 1978. They comprised Sharyn Cambridge on lead vocals, Steve Gill on drums, percussion and vocals, Jim Sifonios on guitar, keyboards and vocals and Warwick Thomas on bass guitar and vocals. The group released three albums, Magic to Do (1974), Love Harmony and Understanding (1975) and Dove (1976).

== History ==
Dove were formed in Melbourne as a soft rock band in 1973 by Sharyn Cambridge on lead vocals, Steve Gill on drums, percussion and vocals, Jim Sifonios on guitar, keyboards and vocals and Warwick Thomas on bass guitar and vocals. The four members had attended the same secondary school. The group were signed to Sunrise Records, which was distributed by WEA Records. Their debut single, "It Might as Well Rain Until September" appeared in August 1973 and is a cover version of Carole King's 1962 track. This was followed in November 1973 by their rendition of the Beach Boys' 1964 hit, "Little Honda".

Dove issued their debut album, Magic to Do, in 1974. It provided two more singles, "Magic to Do" (May 1974) and "Amazing Grace" (November). "Magic to Do" is from the Broadway musical, Pippin (1972), which had an Australian version begin its run in February 1974 at Melbourne's Her Majesty's Theatre. Dove's "Magic to Do" also appeared on a Various Artists' four-track extended play, Hits from Pippin (1974). Sunrise/WEA issued two more cover versions, "Play Something Sweet" (December 1974) original by Sylvester and "Just One Look" (July 1975) previously by Doris Troy.

After signing to Image Records, Dove released their second album, Love Harmony and Understanding (1975), which provided the singles, "Let's Hang On" (December 1975) and "The Lion Sleeps Tonight (April 1976) – the latter was originally by Solomon Linda in 1939. The Album was produced by Ian Miller and recorded at Crystal Clear Sound, South Melbourne.

By 1976 the quartet had signed to Crystal Clear Records and issued their third album, Dove, which included a single, "Gotta Get Away" (July). During recording the album, Gill was replaced on drums by Ian Kinkead. Unlike their previous albums, this had seven of its ten tracks as originals. A reviewer from Papua New Guinea Post-Courier described the album as having "the friendly warmth" but "much more polish and panache" than their earlier ones. The group disbanded in 1978. Cambridge undertook a solo career and later teamed with Colin Stephen to form Sharyn Cambridge–Colin Who Band.

== Discography ==
=== Albums ===
- Magic to Do (1974) – Sunrise Records/WEA Records (SUN-LP-2, MX173334-MX173335)
- Love Harmony and Understanding (1975) – Image Records (ILP-751)
- Dove (1976) Crystal Clear Records (CCSA–061)

=== Singles ===
- "It Might as Well Rain Until September" (1973)
- "Little Honda" (1973)
- "Magic to Do" (1974)
- "Amazing Grace" (1974)
- "Play Something Sweet" (1974)
- "Just One Look" (1975)
- "Let's Hang On" (1975)
- "The Lion Sleeps Tonight (1976)
- "Gotta Get Away" (1976)
