= Dutch flower bucket =

Flower transport container

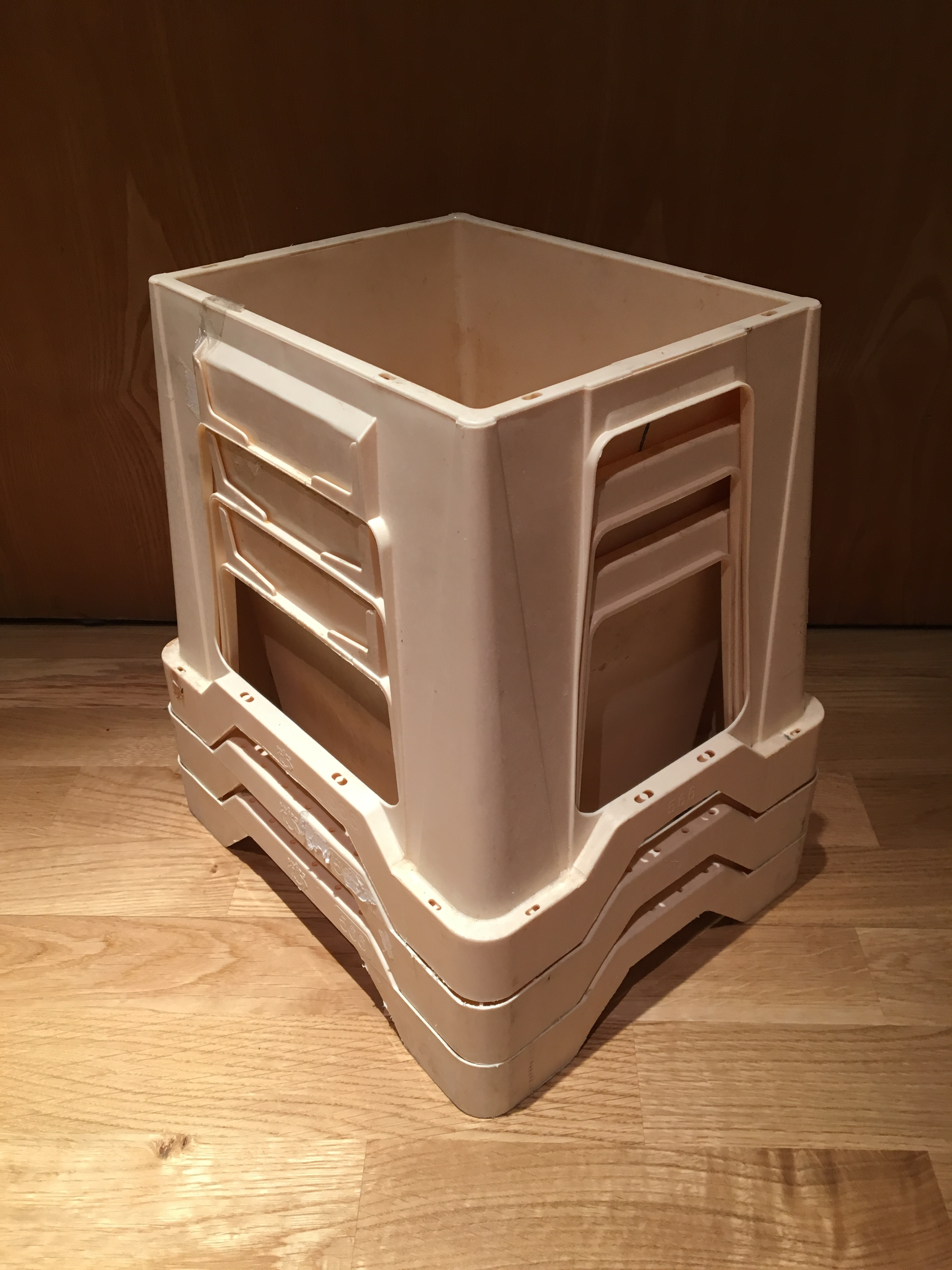
- Type: Vase
- Manufacturer: Royal FloraHolland
- Models: Fc577, Fc588, Fc998

A Dutch flower bucket is the most common container employed in the European floral industry to transport flowers. It is also used to keep them watered in transit.

== Overview ==
It is a patented design from Royal FloraHolland, a Dutch conglomerate of florists. The bucket is made of hard plastic, making it stackable, and comes in three main sizes.

All flowers exported by truck from the Netherlands to the main continental European countries and the United Kingdom are delivered to customers via Dutch buckets stored on trolleys. The bucket is only temporarily borrowed, and an inventory of quantities delivered to each shop is kept. The empty bucket is expected to be collected by the truck driver on the return voyage. If it is not returned, a fee is charged.

Unlike other shipping devices, such as pallets and TEU containers, the Dutch bucket is not considered a unit of measurement, and flowers are not sold or purchased based on quantities of buckets delivered. The European network of flower shops has benefited from the usage of a common container tool, and the Dutch bucket has been considered a "standard" since the early 2000s.

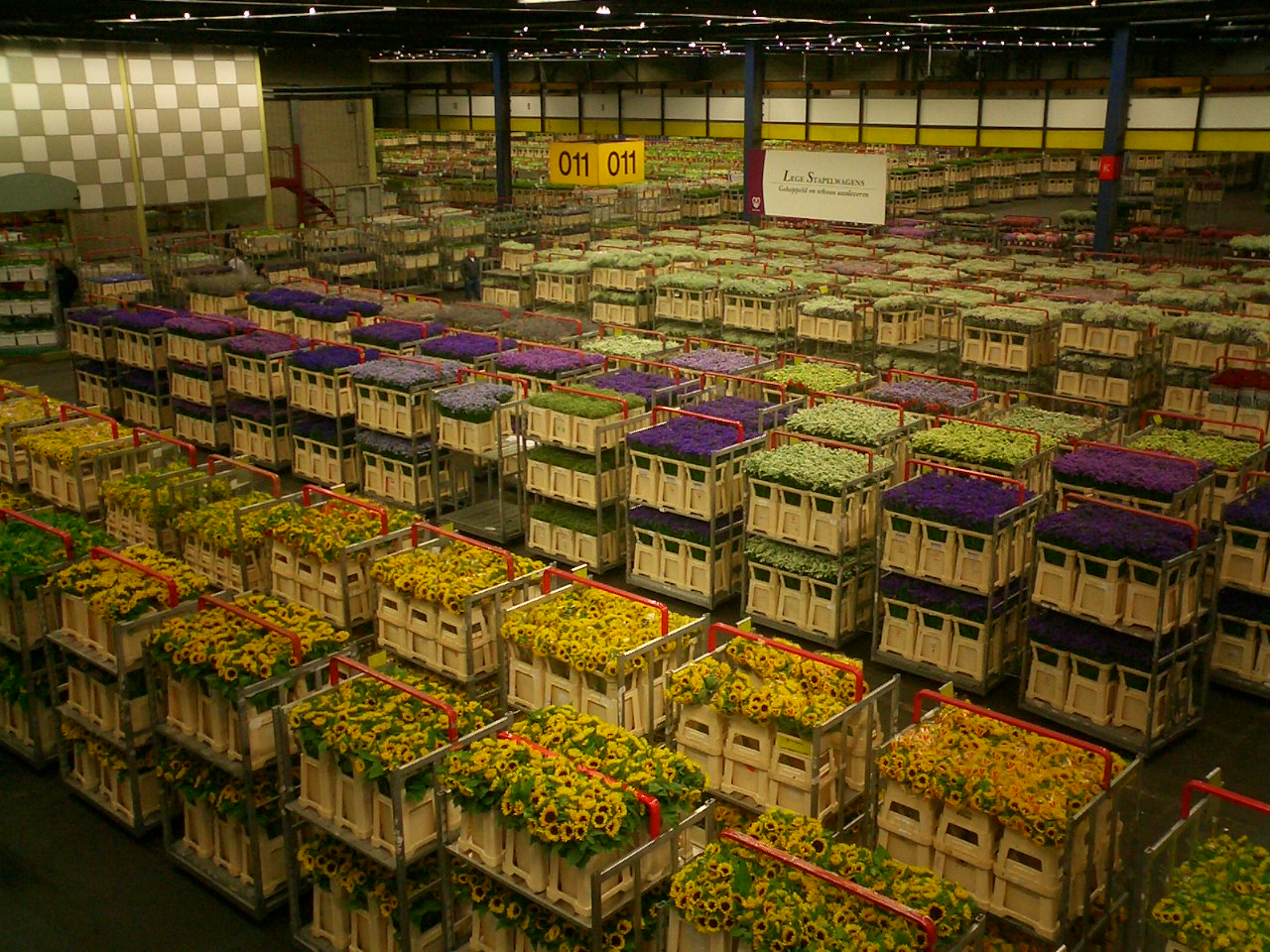
Cut flowers in Dutch flower buckets at the Royal FloraHolland headquarters in Aalsmeer.

== See also ==
- Flower delivery – Service in floristry
- Flowerpot – Container in pottery or plastic in which flowers and plants are held
- Royal FloraHolland – Dutch florist conglomerate
- Cut flowers – Flowers or buds harvested for decoration
- Dutch auction – Type of auction which begins with a high asking price, and lowers it
- Intermediate bulk container – Industrial-grade storage and transport container for fluids and solids
- Bulk box – Pallet-size shipping box
