= Aalsmeer Flower Auction =

Horticultural event in the Netherlands

Coordinates: 52°15′40.36″N 4°46′52.32″E

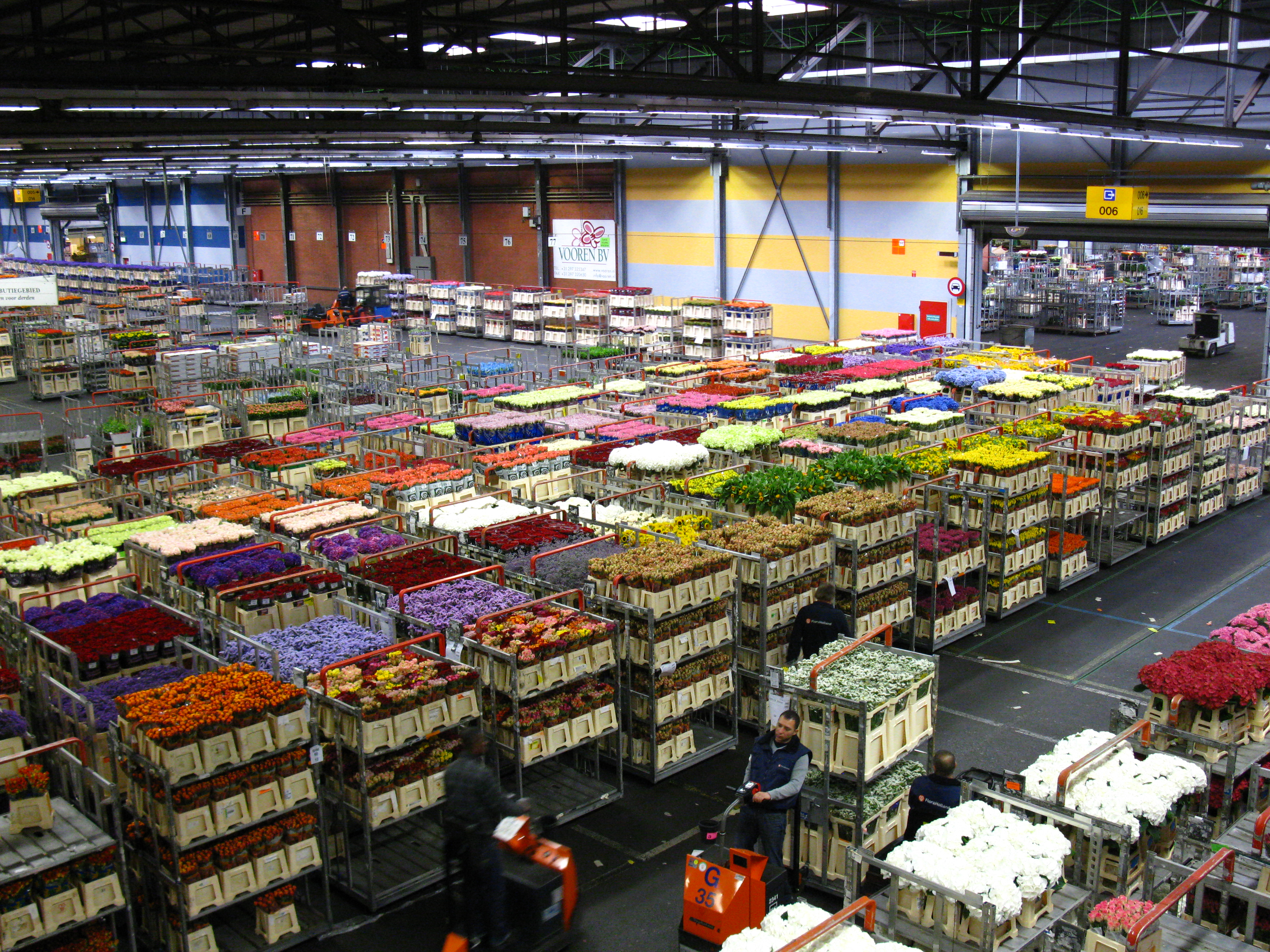
Aalsmeer Flower Auction

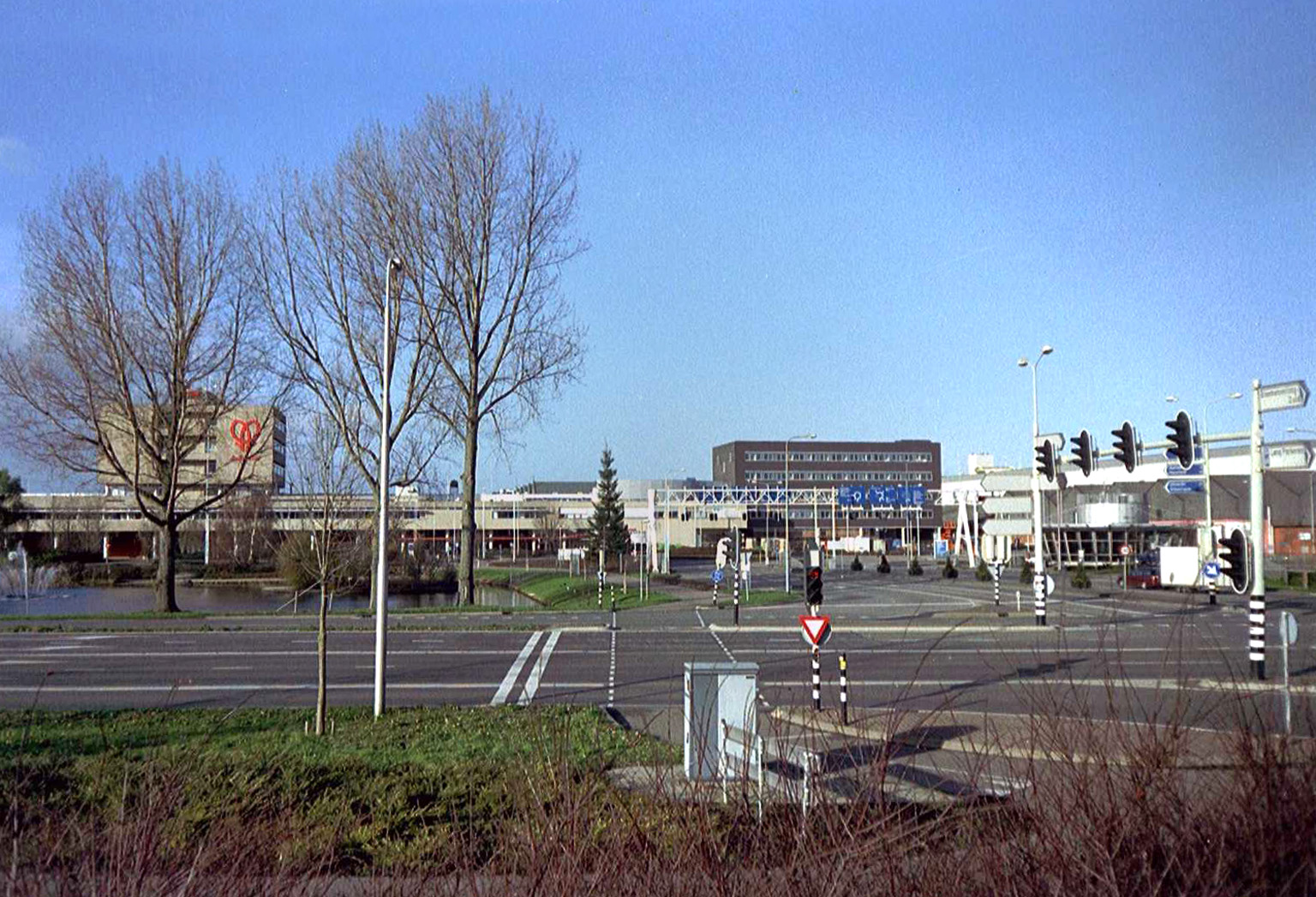
Part of the buildings at the Aalsmeer Flower Auction

Aalsmeer Flower Auction (Bloemenveiling Aalsmeer) is a flower market based in Aalsmeer, Netherlands. It is the largest flower auction in the world. The Aalsmeer Flower Auction building is the ninth largest building by floor area in the world, covering 999,000 square metres (10,750,000 sq ft; 247 acres). Flowers from all over the world — Europe, Israel, Ecuador, Colombia, Ethiopia, Kenya, and other countries — are traded every day in this gigantic building. Around 43 million flowers are sold daily. This increases by around 15 percent around special days such as Valentine's Day and Mother's Day. Their flowers are subjected to around 30 quality checks so that they can be graded on a scale (A1, A2 and B).

The auction is set up as a Dutch auction in which the price starts high and works its way down. Bidders get only a few seconds to bid on the flowers before they are sold and passed on to the new owner. On 1 January 2008, the auction company merged with its biggest competitor Royal FloraHolland.

In 2021 the organiser of the auction, Royal Flora Holland, acquired three companies that specialise in the transportation of flowers and plants: De Winter, Van Marrewijk (Wematrans) and Van Zaal. They were combined into a new transportation company called Floriway.
