= Eleanor Bodel =

- Born: Bodil Ellinor Olsson; July 6, 1948 (age 78); Nacka, Sweden
- Occupation: Singer
- Years active: 1968–1972

Bodil Ellinor Olsson (born July 6, 1948), known as Eleanor Bodel; Swedish: [ˈeːlɛnɔr ˈbʊdɛl]; is a Swedish pop singer who began performing in public in 1968 with the orchestra of Bruno Glenmark and from 1969 as a solo artist. Of her hits, "Sunday Will Never Be the Same" (1968), "One Way Ticket" on the list Tio i topp written by Neil Sedaka (1969), and a cover of Del Shannon's "Keep Searchin'" (1969) remained in the Top Ten charts for several weeks and also reached number one. In 1969, she also topped the Svensktoppen charts for four weeks with the song "Jag önskar att det alltid vore sommar", a Swedish-language version of "It Might as Well Rain Until September", composed by Gerry Goffin and Carole King, with lyrics in Swedish partially written by herself.

Bodel ended her pop career in 1972 and moved to Nordmaling, where she has worked with singer Maria Pereboom, better known as "Suzie," managed a restaurant and hospital organization room and was locally active with the Swedish Social Democracy Party and the Kultur för seniorer. Kultur och hälsa." ("Culture for Seniors. Culture and Health.") project.
