= Lisbet Jagedal =

- Born: 17 July 1964 (age 62)
- Genres: dansband music, schlager
- Occupation: Singer
- Years active: 1989–present

Lisbet Jagedal (born 17 July 1964), is a Swedish singer who participated at Melodifestivalen 1990 with the song Varje natt which ended up third.

She has also scored Svensktoppen hits as a solo singer with the song "Varje natt" (1990) as well as together with Pools orkester; "Du har det där" (1993) and "För varje andetag" (1994).
