= Tank container =

Object for transportation

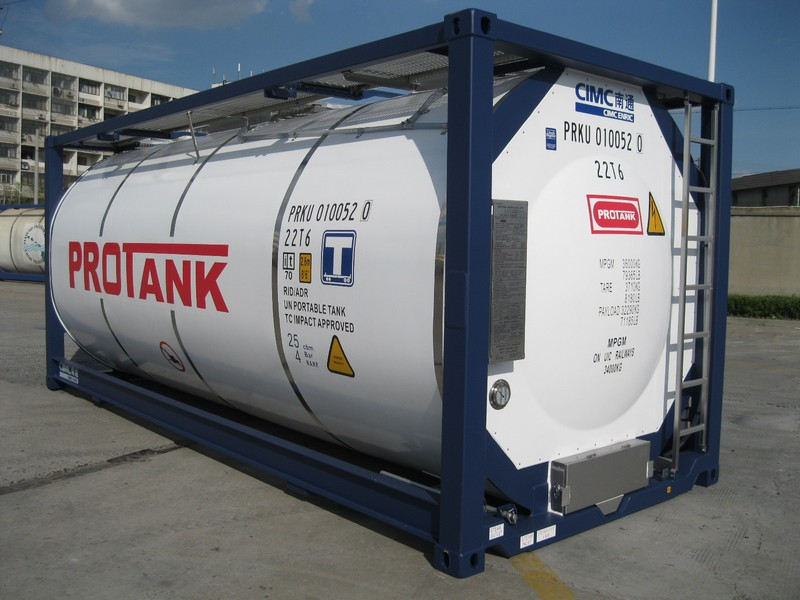
Universal tank container

A tank container, tanktainer, or ISOtainer is an intermodal container for the transport of liquids, gases and powders as bulk cargo. It is built to the ISO standards, making it suitable for different modes of transportation; as such, it is also called an ISO tank. Both hazardous and non-hazardous products can be transported in tank containers.

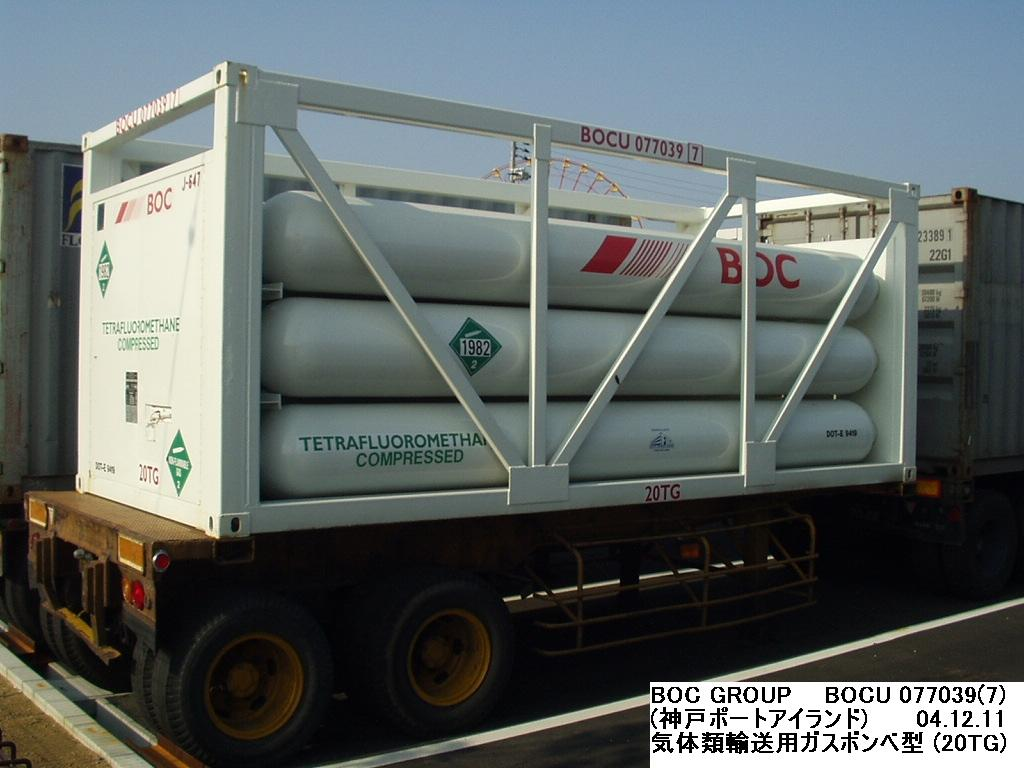
Gas containers sometimes have multiple bottles instead of one large tank.

A tank container is a vessel of stainless steel surrounded by an insulation and protective layer of usually polyurethane and aluminum. The vessel is in the middle of a steel frame. The frame is made according to ISO standards and is 19.8556 feet (6.05 meters) long, 7.874 feet (2.40 meters) wide and 7.874 feet (2.40 meters) or 8.374 feet (2.55 meters) high. The contents of the tank range from 17,500 to 26,000 liters (3,800 to 5,700 imp gal; 4,600 to 6,900 U.S. gal). There are both smaller and larger tank containers, which usually have a size different from the ISO standard sizes. For example, there are some 27,000 liters (5,900 imp gal; 7,100 U.S. gal) and above litre tank containers in the European swap body fleets in Europe but they are not used on international business only on intra European traffic. The trade organization ITCO estimates that as of January 1, 2024, the global fleet of tank containers stands at 848,400 units. Most of these tank containers are owned by operators and leasing companies.

ISO tank containers built to transport hazardous cargo have to meet a variety of regulations including but not limited to IMDG, ADR-RID- US DOT and other. There are a variety of UN Portable tank types, the most common of which is T11 as it is permitted to transport a thousand or more hazardous bulk chemicals.

There are hundreds of tank container operators worldwide; they can vary on the service they offer. The bigger operators typically offer a wide range of services, while smaller operators may only offer services in one region or with one type of tank.

== History ==
The tank container concept was also employed in Europe by Bob Fossey, an engineer who worked for Williams Fairclough in London. They improved on the 1950s framed American elliptical container tanks, oft noted carrying specified USA engine oils for the UK’s MoD aircraft built in Preston, Lancashire. In 1964, Fairclough made a swap body tank for combined transport by truck and train, but not yet constructed according to ISO standards. In 1966, commercial production began and one year later the first tank container to ISO dimensions was developed. The first mass-produced tank containers were purchased by Trafpak, a part of Pakhoed.

In 1969, the ISOTANK was registered as a trade name by Andrews of Aintree Ltd., Liverpool. These were the first ISO container tanks in the world to be granted Lloyds Register and the UK DoT Hazardous Goods Department design approvals for international transport. Containers were tested at Ellis Research facility. George Lambert, the ISOTANK’S designer, was also the company’s division head, thus responsible for sales or advising clients on the new product’s wide range of complex issues.

This first order to Andrews came from a major shipping line entering the bulk sensitive liquids by ISO means. It was reported as won by merit of the approved data and reputation. The initial order was for 20 insulated and electrically heated units, 10 for hazardous substances, and 10 for non- hazardous substances.

In the early 1970s, the tank container evolved to its current form and the production was also well underway. In the early days, production took place in Europe. In 2010 and afterward, production is mainly in China and South Africa.

== Handling ==
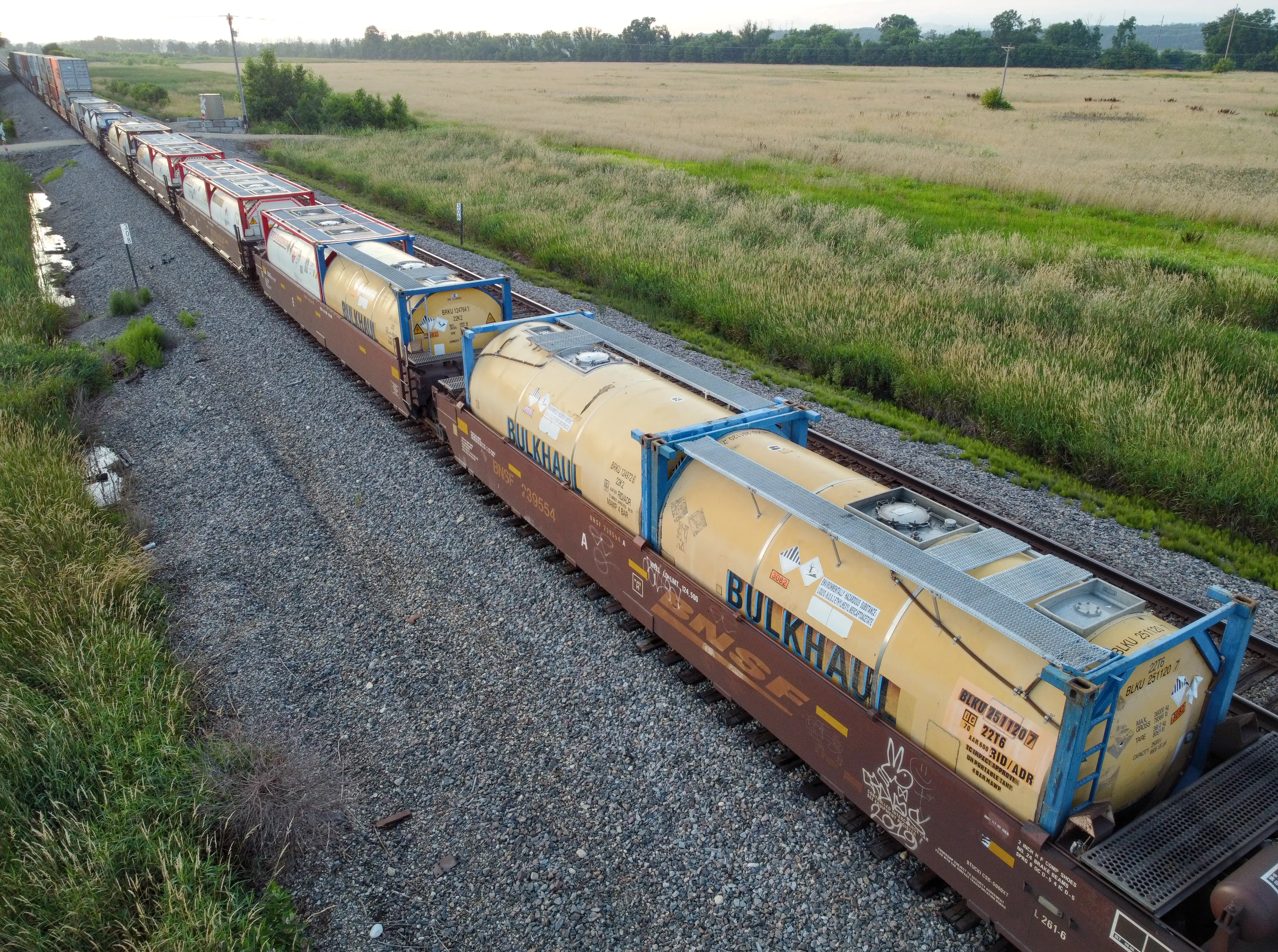
20 foot tank containers in 40 foot well cars

A tank container can be loaded and unloaded from the top and the bottom. On a standard tank container there is a manhole, at least one valve on the top, and there is a valve at the bottom. Loading and unloading is done by connecting hoses of the loading and unloading facility to the valves of the tank. The loading or unloading is often done using a pump. Depending on the installation and regulation of certain products, it is determined how the tank container should be loaded or unloaded.

== Types ==
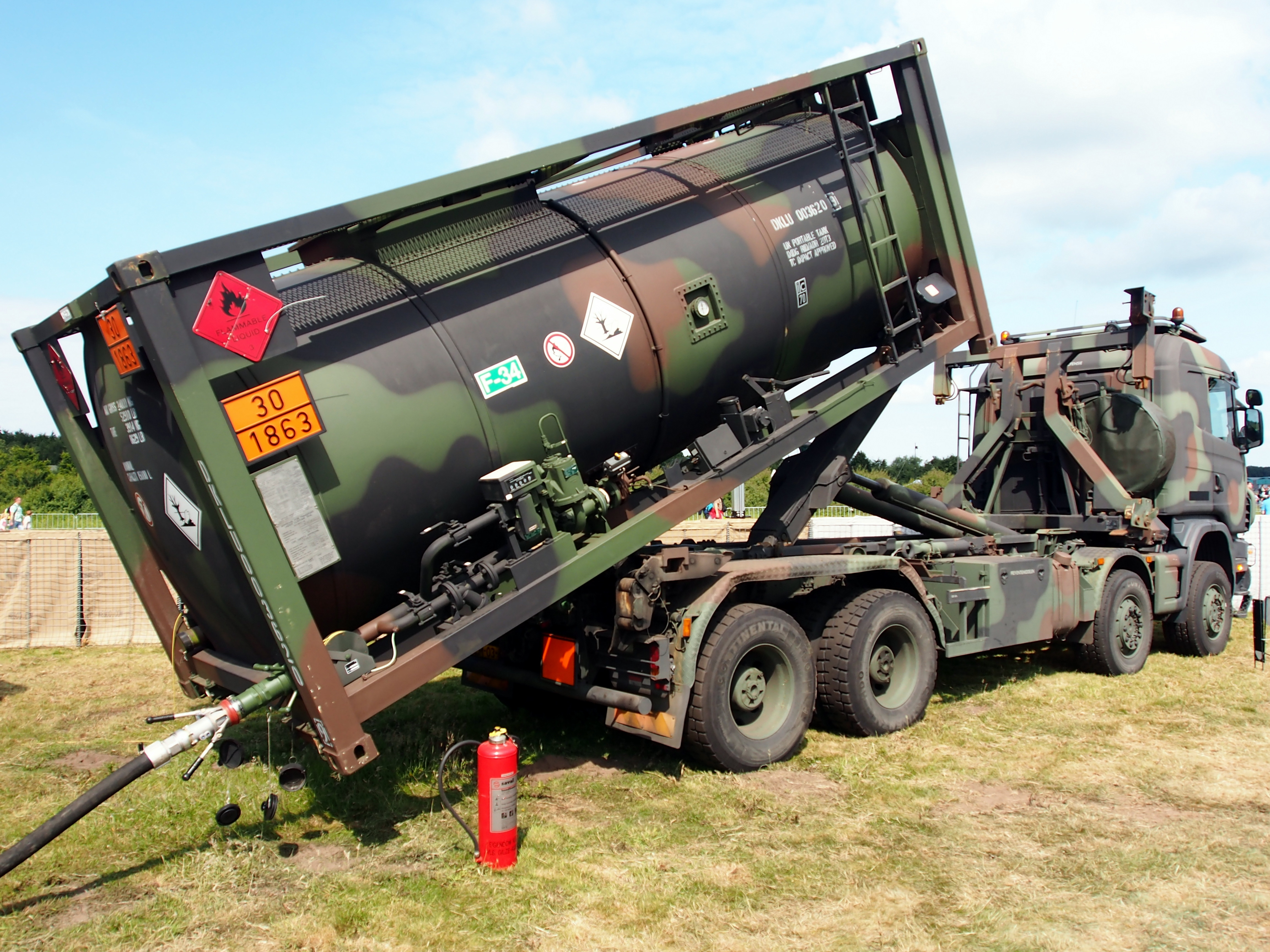
Military use of a tank container system.

- Swap body tank - a swap body has a bigger tank which is larger than the frame, usually 23 or 25 feet (7.01 or 7.62 meters) long
- Food-grade tank - a standard tank container which can only be loaded with foodgrade products
- Reefer tank - a tank with the ability to cool ("refigerate") the product to be transported
- Gas tank - a tank that is suitable for the transport of gases
- Silo tank - a tank for the transport of grains and powders
- T1 ISO tank container (for wine and light liquids)
- T4 ISO tank container (for non-hazardous edible and non-edible oils)
- T11 ISO tank container (for non-hazardous chemicals)
- T14 ISO tank container (for hazardous chemicals and acids like HCl and zinc chloride)
- T20/T22 ISO tank container (for highly toxic, reactive, or hazardous liquids such as titanium tetrachloride)
- T50 ISO tank container (for compressed gasses such as LPG and ammonia)
- T75 ISO tank container ( for Cryogenic liquids )
- SWAP tank container (for cargo above 26,000 to 32,000 metric tons or 25,600 to 31,500 long tons or 28,700 to 35,300 short tons)
- Rubber-lined ISO tank container (for acid-based chemicals)

== Competitive modes ==
- Barrel
- Intermediate bulk container
- Tanker
- Tank chassis
- Tank truck
- Tank wagon

== See also ==
- Liquid hydrogen tanktainer
- Tank chassis
