= Pools orkester =

- Origin: Sweden
- Genres: dansband music
- Years active: late 20th century
- Past members: Lisbet Jagedal

Pools orkester was a dansband from Sweden. The band scored successes by the early 1990s when Lisbet Jagedal used to sing with the band.

== Discography ==
=== Albums ===
- "Lisbet Jagedal & Pools orkester" - 1990
- "Himlen är nära" - 1994

== Svensktoppen songs ==
- "Du har det där" - 1993
- "För varje andetag" - 1994
