= Flexible intermediate bulk container =

Industrial container

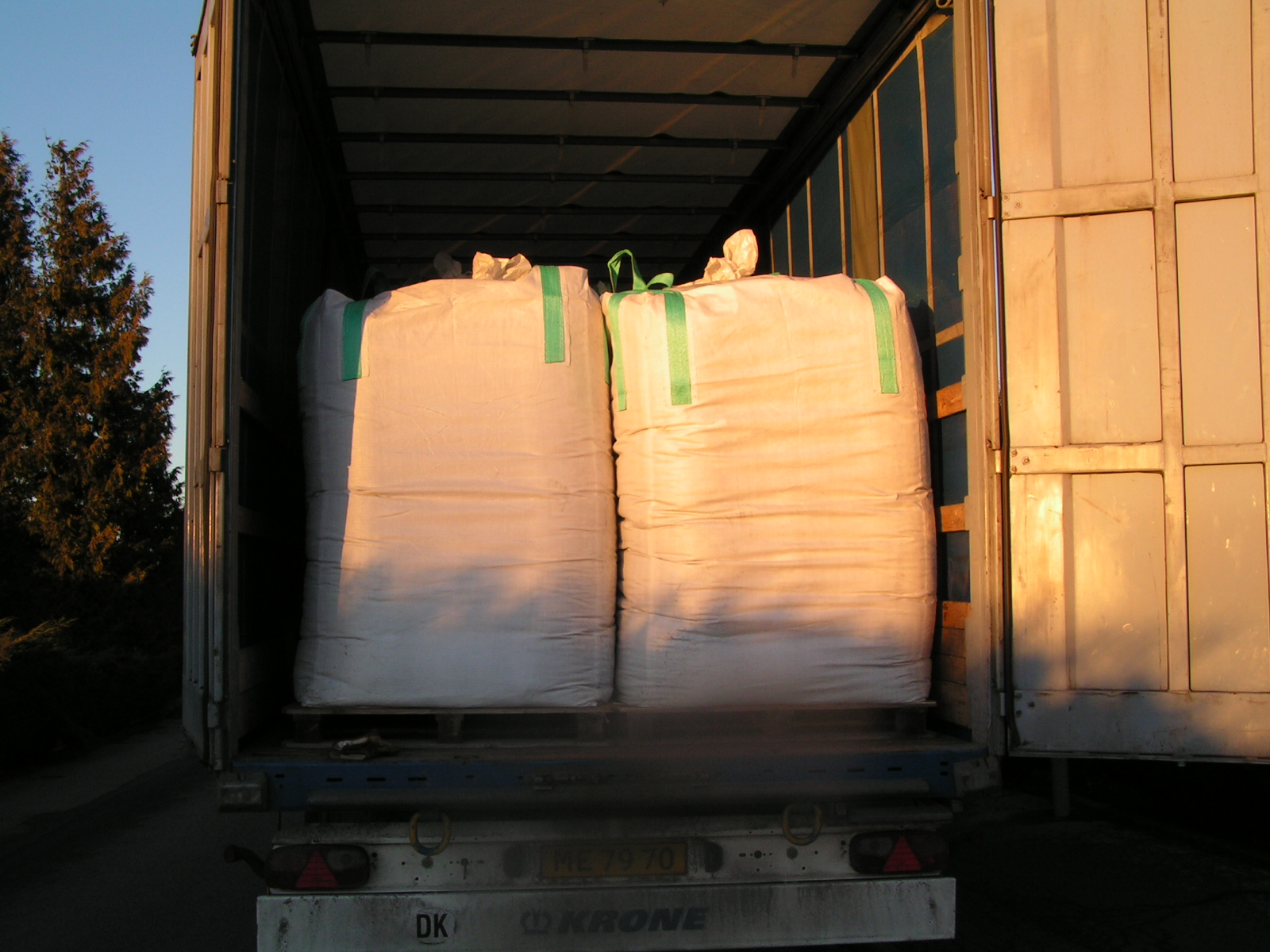
Big bags

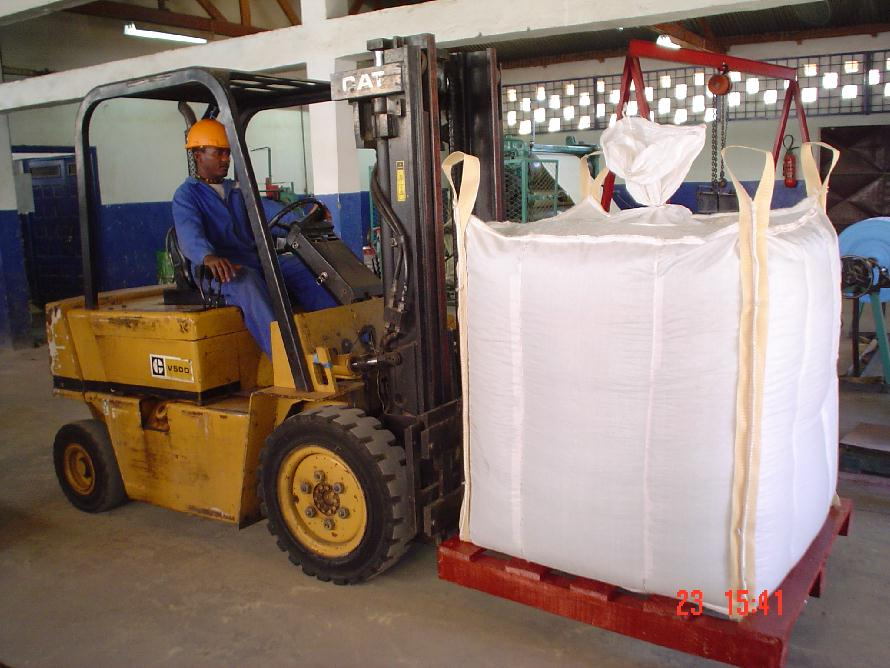
FIBC

A flexible intermediate bulk container (FIBC), builder's bag, jumbo bag, bulk bag, dumpy bag, super sack or a big bag is an industrial container made of flexible fabric that is designed for storing and transporting dry, flowable products, such as sand, fertilizer, and granules of plastic.

FIBCs are most often made of thick woven strands of oriented polypropylene, either coated or uncoated, and normally measure around 45–48 inches (114–122 cm) in diameter and varies in height from 100 to 200 cm (39 to 79 inches). Its capacity is normally around 1,000 kg or 2,200 lb, but the larger units can store even more. A FIBC designed to transport one metric ton (0.98 long tons; 1.1 short tons) of material will itself only weigh 5–7 lb (2.3–3.2 kg).

Transporting and loading is done on either pallets or by lifting it from the loops. Bags are made with either one, two, or four lifting loops. The single loop bag is suitable for one-man operation as there is no need for a second man to put the loops on the loader hook. The bags are emptied via a special opening in the bottom such as a discharge spout, of which there are several options, or by cutting it open.

== History ==
Although there is disagreement on exactly where FIBCs were first made and used, it is certain that they have been employed for a variety of packaging purposes since the 1940s. These forerunners of the FIBC as we know it today were manufactured from PVC rubber and generally utilized within the rubber industry for the transportation of carbon black to be used as a reinforcing agent in a variety of rubber products.

By the 1960s, with the development of polypropylene combined with advances in weaving, the bulk bags as we know them today came into being and were rapidly adopted by a wide variety of oil and chemical companies to store and transport powdered and granular products.

It was during the oil crisis of the mid-1970s that the FIBC really came into its own for transporting huge quantities of cement to the Middle East from across Europe for the rapid expansion of the oil producing countries. At its zenith, upwards of 50,000 metric tons (49,000 long tons; 55,000 short tons) of cement was being shipped out on a weekly basis to feed the vast building program.

== Manufacturing ==
The manufacturing process of FIBC bags is a multi-stage process that involves transforming raw polypropylene (PP) into a finished, tested bulk bag.

=== Raw Material ===
The primary material is polypropylene (PP), a versatile polymer chosen for its strength, durability, and cost-effectiveness. The process begins with PP resin, a granulated raw material, which is often mixed with additives (e.g., UV stabilizers for outdoor use or antistatic agents for safe handling of flammable materials) during a compounding step.

=== Tape Extrusion ===
The compounded PP is melted and extruded through a flat die to create a thin film. This film is then stretched orientedly (a process known as tape extrusion) to form high-tensile tape yarn. This orienting process aligns the polymer molecules, significantly increasing the yarn's strength-to-weight ratio.

=== Weaving ===
The tape yarn is wound onto large bobbins and fed into circular or flat loom weaving machines. Here, it is woven into a durable fabric, typically in a plain weave pattern. The fabric is produced as a continuous tube, known as circular woven fabric, which naturally forms the body of the bag without side seams, enhancing strength and reducing potential failure points.

=== Lamination (if applicable) ===
For bags requiring moisture or dust containment, a multi-layer laminate film (e.g., PP woven fabric with a polyethylene or polypropylene film layer) is produced using extrusion lamination. The laminate is then cut to size.

=== Cutting and Printing ===
The large rolls of woven fabric (or laminate) are cut into panels of specific dimensions according to the bag design. These panels are then printed with product information, safety warnings, logos, and handling symbols using flexographic printing.

=== Sewing and Assembly ===
The cut panels are sewn together by industrial sewing machines using high-strength PP or polyester thread. This process constructs the main body, adds lifting loops, and creates the discharge spout (if applicable). Critical seams, especially those for lifting loops, are often double-stitched or reinforced with webbing for safety.

=== Quality Control and Testing ===
Throughout the manufacturing process, quality control checks are performed. The final bags are subject to testing, often following standards set by organizations like the Flexible Intermediate Bulk Container Association (FIBCA) and International Organization for Standardization (ISO). Key tests include:

- Top Lift Test: Filling a bag to its safe working load (SWL) and lifting it by its loops.
- Stacking Test: Simulating stacked storage conditions to check load stability.
- Drop Test: Assessing the durability of the bag and its seams when dropped from a specified height with controlled content.

Bags that pass testing are then compressed, bundled, and palletized for shipping.

== See also ==
- Intermediate bulk container
- Reusable shopping bag
- Sustainable packaging
- Geotextile
- Packaging
