= Intermediate bulk container =

Industrial-grade storage and transport container for fluids and solids

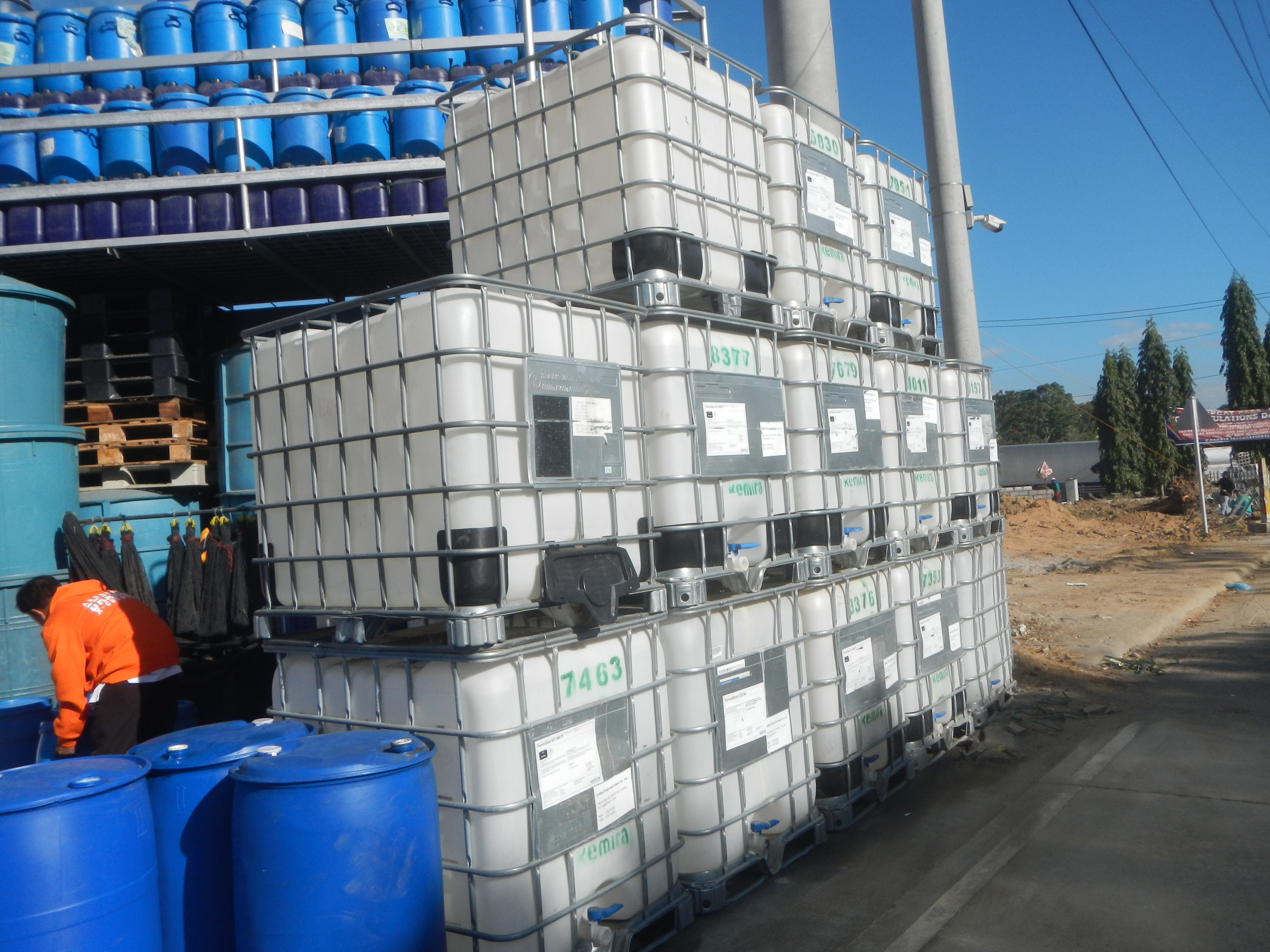
A stack of intermediate bulk containers

Intermediate bulk containers (also known as IBCs, IBC totes, or pallet tanks) are industrial-grade containers engineered for the mass handling, transport, and storage of liquids, partial solids, pastes, granular solids or other fluids. The magnitude of size of typically 1000 liter is intermediate between barrel or drum and mostly immobile storage tanks or tank containers moved by trucks and railway. IBCs can be handled by a single person with a pallet jack, and stacked with a fork lift if rigid.

The IBC was developed and patented in 1993 by Olivier J. L. D’Hollander, who worked at Dow Corning.

There are several types of IBCs with the two main categories being flexible IBCs and rigid IBCs. Many IBCs are reused with proper cleaning and reconditioning or repurposed.

IBCs are roughly pallet-sized and either attach to a pallet or have integral pallet handling features. This type of packaging is frequently certified for transporting dangerous goods or hazardous materials. Proper shipment requires the IBC to comply with all applicable regulations.

== Types ==
=== Rigid IBC ===
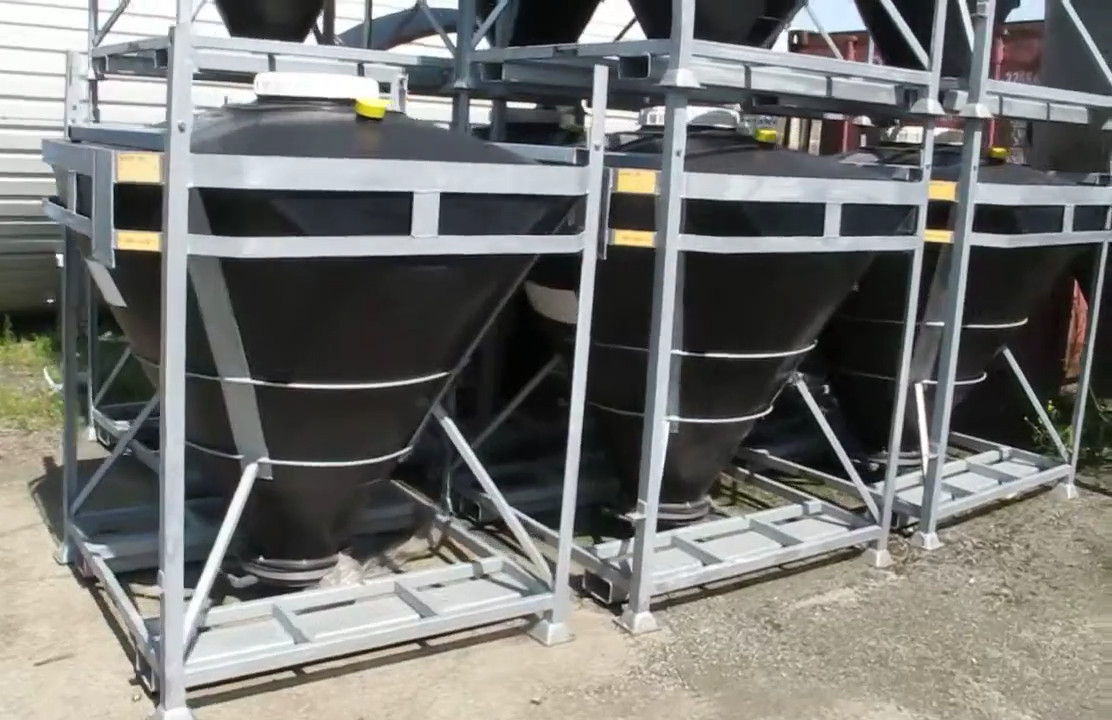
Stackable 1,000 L (260 US gal) rigid powder IBCs (MDPE, steel)

Rigid intermediate bulk containers are a type of bulk box. They can be reusable, versatile containers with an integrated pallet base mount that provides forklift and pallet jack maneuverability. These containers can be made from metal, plastic, or a composite construction of the two materials. Rigid IBC design types are manufactured across a volume range that is in between those of standard shipping drums and intermodal tank containers, hence the title "intermediate" bulk container. In the USA, IBC totes are authorized per Title 49 CFR codes to be fabricated of a volume up to 3 m^{3} (793 US gal) while maintaining the IBC name and their federal shipping and handling permits. Many rigid IBCs are designed to be stackable.

Containers for hazardous and dangerous fluids must carry UN-recognized markings that enable the operator and those handling the container to ensure suitability with the contained cargo and associated handling requirements.

IBC tank capacities generally used are often 1,040 and 1,250 L (275 and 330 US gal). Intermediate bulk containers are standardized shipping containers often UN/DOT certified for the transport handling of hazardous and non-hazardous, packing group II and packing group III commodities. Many IBC totes are manufactured according to federal and NSF/ANSI regulations and mandates and are often IMDG approved as well for domestic and maritime transport. Metal alloy IBC tanks are also manufactured according to NFPA and UL142 certification standards for extensive storage of materials labelled as flammable and/or combustible.

Intermediate bulk containers can be manufactured from various materials based on the requirements of the application or service the IBC will be used for. Traditional materials include:

- Plastic (high-density polyethylene)
- Composite: galvanized steel and plastic
- Carbon steel
- Stainless steel (304 and 316/316L grades)

=== Collapsible IBC ===
Collapsible IBC tanks are designed so that they can be folded when needed to save space when empty or used for return transport. They can also be stacked to save storage space. The replaceable plastic bags with a typical volume of 500 or 1,000 L (130 or 260 US gal) make the container easy to clean and reuse, which is needed for use with food, as strict hygiene regulations must be observed. The space-saving intermediate bulk containers are used in the pharmaceutical, cosmetics and food industries. Several designed have been developed.

=== Caged IBC ===
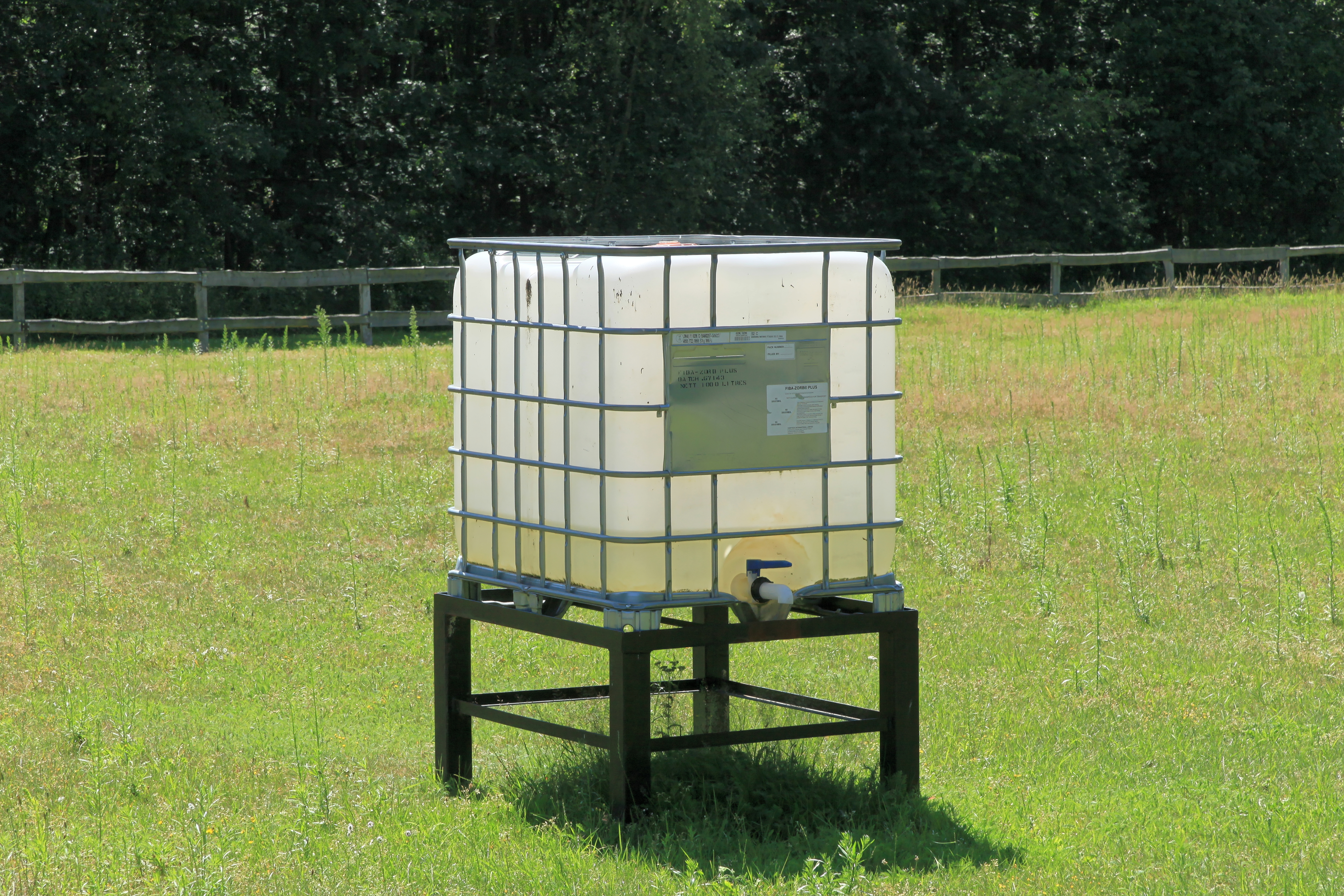
Caged IBC on a dispensing stand

Caged IBCs are composite structures and are in very common usage. Caged IBCs are often utilized as one-use containers, especially when it comes to hazardous materials, but are also suitable for cleaning and reuse under many conditions. This IBC type often features an interior liner, blow-mold manufactured from polyethylene, that is structurally supported by a protective cage frame, often of galvanized steel composition. Caged IBCs are engineered for the bulk handling of liquids, semi-solids, as well as solid materials. All materials can present certain safety and compatibility concerns, especially hazardous liquids, and proper guidance is always recommended whenever using caged IBC totes for harsh chemicals.

Caged IBC totes are thermoplastic blow-mold engineered, often, from virgin high-density polyethylene (HDPE), a BPA-free, strong plastic. Caged tote engineering is a top port inlet with cap for filling of cargo, typically 150 or 225 mm (5.9 or 8.9 in) with a bottom discharge outlet port, typically 50 mm (2.0 in) ball valves, and an integrated pallet base skid for maneuvering the IBC. The pallet base of composite IBCs often features four-way access channels for universal handling by moving equipment such as forklifts and pallet jacks.

Caged IBC engineering has been able to produce a multi-industry use container that is mobile, convenient, consistent, durable, as well as compatible. The high-density polyethylene used in the construction of rigid, poly caged IBC totes is a durable thermoplastic chosen for its compatibility with many chemicals and materials often employed throughout industries, commercial applications, agriculture as well as consumer-based uses, as caged IBCs are often repurposed for aquaponic gardening.

Caged intermediate bulk containers are standardized for manufacture to near a commonly accepted pallet size. Caged IBCs are often 1,200 by 1,000 by 1,150 mm (47 by 39 by 45 in) for 1,000 litres (260 US gal) and 1,200 by 1,000 by 1,350 mm (47 by 39 by 53 in) for 1,250 L (330 US gal), where both volume types are available in either new, rebottled, or reconditioned model types, where: rebottled means a brand new HDPE liner in a previously used but certified steel cage, and; reconditioned means a previously used but cleaned and certified HDPE liner and cage.

=== Flexible IBC - big bag ===
A standard flexible intermediate bulk container can hold 500 to 1,000 kg (1,100 to 2,200 lb) and manufacturers offer bags with a volume of 285–2,830 L (10–100 cu ft).

Flexible intermediate bulk containers are made of woven polyethylene or polypropylene or other heavy polymers. Bags are designed for storing or transporting dry, flowable products, such as sand, fertilizer, and plastic granules. They typically have lifting straps but are frequently handled on a pallet.

== Engineered design ==
Most IBCs are cube-shaped and this cube-shaped engineering contributes to the packaging, stacking, storing, shipping, and overall space efficiency of intermediate bulk containers. Rigid IBC totes feature integrated pallet bases with dimensions that are generally near the common pallet standard dimension of 1,200 by 1,000 mm or 48 by 42 in (1,219 by 1,067 mm). IBC containers' pallet base is designed for universal maneuverability via forklift/pallet jack channels. Almost all rigid IBCs are designed so they can be stacked vertically one atop the other using a forklift. Most have a built-in tap (valve, spigot, or faucet) at the base of the container to which hoses can be attached, or through which the contents can be poured into smaller containers.

The most common IBC size, 1000 L, fits on a single pallet of similar dimensions to pallets which hold 4 drums (200 L (53 US gal)), providing an extra 200 L (53 US gal) of product in the IBC over drum storage, a 25% increase for the same storage footprint. Additionally, IBCs can be manufactured to a customer's exact requirements in terms of capacity, dimensions, and material.

== Advantages ==
There are many advantages to the engineering and design of the IBC model:

- Being approximately cubic in form, they can transport more material in the same footprint compared to cylindrical-shaped containers, and far more than might be shipped in the same space compared to packaging in consumer quantities.
- Composite IBCs rely on plastic liners that can be filled and discharged with a variety of systems.
- The manufacturer/processor of a product can bulk package a product in one country and ship to many other countries at a reasonably low cost where it is subsequently packaged in final consumer form in accordance with the regulations of that country and in a form and language suitable for that country.
- High organization, mobility, integration capabilities.
- Increase logistic and handling timelines, efficiencies, and capacity through single container filling, moving, loading, transit, and dispensing.
- Potential long term assets given the durability of IBC construction materials.
- Provides a reliable and consistent way to handle or store materials.

== Uses ==
IBCs are often used to ship, handle, and/or store:

- Bulk chemicals including hazardous materials or dangerous goods
- Commodities and raw materials used in industrial production
- Liquid, granulated, and powdered food ingredients
- Food syrups, such as corn syrup, maple syrup or molasses
- Petrochemical products, such as oil, gas, solvents, detergents, or adhesives
- Rainwater
- Used IBCs are the basic building blocks for many home aquaponic systems
- Paints and industrial coatings
- Pharmaceutical compounds, ingredients, intermediates, batch products
- Healthcare related items, solid commodities, bio-waste, waste materials
- Vineyards, wine fermentation, spirits production
- Agriculture, nursery, greenhouse uses and chemicals
- Many water, waste water, process water applications across industry sectors
- Used by land owners to support firefighting activities

== Acquisition and disposal ==
Intermediate bulk containers may be purchased or leased. Bar code and RFID tracking systems are available with associated software.

An IBC can be purchased as a new unit (bottle and cage), a rebottled unit (new bottle and washed cage) or a washed unit (both bottles and cages have been washed). A washed unit is typically less expensive, with the new unit being the most expensive, and the rebottled unit near the mid-point. In many cases, a customer may purchase a mix (“blend”) of these types of units under a single price, to simplify the accounting.

The customer's choice of unit primarily depends on either actual or perceived sensitivity of their product to contamination, and the overall ability to clean their specific product type from the bottle. Those with a lower contamination risk are prime candidates for the washed units. With the exception of products produced in "clean rooms" (GMP - good manufacturing practices), the decision of a washed over a new is usually a matter of availability or appearance.

An IBC can be leased in a closed-loop (using only the IBCs which were used by a given customer and washed or rebottled) or the most common open-loop system (where the origin of the rebottled or wash unit is flexible). For plastic composite units, the trip lease has largely been replaced by a blended purchase. Single use flexible IBCs such as those used for aggregate transportation in the construction industry are a major source of plastic pollution. Most aggregate suppliers do not offer a scheme to refund a deposit upon return of empty IBCs and in the UK they are frequently fly tipped and seen abandoned roadside.

== Safety ==
When exposed to fire as in a warehouse event, plastic IBCs containing combustible or flammable liquids can melt or burn fairly rapidly, releasing their entire contents and increasing the fire hazard by the sudden addition of combustible fuel. Rigid plastic (as high-density polyethylene) IBCs that transport and house flammable/combustible materials are recommended to have clear labelling and be stored within properly secured structures and according to government regulations, (such as NFPA and OSHA, in the U.S.) Metal IBCs (as carbon steel and stainless steel) are often approved per UL 142 requirements for housing these materials long term. Accordingly, metal IBC tanks can be used for Class I materials, while rigid plastic IBCs can be used for Class II/III materials.

Concerning the mechanical stability and sloshing of intermediate bulk containers during transport, some research has been performed through the US Department of Transportation which seems to indicate that IBC containers perform overall very well during transit in terms of sloshing and mechanical stability.

For metal IBCs, test reports by the German Bundesanstalt für Materialforschung und -prüfung (BAM) show that a metal IBC can withstand fire for at least 30 minutes, if it is equipped with a pressure venting device.

== See also ==
- Barrel
- Bulk box
- CargoBeamer
- Drum
- Drum pump
- Dutch flower bucket
- Flexible intermediate bulk container
- Intermodal container
- Liquid hydrogen tanktainer
- Roller container
- Spill pallet
- Tank container
- Wooden box
