= Reusable container =

Several articles, categories, and lists cover the topic of reusable containers:

- Container - many types are reusable
- Reusable packaging
  - Resealable packaging
  - Reuse of bottles
  - Reusable shopping bag

== See also ==
- Category:Containers
