= Harold Krikke =

Dutch scientist

Hans Ronald "Harold" Krikke (born 1967) is a widely recognized scientist working in the closed loop supply chain field.

== Education and career ==
Krikke studied Industrial Engineering and Management at University of Twente in Enschede. He completed his Ph.D. in 1998 in the field of reverse logistics and subsequently he worked as an assistant professor at Erasmus University Rotterdam and as a business consultant at Tebodin.

Between 2001 and 2005 Krikke worked as a project manager at CentER Applied Research and in 2005 he was appointed associate professor at the Tilburg School of Economics and Business. In April 2008 Krikke became the professor of Closed Loop Supply Chains at Open University Netherlands.

In 2010, he became the Durabilit Professor of Closed Loop Supply Chains at the Open University Netherlands.

== Expertise ==
Since 1994 Krikke has conducted research in the field of reverse logistics and specifically on the concept of a closed loop supply chain and its relationship with purchasing procedures, product life cycle management, sales and marketing.

== Closed loop supply chains ==
A closed loop supply chain recovers and reuses all the materials that are involved in the production process, including the final product itself along with its packaging. Steps toward achieving that state involve reducing material flows, thereby reducing and limiting carbon footprint, CO_{2} emissions and waste. To manage a closed-loop supply chain optimally, three things are vital. First, match the type of return with the appropriate supply chain. Second, adopt modular reuse, to recover maximal value. Third, the value of re-use data may in some cases be higher than the value of the returns.

According to the closed loop supply chain methodology a product first needs to enter into the re-use loop, then into the remanufacturing loop, and finally in the recycling loop.

== Research topics ==
=== Resource scarcity ===
Krikke warns that natural resource scarcity is becoming a serious issue. He concludes that there is a lack of data on some resources, but that it is clear that there are less and less materials, energy and water available. Mining companies invest in increasingly remote and politically dangerous areas or in the deep sea to reach ever scarcer reserves. As an example Krikke mentions a large French car manufacturer that was notified by its sustainability officer that most of their factories are located in regions where water is scarce. Because of the high water bills their cars could become unaffordable. Krikke concludes that scarcity of resources have an enormous long term negative environmental and economical impact. A closed loop supply chain and re-using products thus becomes more relevant.

=== Impact of supply chain on carbon footprint ===
Krikke studied the impact of a copier manufacturer's supply chain on the total carbon footprint of the product and in the handling of end-of-life vehicles. He found that customers knowledge of a product's carbon footprint can affect purchasing decisions, for example new versus second hand. Companies do not routinely calculate carbon footprint data, and often neglect the supply chain portion of that footprint. Outsourcing complicates this calculation.

When looking at refrigerators and cars, 80-90% of CO_{2} emissions are emitted during the user phase. By contrast, personal computers emit 80-90% of their CO_{2} emissions during production and distribution. For network switches, routers and cell-phones, 50% of CO_{2} output occurs in the supply chain. To increase knowledge and awareness of the positive impact of reuse, Krikke has developed the "Greener Network Calculator," which gives a clear overview and insight into how much CO_{2} emissions are reduced when buying and using second hand hardware rather than new hardware.

== Principal publications ==
- Krikke, Harold R. (2011). "Impact of closed-loop network configurations on carbon footprints: A case study in copiers; Resources, Conservation and Recycling 55". Citeulike.org. pp. 1196–1205. Archived from the original on 2018-09-28.
- Krikke, Harold R.; van der Laan, E.A (2011-09-01). "Last Time Buy and control policies with phase-out returns: a case study in plant control systems". International Journal of Production Research. 49 (17): 5183–5206. doi:10.1080/00207543.2010.531057. S2CID 198771090.
- Krikke, Harold R. (2010). "Opportunistic versus life cycle oriented decision making in multi-loop recovery: An eco-eco study on disposed vehicles". The International Journal of Life Cycle Assessment. 15 (8): 757–768. Bibcode:2010IJLCA..15..757K. doi:10.1007/s11367-010-0217-y.
- Zoeteman, B.C.J.; Krikke, Harold R.; Venselaar, J. (2010). "Handling WEEE waste flows: On the effectiveness of producer responsibility in a globalizing world". International Journal of Advanced Manufacturing Technology. 47 (5–8): 415–436. doi:10.1007/s00170-009-2358-3.
- Krikke, Harold R.; Le Blanc, H.M.; van Krieken, M.G.C.; Fleuren, H.A. (2008). "Low frequency collection of materials disassembled from end-of-life vehicles: On the value of on-line monitoring in optimizing route planning". International Journal of Production Economics. 111 (2): 209–228. doi:10.1016/j.ijpe.2006.10.015.
- Zuidwijk, R.; Krikke, Harold R. (2008-02-02). "Strategic response to EEE returns: Product eco-design or new recovery processes?". European Journal of Operational Research. 191 (3): 1206–1222. doi:10.1016/j.ejor.2007.08.004.
- Krikke, Harold R.; Le Blanc, H.M.; van Krieken, M.G.C.; Fleuren, H.A. (2006). "Vehicle routing concepts in the closed-loop container network of ARN—a case study". OR Spectrum. 28 (1): 53–71. doi:10.1007/s00291-005-0003-6. S2CID 62990474.
- Krikke, Harold R. (2005). "Closed loop supply chain: Re-use of products". Finance Incorporated. 1 (2).
- Fleischmann, M.; Krikke, Harold R.; Dekker, R.; Flapper, S.D.P. (2000). "A characterization of logistics networks for product recovery. Omega". International Journal of Management Science. 28 (6): 653–666. doi:10.1016/S0305-0483(00)00022-0.
- Krikke, Harold R.; Le Blanc, H.M.; van de Velde, S. (2004-02-01). "Product modularity and the design of closed-loop supply chains". California Management Review. 46 (2): 23–39. doi:10.2307/41166208. JSTOR 41166208. S2CID 154940233.
- Krikke, Harold R.; Bloemhof-Ruwaard, J.; Wassenhove, L.N. van (2003). "Concurrent product and closed-loop supply chain design with an application to refrigeration". International Journal of Production Research. 41 (16): 3689–3719. Bibcode:2003IJPR...41.3689K. doi:10.1080/0020754031000120087. S2CID 110942855.
- Krikke, Harold R.; van Harten, A.; Schuur, P.C. (1998). "On a medium term product recovery and disposal strategy for durable assembly products". International Journal of Production Research. 36 (1): 111–139. doi:10.1080/002075498193967. S2CID 111031645.
