= Green supply chain management =

Consideration of environmental issues in supply chain management

Green supply chain management (GSCM) is the consideration of environmental issues within supply chain management.

== Definitions and scope ==
GSCM has been defined as the following:

- "GSCM encompasses a set of environmental practices that encourage improvements to the environmental practices of two or more organizations within the same supply chain"
- "GSCM is the process of incorporating environmental concerns into supply chain management including product design, material sourcing and selection, manufacturing, delivery of final products, and the management of product's end-of-life"
- "GSCM can be achieved by considering environmental issues at the purchasing, product design and development, production, transportation, packaging, storage, disposal, and end of product life cycle management stages."
- "GSCM is the integration of environmental concerns in the inter-organizational practices of supply chain management"

Srivastava (2007) defines the scope of GSCM as ranging "from reactive monitoring of general environmental management programs to more proactive practices implemented through various Rs (Reduce, Re-use, Rework, Refurbish, Reclaim, Recycle, Remanufacture, Reverse logistics, etc.)". He includes "green design" within GSCM, which involves a conscious review of the materials and processes adopted by a business as well as management of the suppliers from whom materials and services are obtained. From an entrepreneurial perspective, entrepreneurial GSCM is a new approach to environmental management executed by green entrepreneurs across whole supply chains instead of thinking in terms of individual non-environmental firms. This new holistic view can integrate individuals, companies, and supply-chains of different entrepreneurs from various countries together in an environmental friendly way.

== GSCM criteria ==
A nonexhaustive list of GSCM criteria from D. Kannan et al. (2014) is given below.

GSCM Criteria 1
"Commitment of senior management to GSCM"
"The support of senior management is crucial in GSCM adoption, as there will be an eventual need for process adjustments or cultural changes"
GSCM Criteria 2
"Inter-functional cooperation for environmental improvement"
"Inter-functional cooperation (e.g., purchases and sustainability, research and development in sustainability, or marketing and stability, etc.) is important in implementing changes in the day-today activities of the functional areas. This type of cooperation can therefore promote environmental requirements externally via upstream suppliers, or internally via consumer demand"
GSCM Criteria 3
"Compliance with legal environmental requirements and auditing programs"
"Addressing environmental legal requirements and auditing programs demonstrates that the company is attempting to meet environmental regulation for their sector internally"
GSCM Criteria 4
"ISO 14001 Certification"
"The company has an ISO 14001 certified EMS"
GSCM Criteria 5
"Selection of suppliers includes environmental criteria"
Explanation – "The selection process for suppliers considers environmental variables (e.g., ISO 14001) in addition to traditional criteria (e.g., cost, quality, reliability, etc.)"
GSCM Criteria 6
"Work with suppliers to meet environmental goals"
"Suppliers are asked to support initiatives and measures within their company to improve the environment"
GSCM Criteria 7
"Evaluations of the internal environmental management of suppliers"
"Inspections of supplier installations provide a way to check the environmental performance of the supplier and ensure that they comply with environmental management standards"
GSCM Criteria 8
"Evaluation of the environmental management of 2nd-tier suppliers"
"Suppliers of basic raw materials are also monitored to extend environmental concern beyond the direct relationship"
GSCM Criteria 9
"Work with clients for eco-design"
"Utilizing the close relationships that traditional supply chain management allows, companies seek to develop products together with clients to improve the products' environmental impact"
GSCM Criteria 10
"Work with clients to make production cleaner"
"Utilizing the close relationships that traditional supply chain management allows, companies seek to manufacture more cleanly with cooperation from the client"
GSCM Criteria 11
"Work with clients to use environmentally friendly packaging"
"Utilizing the close relationships that traditional supply chain management allows, companies seek to use environmentally friendly packaging with cooperation from clients"
GSCM Criteria 12
"Acquisition of the cleanest technologies by the company"
"The company buys equipment that allows it to make products as cleanly as possible"
GSCM Criteria 13
"Product designs that reduce, reuse, recycle, or reclaim materials, components, or energy"
"The company observes policies on material reduction, parts reuse, recycling of the product after use, and recuperation of materials, components, or energy throughout the product's life"
GSCM Criteria 14
"Product designs that avoid or reduce toxic or hazardous material use"
"In developing products, the company incorporates ways to avoid or reduce the use of dangerous or toxic products"]1
GSCM Criteria 15
"Sale of excess stock or materials"
"The company seeks to sell obsolete stock to recuperate its investment"
GSCM Criteria 16
"Sale of scrap and used materials"
"The company seeks to sell waste and used materials (i.e., materials that do not have value in the production line) to recuperate its investment"
GSCM Criteria 17
"Sale of used equipment (after buying new equipment)"
"The company sells used equipment to recuperate its investment"

=== Relative importance of criteria ===
Instead of concentrating equally on every criterion, more attention should be given to the most important criteria. D. Kannan et al. (2014) calculated the importance of criteria by taking the preferences of 3 decision-makers:

Criteria	Decision Maker 1	Decision Maker 2	Decision Maker 3
1	Very High	Very High	Very High
2	High	High	Very High
3	High	Very High	Very High
4	Very High	High	Medium
5	High	Very High	High
6	High	High	Very High
7	High	High	Medium
8	High	Medium	Medium
9	Very High	High	High
10	High	Medium	Medium
11	High	High	High
12	High	High	Very High
13	Very High	Very High	Very High
14	Very High	High	Very High
15	High	Medium	Medium
16	High	Medium	Low
17	High	Medium	Very Low

In this table, the preferences of criteria are given in terms of linguistic variables. From these linguistic variables, calculations were done to find out the ranking of the importance of criteria.

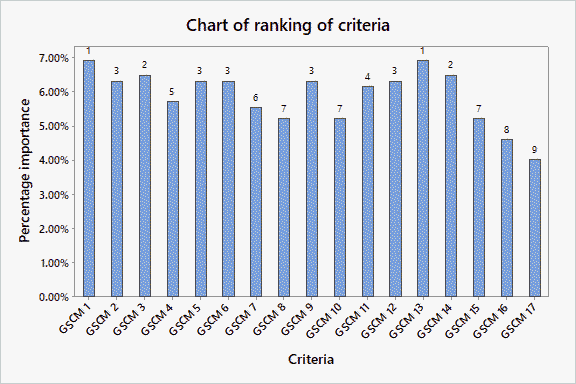
Chart of Percentage importance of GSCM criteria

Form the above graph; it is clear that the top 4 most important GSCM criteria are

- GSCM Criteria 1 : "Commitment of senior management to GSCM"
- GSCM Criteria 13 : "Product designs that reduce, reuse, recycle, or reclaim materials, components, or energy"
- GSCM Criteria 3 : "Compliance with legal environmental requirements and auditing programs"
- GSCM Criteria 14 : "Product designs that avoid or reduce toxic or hazardous material use"

This result was obtained when the authors considered the GSCM criteria for choosing a supplier for an electronics company in Brazil (a developing country). Depending on the situation, it is possible that other GSCM criteria are deemed to be more important by the decision-makers. (For example, if the same research were done in a developed country instead of a developing country, other criteria might have received a higher ranking).

== Barriers ==
Tumpa et al., 2019 conducted a study to find the hurdles faced while implementing GSCM practices. The study was conducted in the textile industry of Bangladesh (a developing country). Some of the most important hurdles were found out to be

- low demand from customers due to lack of awareness
- financial constraint
- lack of government regulations

Other hurdles may be more important in different situations (Example – if the study were done in a developed country instead of a developing country)

Another considerable hurdle for firms trying to implement GSCM practices is the fact that many suppliers along the complete supply chain reside outside of any direct organizational control from the firm. Supply chains are often built upon a network of individual suppliers and a firm's ability to meet their Corporate Sustainability Standards can be hindered by suppliers with which they do not directly interact.

== Relevance ==
Increase in publications
The number of publications on GSCM has been increasing for the past few years. The figure below shows the number of publications on GSCM from the year 2006 to 2016. By observing the figure, we can find an increasing trend in the number of publications in GSCM. This increase is likely the effect of the rising significance of environmental concerns in the area of supply chain management.

Figure of Increase in publications is mentioned (data from de Oliveira (2018) et al.)

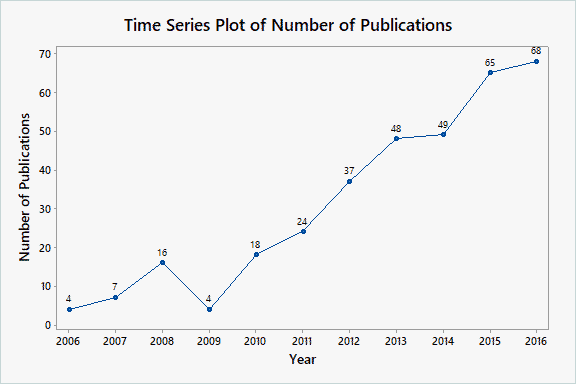
Increase in Publications in gscm

"It is expected to see the GSCM publication increase trend perceivable for the next years."

Both developed and developing countries are doing research on GSCM.
Research on GSCM is being done by both developed and developing countries. The figure below shows the number of publications from the top 10 countries

Figure of publications from various countries is mentioned (data from de Oliveira (2018) et al.)

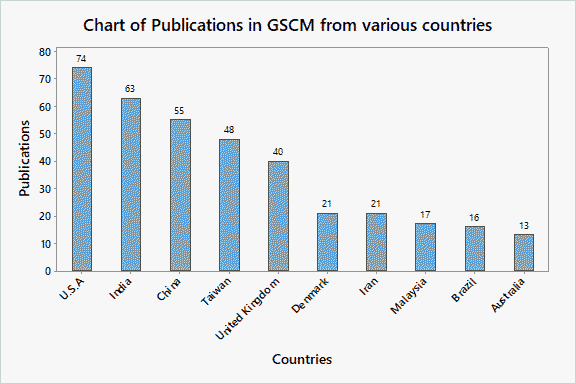
Chart of Publications in gscm from various countries

From the figure, it is clear that both developed countries like the U.S.A. and developing countries like India and China are conducting research on GSCM. This is also due to the rising importance of environmental issues in the context of supply chain management.
