= Cutty bang =

Bottles of alcohol in a plastic bag

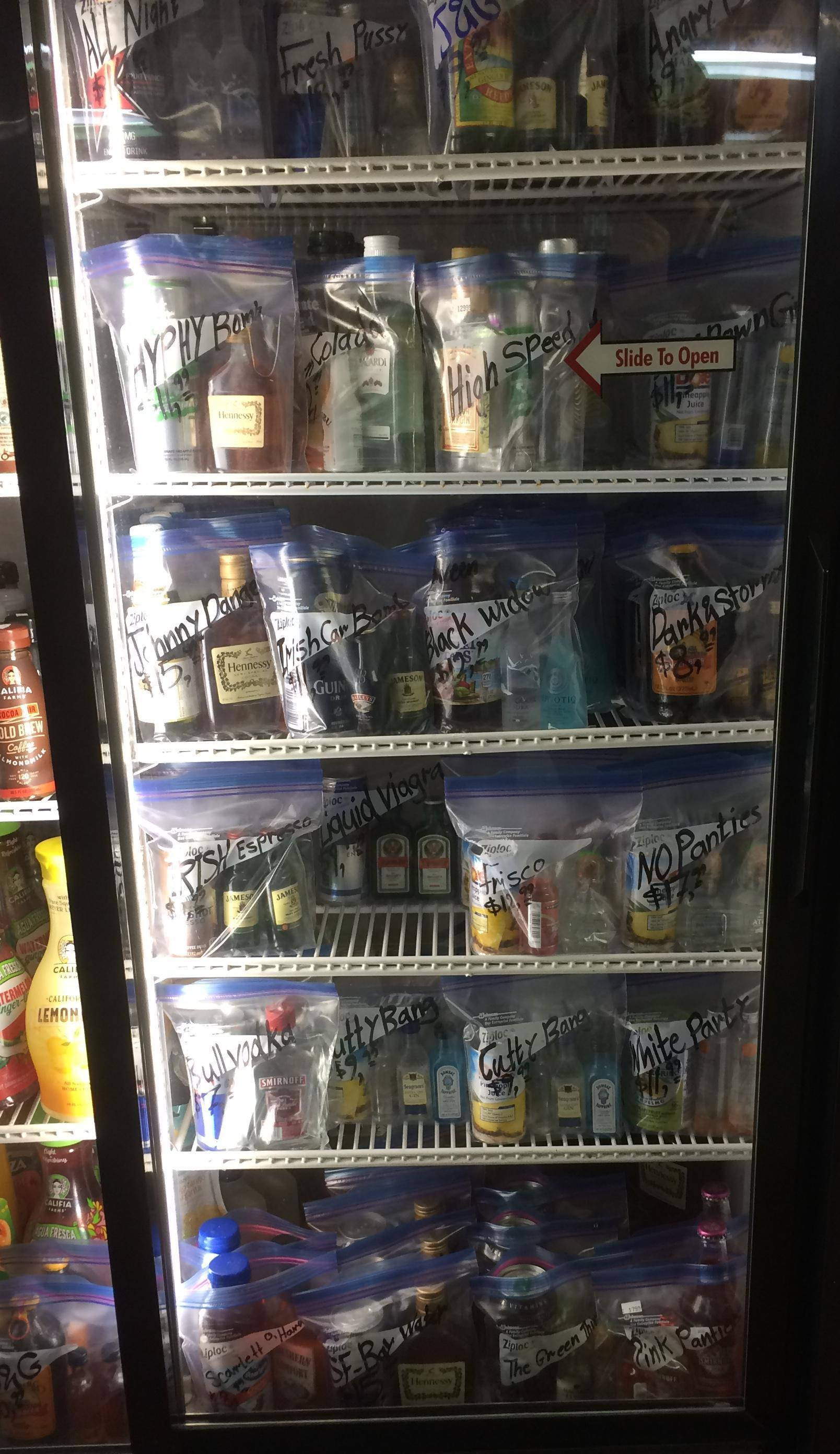
- Cutty bangs in the Mission, 2015
- Type: Mixed drink
- Ingredients: Various; "Cutty Bang" is Tanqueray, Seagram's, Bacardi Limon, and pineapple juice
- Served: Multiple bottles sold in a plastic bag, mixed with ice in a styrofoam or plastic cup

A cutty bang is a plastic bag containing several small bottles of alcohol and a mixer or canned drink, intended to be combined as a mixed drink. They are sold in plastic bags in select liquor stores in the San Francisco Bay Area.

Cutty bangs reportedly originated as early as the 1970s. "Cutty" is Northern California slang for "shady", i.e., "probably not legal/safe/advisable". In the 21st century, they continue to be sold in select liquor stores in San Francisco neighborhoods such as the Mission, Tenderloin, and Bayview–Hunters Point and the cities of Oakland and Daly City, and also in at least one bodega in Brooklyn. Costing from US$7–20 for a bag of the ingredients, they are generally combined and consumed in a 20-ounce styrofoam or plastic cup with ice just after leaving the store.

The original "Cutty Bang" consists of bottles of Tanqueray and Seagram's gin and Bacardi Limon rum, and a can of pineapple juice. However, there are many other variations of the concept of bottles in a bag, which are often given creative labels in permanent marker; a "High Speed" generally contains multiple small bottles of rum and an energy drink such as a Red Bull Yellow Edition or a grapple Hyphy, while in 2011 a "Freak Me" contained melon rum, vodka, gin, watermelon pucker, and cranberry juice. Liquor stores can be protective of their original recipes and names. Other names for the concept include "hood drinks", "mix drinks", "mix kits", and "mixers".

== In popular culture ==
- "Cutty Bang", a 1998 hip hop song by TayDaTay featuring Big Mack; one of the earliest known references to the drink
- "Cutty Bang", a 2000 hip hop song by Kalifornia Noize Terrorists
