= Krikke =

Krikke is a Dutch surname. Notable people with the surname include:

- Harold Krikke (born 1967), Dutch scientist
- Jan Krikke (born 1940), Dutch painter and sculptor
- Pauline Krikke (born 1961), Dutch politician
