= Closed-loop box reuse =

Business practice

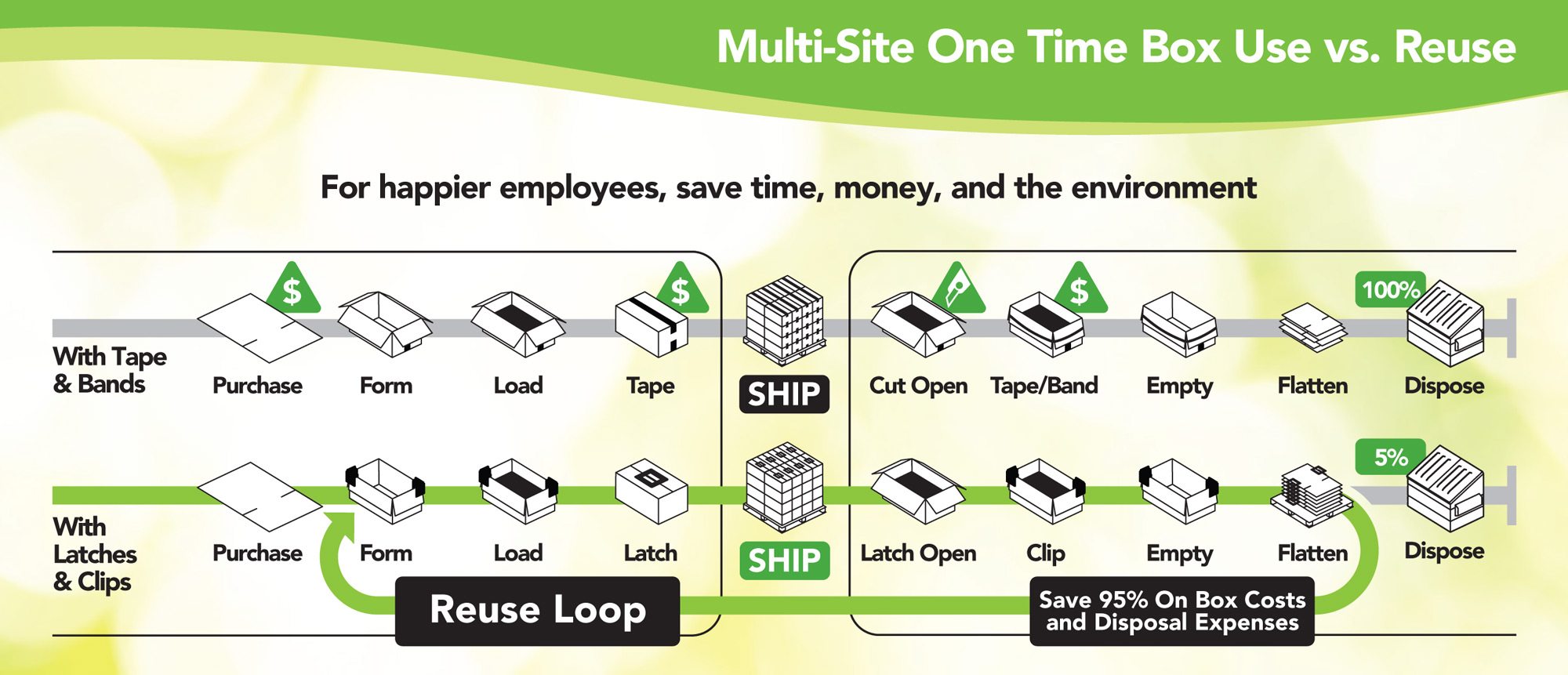
This image depicts the closed-loop box reuse between multiple locations on the same or distant premises.

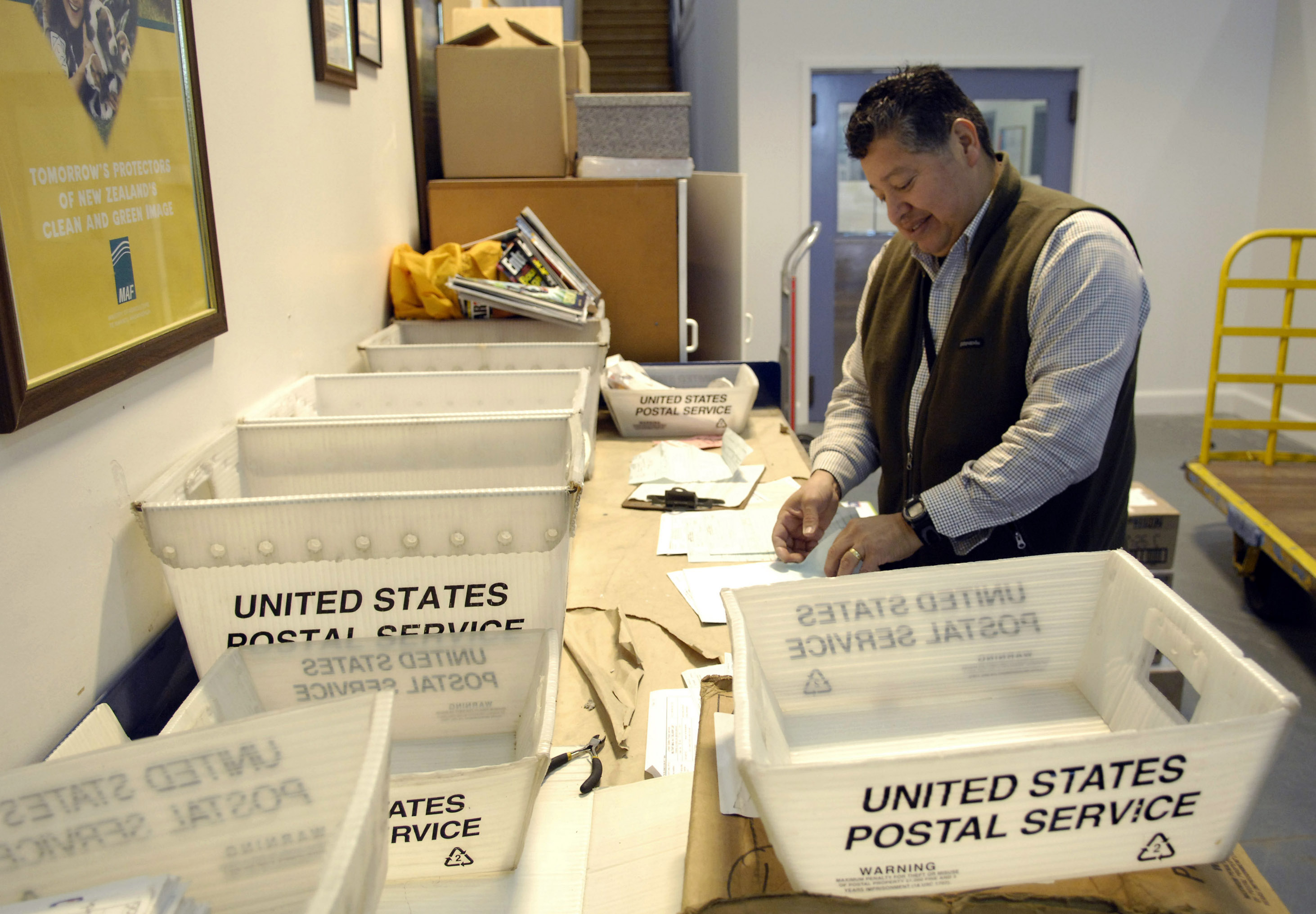
Reusable plastic containers for sorting and routing mail

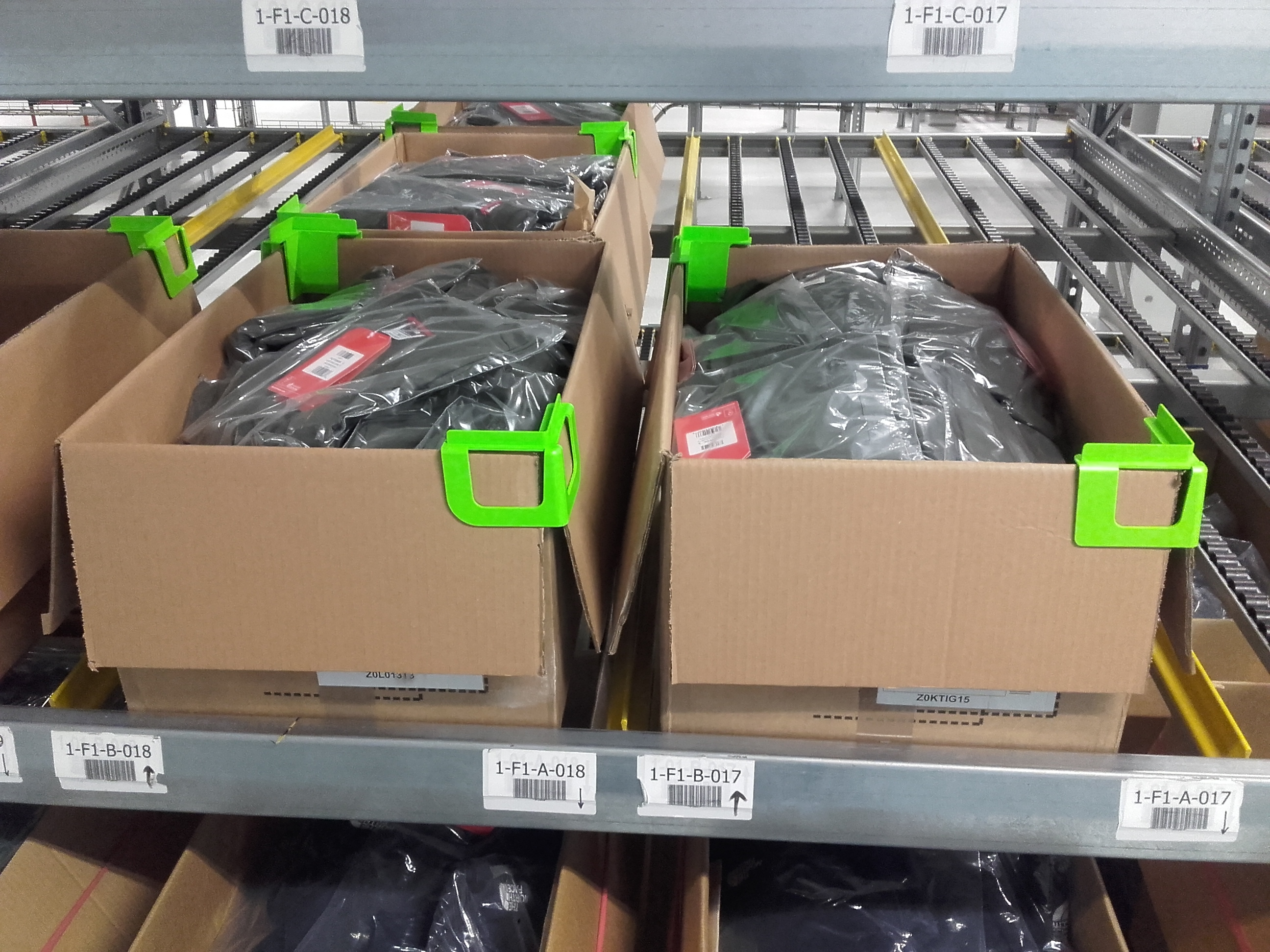
Clips holding flaps open on conveyors during work in progress (WIP)

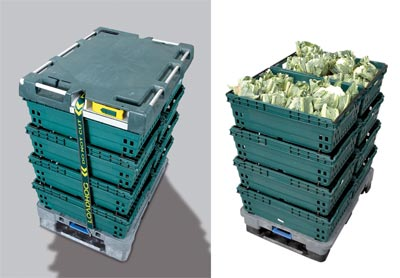
Molded plastic containers for distribution, return, and reuse

Closed-loop box reuse, is the process by which boxes or other containers are reused many times. It is a form of reusable packaging.

This is sometimes suited to a large business where containers are used and reused within the location; the custody of containers stays in secure control. Business-to-business commerce also allows controlled return by reverse logistics; a “closed system” and a circular life cycle. Containers may be constructed of corrugated fiberboard, corrugated plastic, molded plastic, or other materials. Identification of containers by labels, bar codes, various colored latches or RFID chips is common.

== Description ==
Reusable corrugated box. Partial overlap box has center slots to tuck flaps loosely closed for in-plant storage or routing. When palletized and shrink wrapped, it can be used as a shipping container.

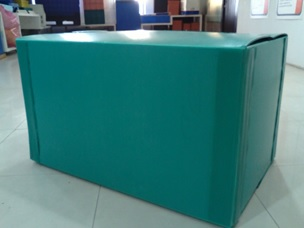
Corrugated plastic box can be used and reused many times. Most PSA tapes can be removed without damaging the surface.

When closed loop supply chains exist or can be created during work in process or progress, boxes are frequently opened and closed to remove and replace contents for inspections, calibration, testing, quality assurance, powder coating or other purposes. Eliminating tape during this process eliminates human injuries from box cutters, blades and knives as well as eliminating damage to box contents.

A means of closing the containers is usually needed such as lids, covers, straps, staples, tape, latches, clips, bands, Hook-and-loop fasteners, etc. When using devices that hold flaps down and out of the way, they can be stacked and stored open or moved about on carts, conveyors, trucks or pallets while remaining open. This saves time and labor while enhancing [{sustainability]} by reusing clips and undamaged boxes. It is important that these temporary means of closure and reopening does not deface or damage the cartons.

At endpoints in these single or multi-site linear or circular closed loops, the temporary closures are removed for reuse and boxes taped for secure shipping to their next or a final destination.

Alternatively, these fiberboard boxes may be collapsed with their closing devices attached and returned to the loop origin in a flattened manner. This reduces time and spares human injuries caused by cutting tape on tops and bottoms. It also lowers costs for freight and allows for speedy reconstruction of cartons in a tapeless, closed loop.

Containers can be reused dozens of times before disposal or recycling. This leverages supply chain cost savings at the same time it embraces supply chain sustainability.

== History ==
Reuse of boxes and other containers has been common for many years. For example, the automotive industry has long used reusable racks, totes, and boxes. One type of "closed loop box reuse" was used by Jack D. and James F. Wilson, coinventors of supportive devices developed to keep cardboard box flaps closed or held open without the use of tape. The closed loop term describes a circular life for boxes and cartons made possible by the help of such supportive devices.

Closed-loop box reuse is the process by which packaging materials can be used and reused to minimize waste. Similar and overlapping terms commonly used are closed-loop recycling, returnable packaging, reusable packaging, sustainable supply chains and circular economy. Laws have been passed in Maine and Oregon to make it the responsibility of producers of waste to pay into a fund based on the amount and the ability of the materials used in their packaging to be recycled. These funds will be employed to reimburse municipalities for eligible recycling and waste management costs, make investments in recycling infrastructure, and help citizens understand how to recycle.

A circular economy is a large-scale model that involves the sharing, leasing, reusing, repairing, refurbishing and recycling of existing material in a global environment. Reverse logistics is an alternative to a traditional linear economy (take, make, waste). It seeks to reduce waste, recover resources at the end of a product's life, and channel it back into production, thus, significantly reducing pressure on the environment. Closed-loop box reuse shares similar goals and perspectives but is specific to the circular life cycle of fiberboard boxes in systems where reuse is the focus.

== Environmental impact ==
The goal of closed-loop fiberboard box reuse is to reduce waste and pollution. The supply chain accounts for more than 90% of the environmental impact experienced by most consumer goods companies, more than 800 million tons of cardboard and paper are disposed of yearly in the USA. Reusing one ton of fiberboard boxes saves 390 kWh of energy, 46 gallons of oil and 700 gallons of water.

Recycling (or reusing) that same ton of corrugated board produces less than 50% of sulfur-dioxide than if made from raw materials and saves more than 9 cubic yards of landfill. In 2018, over 17 million tons of paper and paperboard were landfilled in the U.S. It is the largest component of municipal solid waste.

Closed loop box reuse allows companies to meet their Circular Economy, ISO, Six Sigma, Lean Manufacturing or Zero Waste goals. Closed loop opportunities exist in assembly lines, pick and pack fulfillment centers, kitting operations, warehouse management systems, and moving and storage businesses.
