= Closed-loop recycling =

Sustainable recycling process

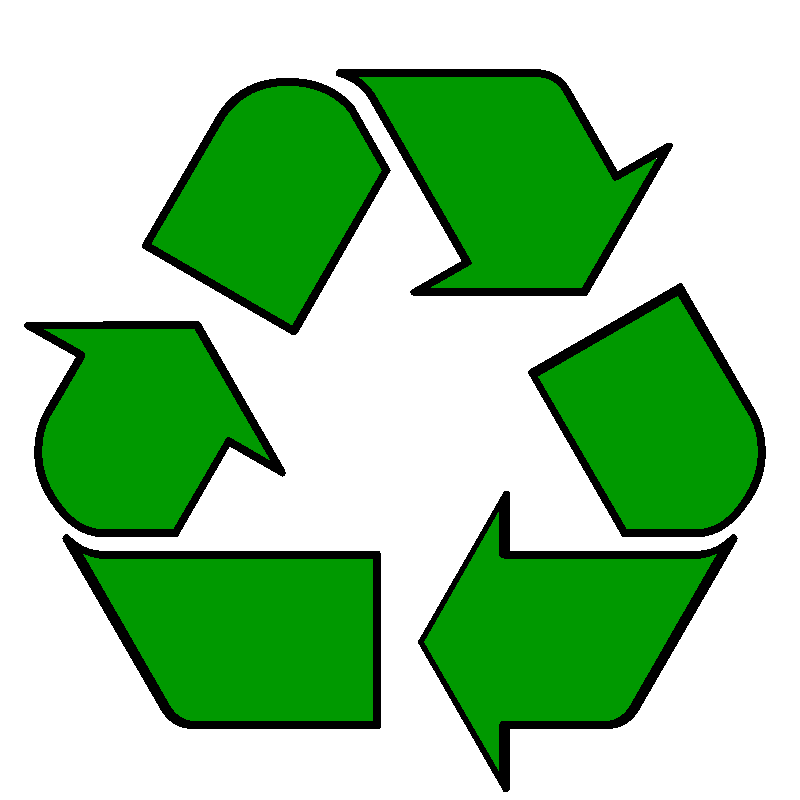
Recycling symbol

Closed-loop recycling is the process by which a product or material can be used and then turned into a new product (or converted back to raw material) indefinitely without losing its properties during the recycling process.

By reducing the production and use of raw materials, closed-loop recycling minimizes harm to the environment and discourages resource depletion. In contrast, open-loop recycling is the process by which a product is recycled but has to be mixed with raw materials to become a new product, typically leading to downcycling.

Ideal closed-loop systems produce no waste. They are called "closed" because products have a circular life cycle, beginning as raw materials and either being recycled into replacement products, returning to the original raw materials, or being returned to the environment as biodegradable waste. This reduces the amount of (non-biodegradable) waste disposed, as recyclables are recovered and reused, rather than ending up in a landfill or as a pollutant.

== Description ==
Closed-loop recycling involves collecting and sorting recycled materials, extracting resources from the materials, and using those resources as inputs in the manufacturing of products practically identical to the original. Recycled materials are collected from homes, businesses, and recycling banks.

In order to grow an economy while preventing depletion of natural resources, a given amount of a resource must be used as much as possible with as little waste as possible. Closed-loop recycling systems attempt to maximize the amount of time a given amount of a resource is available to an economy. In ideal systems, materials are recycled indefinitely with practically no net change in quality or properties. This allows the same bits of a resource to be extracted, manufactured, used, and recycled back into the same product forever. Waste is considered a resource in itself, closing the loop of resource production.

Recycled resources require less labor and energy to convert into new products, which reduces environmental pollution and production costs. Therefore, closed-loop recycling may be considered part of environmental sustainability programs.

One goal of closed-loop recycling is to reuse materials in an identical role as before recycling. In contrast, open-loop recycling systems do not reclaim all of a resource. Whether by design or due to the physical and chemical properties of the materials recycled, some amount of resources is wasted, used to manufacture different materials, or degraded in quality. The degradation of material such that it is only used to make goods that do not require the higher-quality material is called downcycling.

Some biodegradable waste may also be considered part of a closed-loop recycling system if it can be broken down into natural materials and disposed of without polluting the environment or causing other negative impacts.

The most suitable materials for closed-loop recycling are aluminum and glass. These are known to maintain their quality throughout many cycles of extraction, production, use, and recycling. For example, aluminum cans can be recycled and turned into new cans with practically no material degradation or waste.

== Economic considerations ==
The demand for products and efficiency of closed-loop supply chains are affected by the value of reclaimed resources.

Closed-loop recycling is common in specialized industries, such as the computer and battery industries. These industries use expensive or complex materials that are not easily broken down into constituent resources. Catherine Weetman, from Rethink Global, noted in 2021 that more closed loop supply chains were coming on stream along with some variations in their operating model: closed-loop systems retain use of reclaimed resources where they have been used already, whereas open loops allow recovered materials to go outside their originating enterprise.

Closed-loop recycling systems may reduce landfill contributions, allowing landfill plots to last longer. For example, recycling one ton of plastic in a closed-loop system saves about 7.4 cubic yards of landfill space. Since the grocery industry demonstrated that consumers use at least 690,000 tons of plastic in a year, universal implementation of ideal closed-loop recycling systems could save at least 5.1 million cubic yards of landfill space each year.

== See also ==
- Closed-loop box reuse
- Reusable packaging
