= Open University of the Netherlands =

Distance education university in the Netherlands

Coordinates: 50.87905°N 5.95931°E

- Open Universiteit Nederland
- Type: University for distance learning
- Established: 1984
- Faculty: 658
- Students: 15,295
- Location: Heerlen, Netherlands
- Website: www.ou.nl

The Open University of the Netherlands (Dutch: Open Universiteit Nederland) is a Dutch institution for distance learning at university level. It is an independent government-funded university and uses a variety of methods, including written materials, the Internet, and occasional evening seminars or day sessions.

== Overview ==
The Open University of the Netherlands was founded in 1984 and opened to students that September. The administration is based in Heerlen, Netherlands. The university has study and support centres dispersed throughout the continental Netherlands, as well as study centres in Dutch-speaking Belgium (Flanders) and partnerships with institutions in Aruba, Bonaire, Curaçao, Sint Maarten and Suriname.

Since the Open University was founded, more than 250,000 students have enrolled in courses. As of September 2016, approximately 15,000 students were enrolled at study or support centres in the Netherlands, including some residents of other countries.

== Aims ==
The Dutch government's purpose in founding the Open University of the Netherlands was to make higher education accessible to anyone with the necessary aptitudes and interests, regardless of formal qualifications. The university aims to provide cost-effective education and to encourage innovation in Dutch higher education, in terms of both curriculum and teaching.

== Organisation ==
=== Governance ===
The chairman of the Open University of the Netherlands since June 2016 is Arent van der Feltz, former vice president for corporate development, legal, regulatory and public affairs at Ziggo. His predecessor was Sander van den Eijnden.

=== Faculties ===
- Science: Environmental Sciences, Computer Science and Information Science
- Humanities
- Management
- Educational Sciences
- Psychology
- Law

In addition to this, the university has four expertise centres:

- CAROU: guidance in the deployment of technological and social innovations through research projects and education in areas such as Smart City, Cyber Security, Smart Industry, Climate Change and Continuous Learning
- Cyber Science Center: in cooperation with Politieacademie and NHL Hogeschool
- NEIMED (Nederlands expertise en innovatiecentrum maatschappelijke effecten demografische krimp): an alliance with Maastricht University and Zuyd University of Applied Sciences

The Open University also has two support staff departments: the Department of Administration and the Department of Support Services. These provide services ranging from academic affairs to student administration.

=== Courses of study ===
The Open University offers courses of study at the bachelor's and master's degree levels in the following disciplines: cultural studies, education science, law, management, psychology, science and technology. The university collaborates with Flemish universities to enable Belgian students to attend classes. Five of its master's degree programmes were top-ranked in 2017.

== Faculty ==
The following are present and former faculty members of the Open Universiteit:

- Harold Krikke
