= Zipper storage bag =

Resealable plastic bag

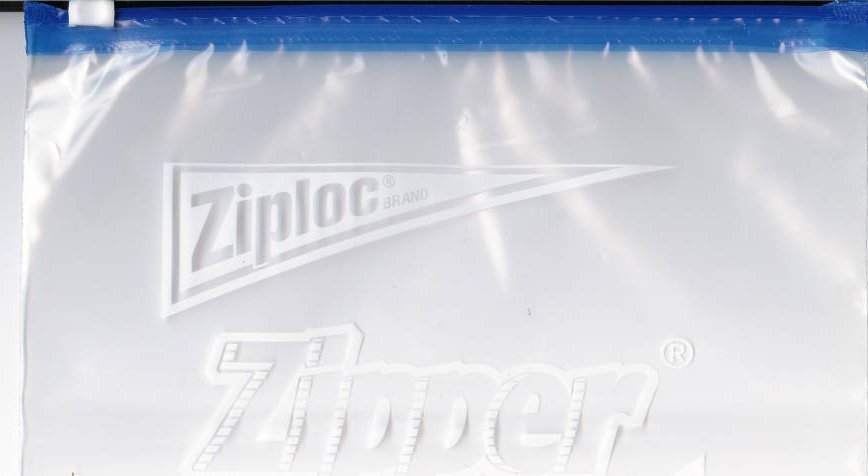
A Ziploc-branded storage bag

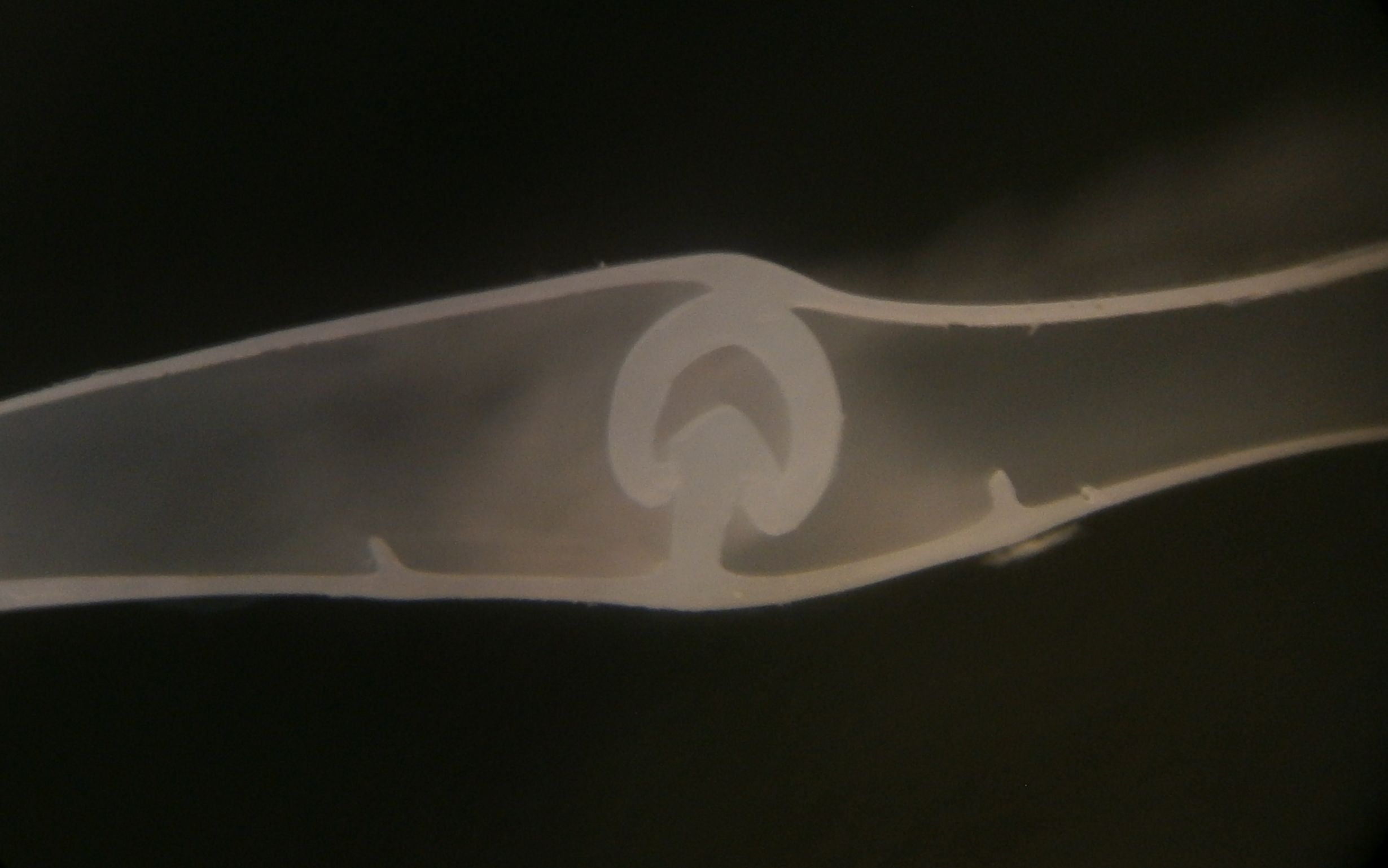
Close-up from a cross section of the sealing mechanism

A zipper storage bag, slider storage bag, zipper bag, ziplock bag, zip-lock bag, ziploc bag, or zippie is an inexpensive flexible rectangular storage bag, usually transparent, made of polyethylene or similar plastic, that can be sealed and opened many times, either by a slider, which works in a similar way to a zip fastener, or by pinching together the two sides of a mechanical sealing mechanism with one's fingers. The bags are made in many sizes; a typical small size is 1.5 by 2.5 inches (3.8 cm × 6.4 cm), and a typical large size is 9 by 12 inches (23 cm × 30 cm). Material thickness (gauge) varies; smaller bags are typically 40 to 45 μm.

Many such bags are used to contain foodstuffs, such as sandwiches but not cereal and freezer storage. Single and multiple small items for sale are often packed in small zipper bags for convenience and visibility.

Several types of reclosable features are available for plastic bags. Sometimes other types of bag, such as a cloth bag for toiletries fitted with a conventional zip fastener, are described as zipper bags.

== History ==
One bag was patented by Robert W. Vergobbi on May 18, 1954. In the same year, Minigrip licensed them as pencil bags. The zipper storage bag's most recognized function was not realized until 1957, when a fifth-grader named Robert Lejeune demonstrated that the bag could also be used safely as a food storage device. Eleven years later, in 1968, Dow Chemical Company began marketing them under the name Ziploc. Widetrack ribs were added in 1982, clicking zippers in 1993 and color in 1997.

== See also ==
- Plastic bag
- Resealable packaging
