= Resealable packaging =

Reusable product packaging

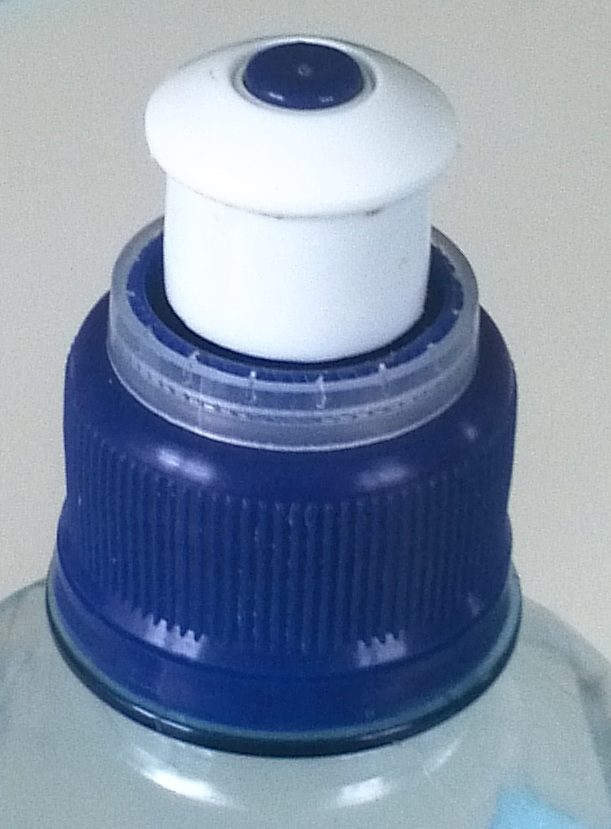
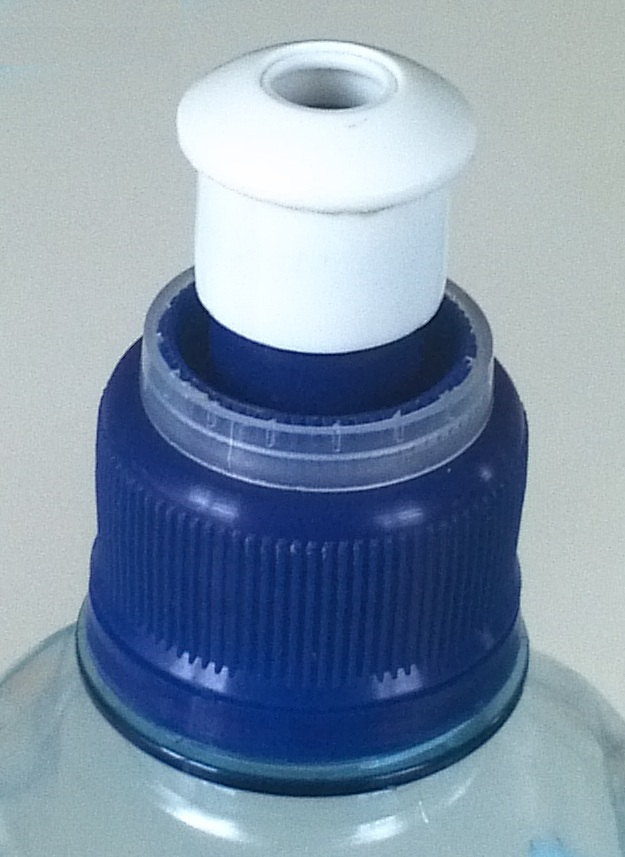
A resealable cap for dispensing and reclosing bottles of liquids.

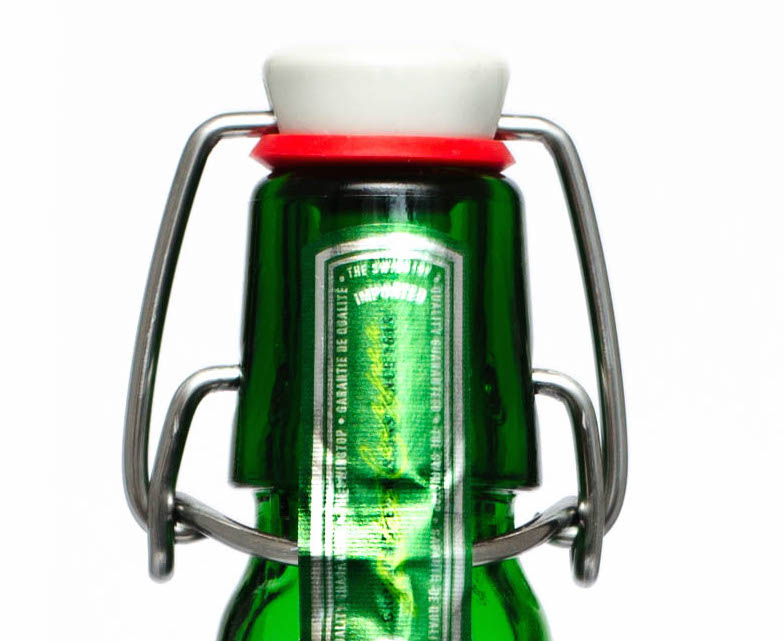
Reclosable flip-top closure on beer bottle

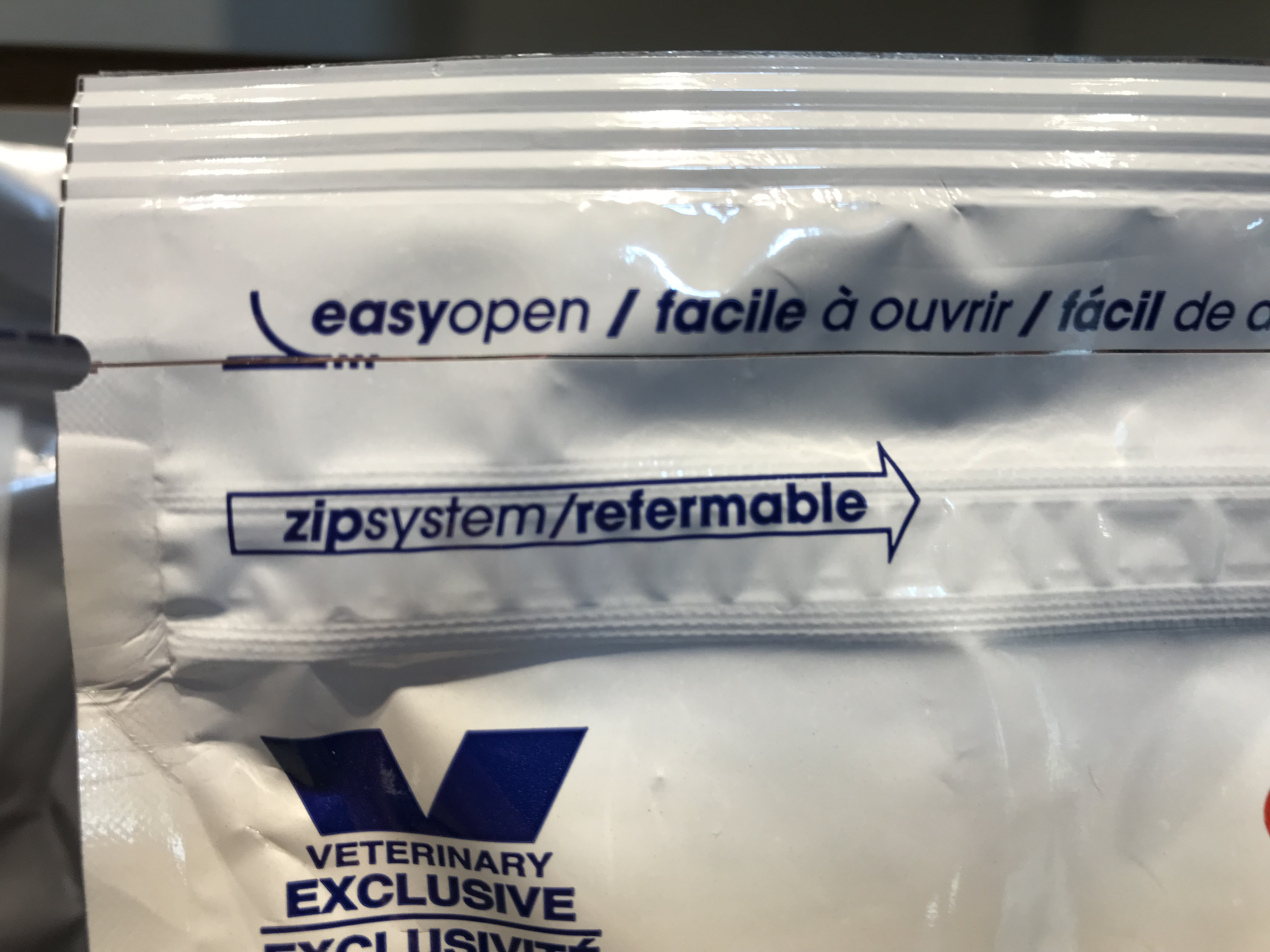
Stand-up pouch of cat treats. Close-up of top seal, opening notch, and internal reclosable strip

Resealable packaging is any type of packaging that allows the consumer or user to reseal or reclose the packaging. Often packaging needs to be resealed in order to maintain product freshness or prevent spillage. Reusable packaging allows for multiple uses which can help reduce waste.

== Methods ==
- Screw caps or other container closures with similar functions
- Hook and loop fasteners
- Pressure sensitive adhesive strips and tapes
- Interlocking plastic strips such as found on Zipper storage bags
- Zip packs: resealable packaging with a zip feature that keeps the container airtight. These packs are designed with an ergonomical clip which functions like a zipper but is airtight. These products feature flanged interlocking profiles that create a reliable seal when pressed together. Ziploc and Zip-Pak are manufacturers specializing in these products, the latter employing a slider to open and close the bag. The zip component of the packaging is supplied on a continuous roll, and is inserted between the upper and lower webs of the plastic film provided with the packaging. The zip is bonded to the packaging by a heat activated adhesive that is pre-applied to the backing of the zip. The first resealable packaging with a zipper was licensed in the United States by Minigrip® in 1954.

"Ziplock" is now used as a noun or adjective in relation to plastic bags using this type of seal regardless of manufacturer.

- Plastic wrap used to cover opened containers
- Lid (container)
- Twist ties
- Hook-and-loop fasteners to reattach a flap or lid
