= Reusable packaging =

Packaging designed for reuse

Reusable packaging is manufactured of durable materials and is specifically designed for multiple trips and extended life. A reusable package or container is "designed for reuse without impairment of its protective function." The term returnable is sometimes used interchangeably but it can also include returning packages or components for other than reuse: recycling, disposal, incineration, etc. Typically, the materials used to make returnable packaging include steel, wood, polypropylene sheets or other plastic materials.

Reusability of packaging is an important consideration of the environmental credo of "reduce, reuse, and recycle". It is also important to the movement toward more sustainable packaging. Returnable packaging is encouraged by regulators.

== Shipping containers ==
For many years, several types of shipping containers have been returnable and reusable. These have made most sense when a reverse logistics system is available or can be readily developed. A return, reconditioning, and reuse system can save money on the cost per shipment and can reduce the environmental footprint of the packaging.

Manufacturing, particularly the automotive industry, has used heavy-duty returnable racks for shipping hoods, fenders, engines, dashboards, etc. from suppliers to final assembly plants. The racks are then returned for the next shipment cycle.

Bulk foods, chemicals, and pharmaceuticals are often shipped in reusable and returnable containers. These need to be carefully inspected, cleaned and sanitized as part of the reuse cycle. An effective quality management system is necessary.

Wooden pallets are often made to be expendable, for a single shipment. Others are heavy duty and intended for multiple shipments. Some are in "pallet pools" which are used, inspected, and refurbished for extended usage.

Often reusable industrial shipping containers have bar code labels or radio-frequency identification (RFID) chips to help identify and route the containers.

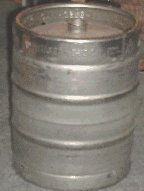
A typical keg (half-barrel) with a single opening in the center of the top end

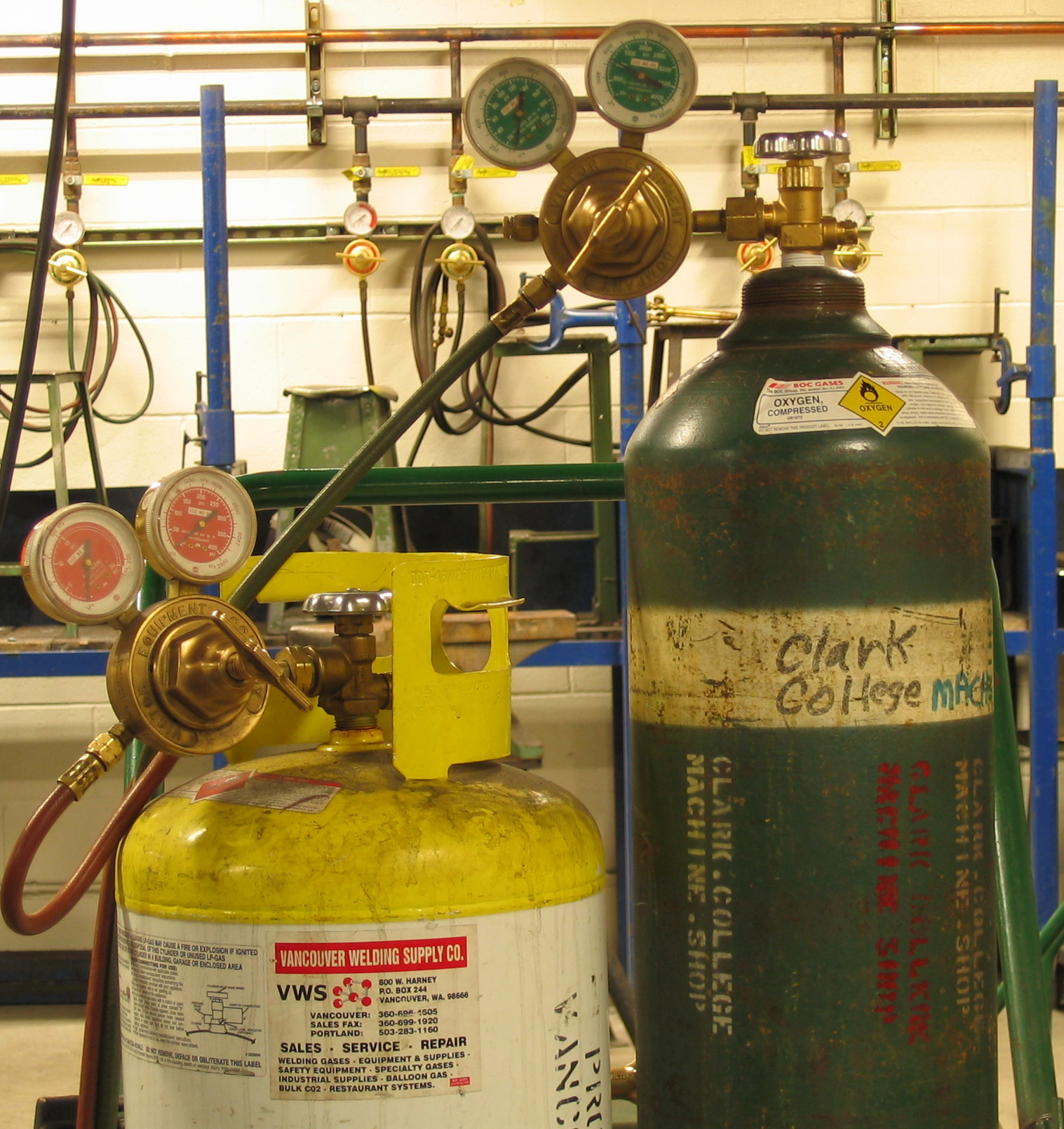
Industrial compressed gas cylinders

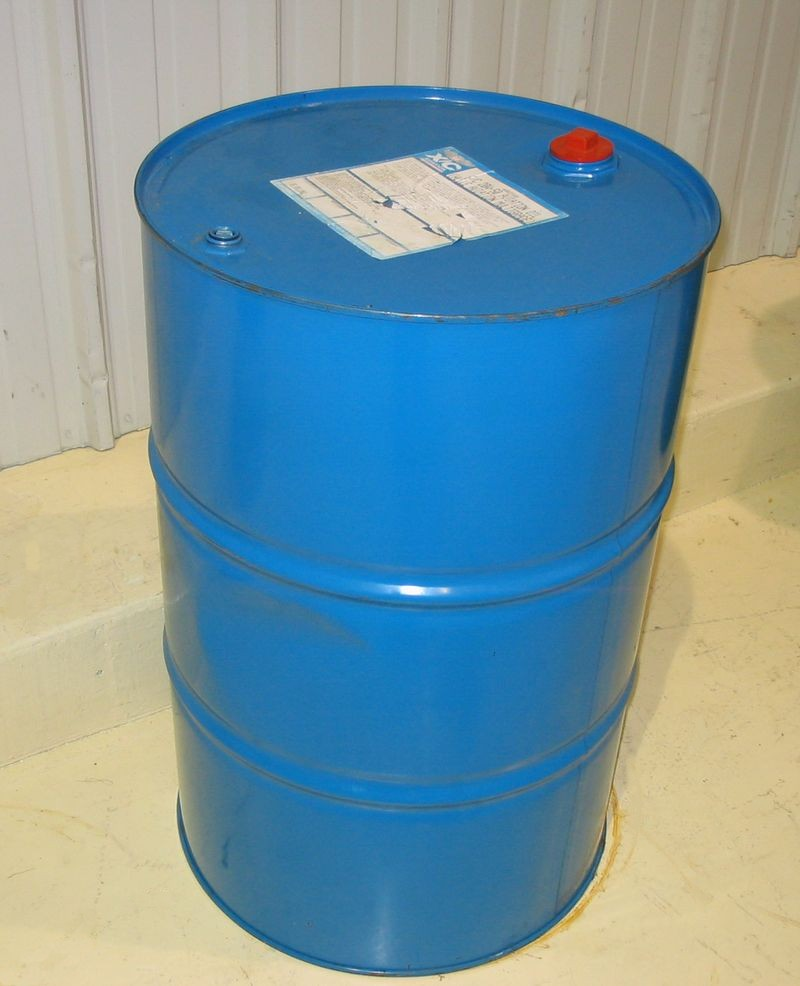
Steel drums can be reconditioned and reused

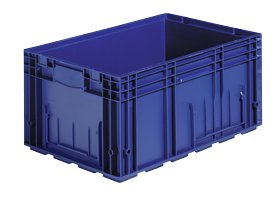
Returnable/reusable plastic tote box, Euro container

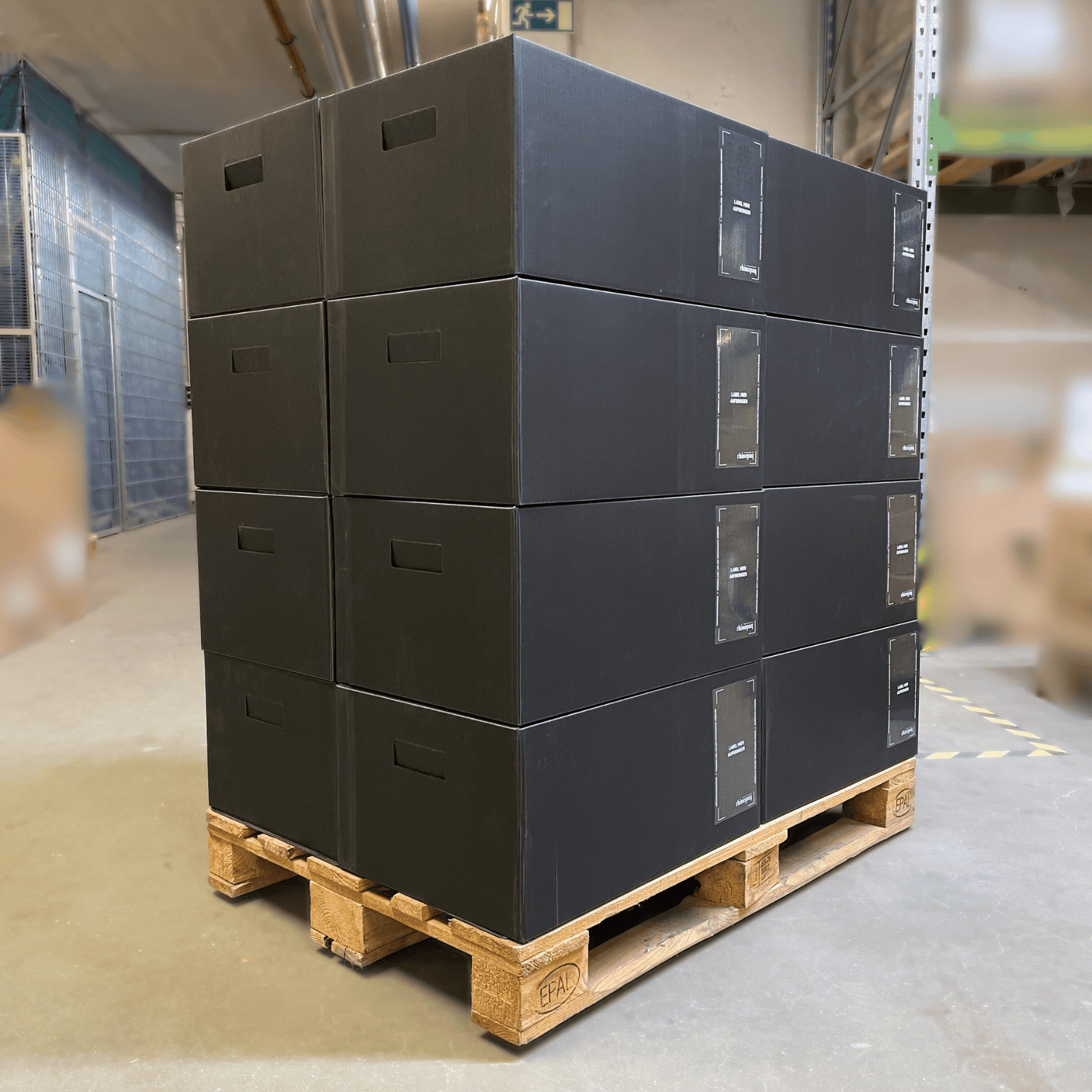
Reusable boxes for pallet shipping

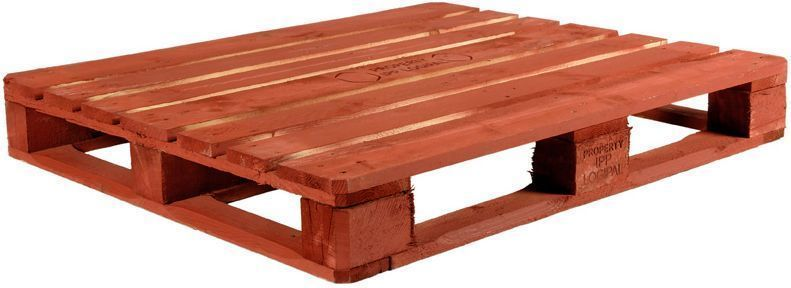
Heavy-duty reusable wooden pallet

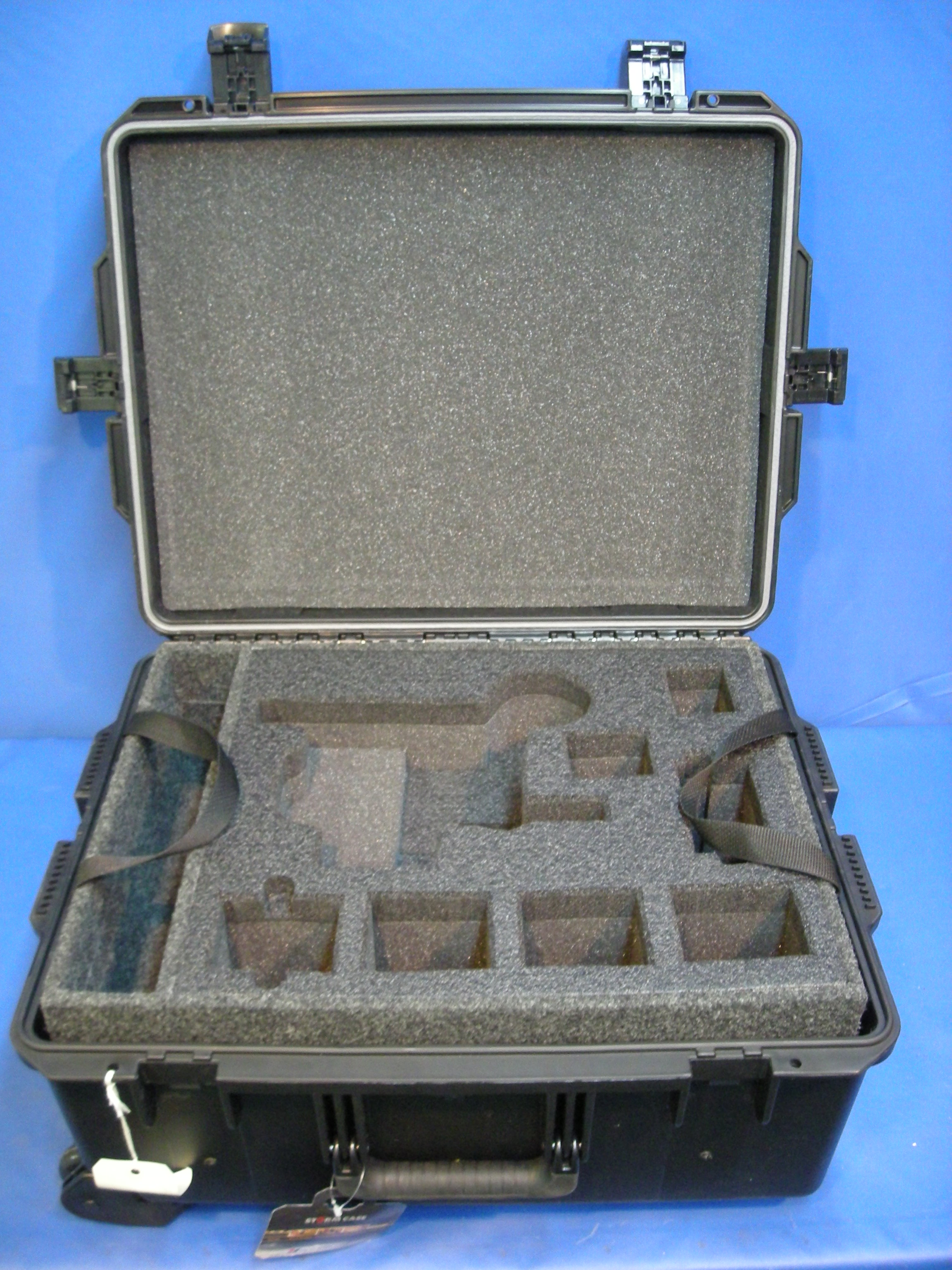
Plastic molded transit case with pre-cut foam interior

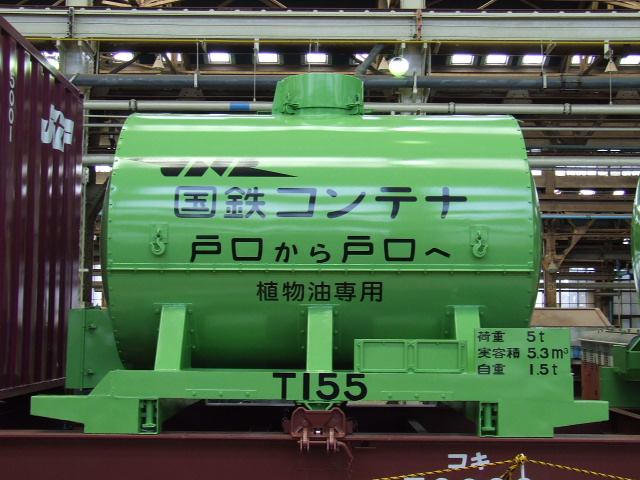
Container for bulk vegetable oil

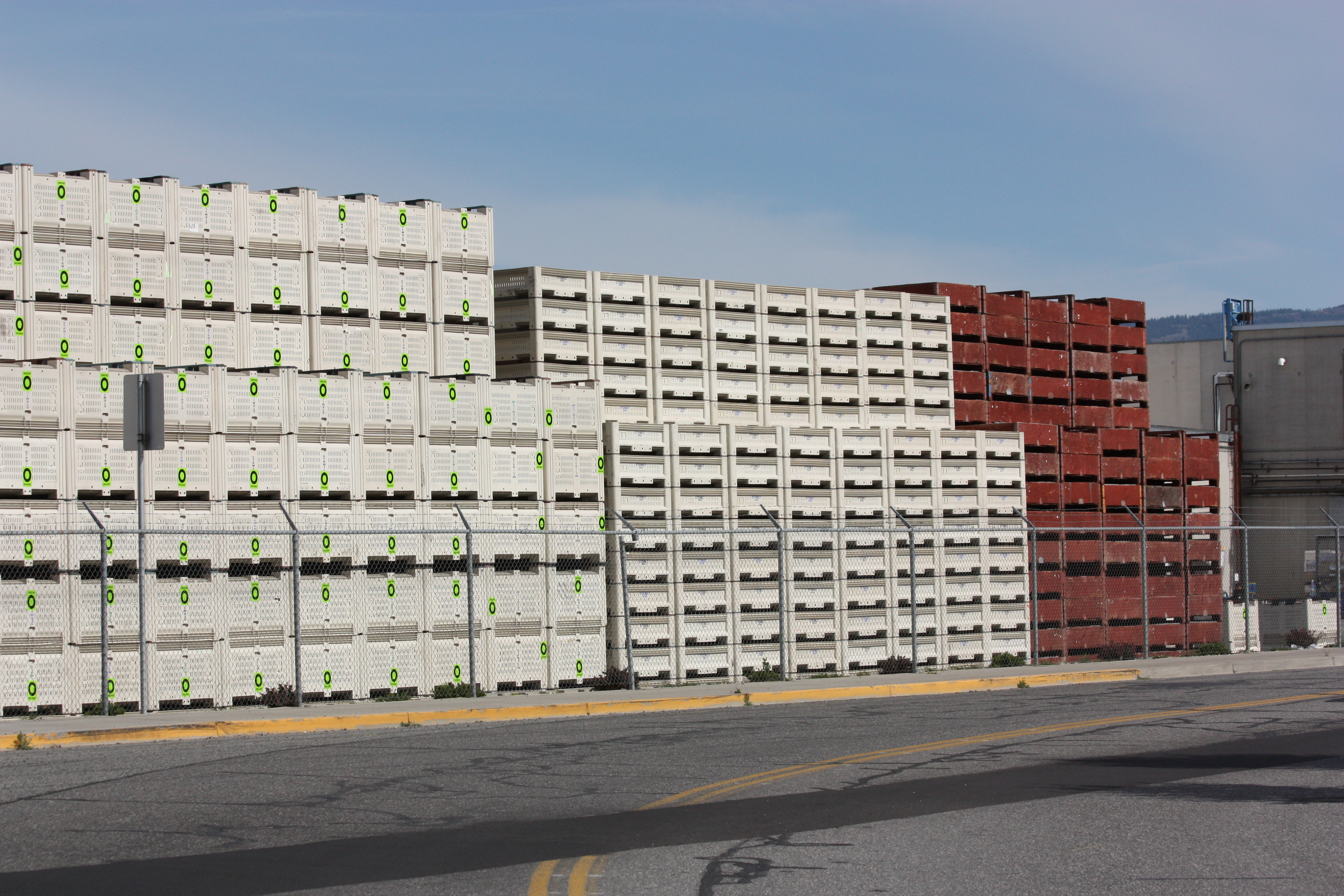
Reusable field bins for fruit

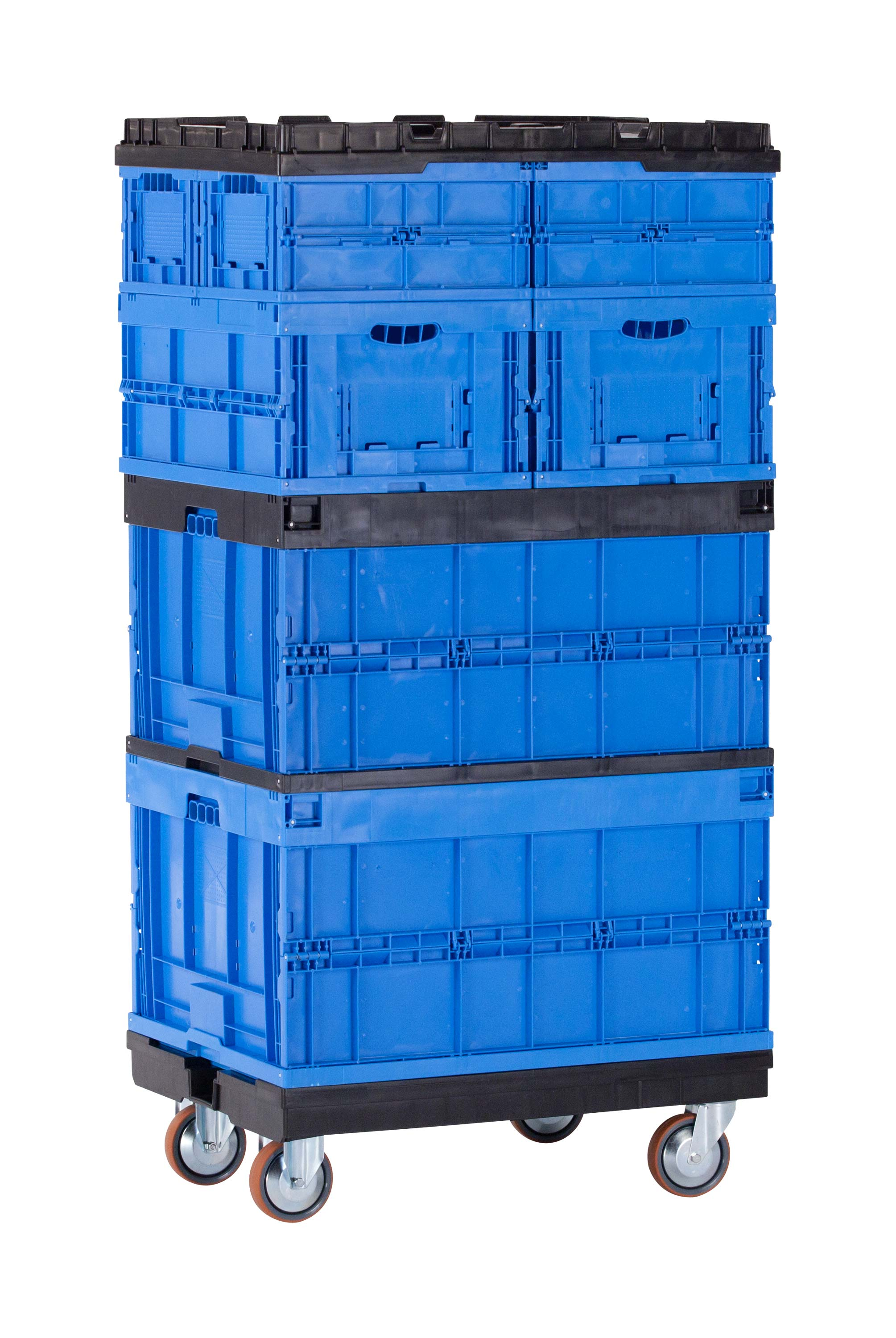
Stackable plastic containers

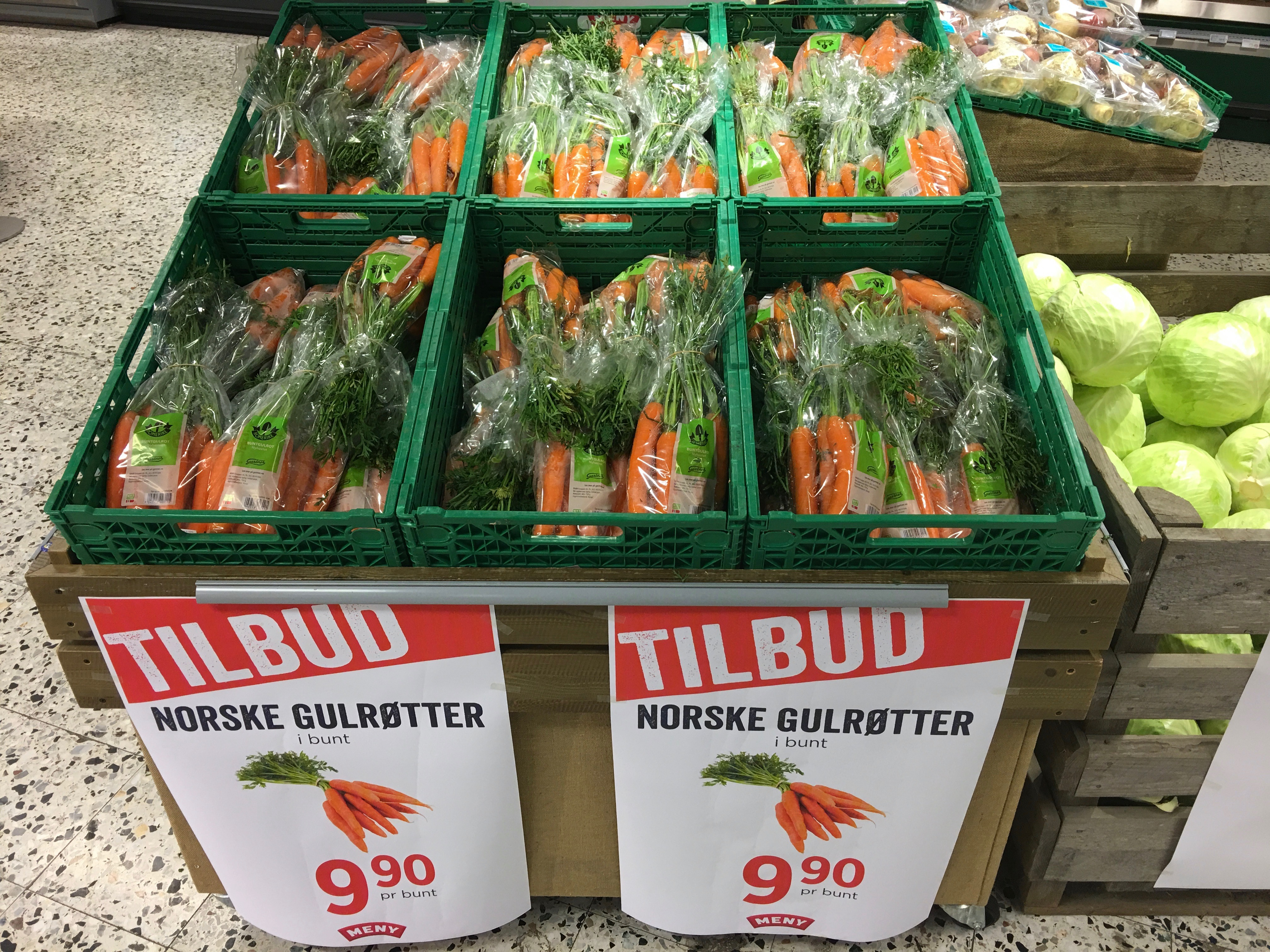
Carrots on display in returnable plastic bins

=== Use in the automotive industry ===
Automotive original equipment manufacturers (OEMs) use and encourage the use of returnable packaging to move components from their vendors to their factories. The components are placed in returnable packaging and are at times and arranged in a way that facilitates movement straight to assemble lines. Such packaging replaces traditional corrugated cartons, thereby helping companies cut costs by avoiding wastage and effort required in disposing the cartons. It also helps in reducing the environmental footprint of the automotive industry.

Other advantages of using returnable packaging include avoiding damages to parts in while in transit. Parts are at times placed in specially designed receptacles for easy picking on the assembly line contributing to fewer mistakes and simpler inventory management.

A few examples of returnable packaging in automotive industry:

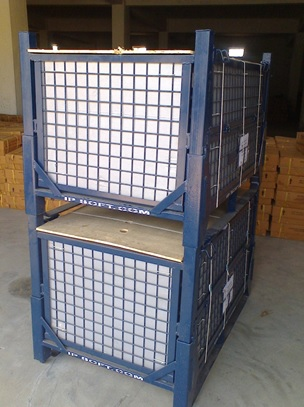
A steel cage used as reusable packaging

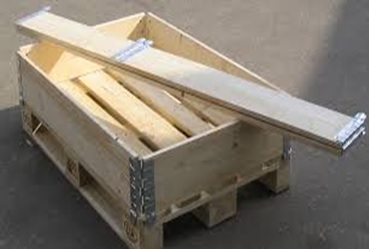
A wooden pallet collar box

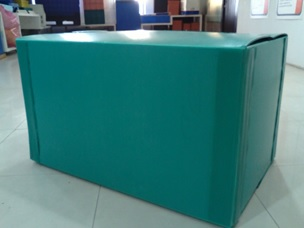
A corrugated plastic box used as reusable packing

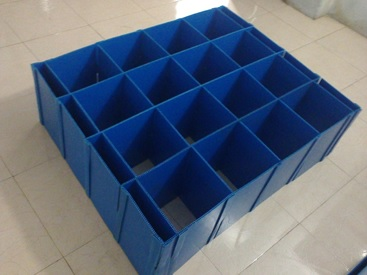
Corrugated plastic dividers used to pack automotive components

== Consumer packaging and containers ==
Several types of consumer containers have been in reuse systems. Reusable bottles for milk, soda, and beer have been part of closed-loop use-return-clean-refill-reuse cycles. Food storage containers are typically reusable. Thick plastic water bottles are promoted as an environmental improvement over thin single-use water bottles. Some plastic cups can be re-used, though most are disposable.

Home canning often uses glass mason jars which are often reused several times.

Many non-food types of containers, including reusable shopping bags, and luggage, are designed to be reused by consumers.

With any food packaging, proper cleaning and disinfecting between each use is critical to health.

In September 2019, the UK Environment, Food and Rural Affairs Committee released a report claiming that the official intervention should encourage more shops to offer refillable options instead of traditional single-use packing.

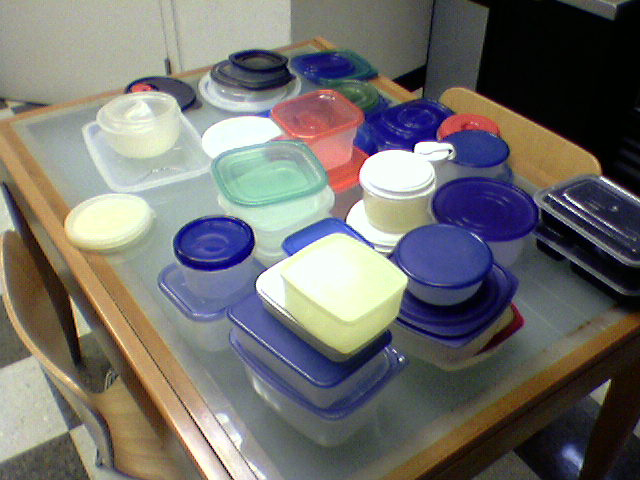
Home storage containers

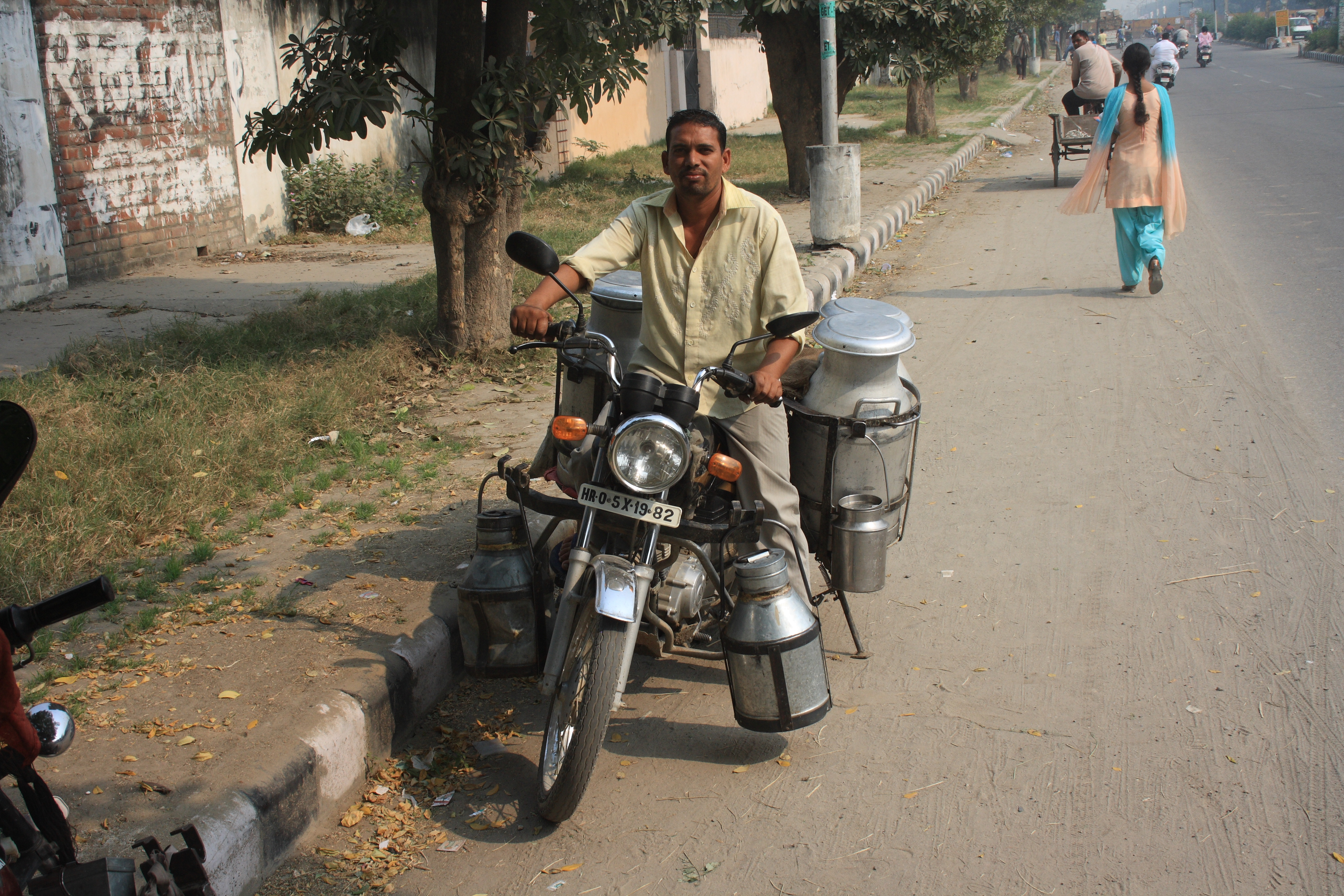
Delivering milk in India in reusable stainless steel containers

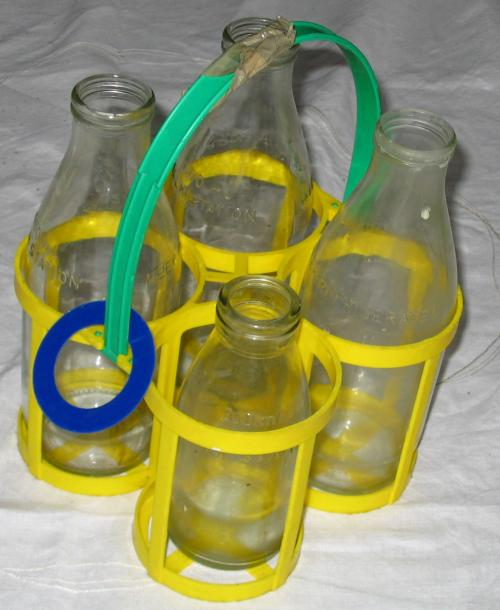
Reusable milk bottles and carrier

Reusable shopping bag

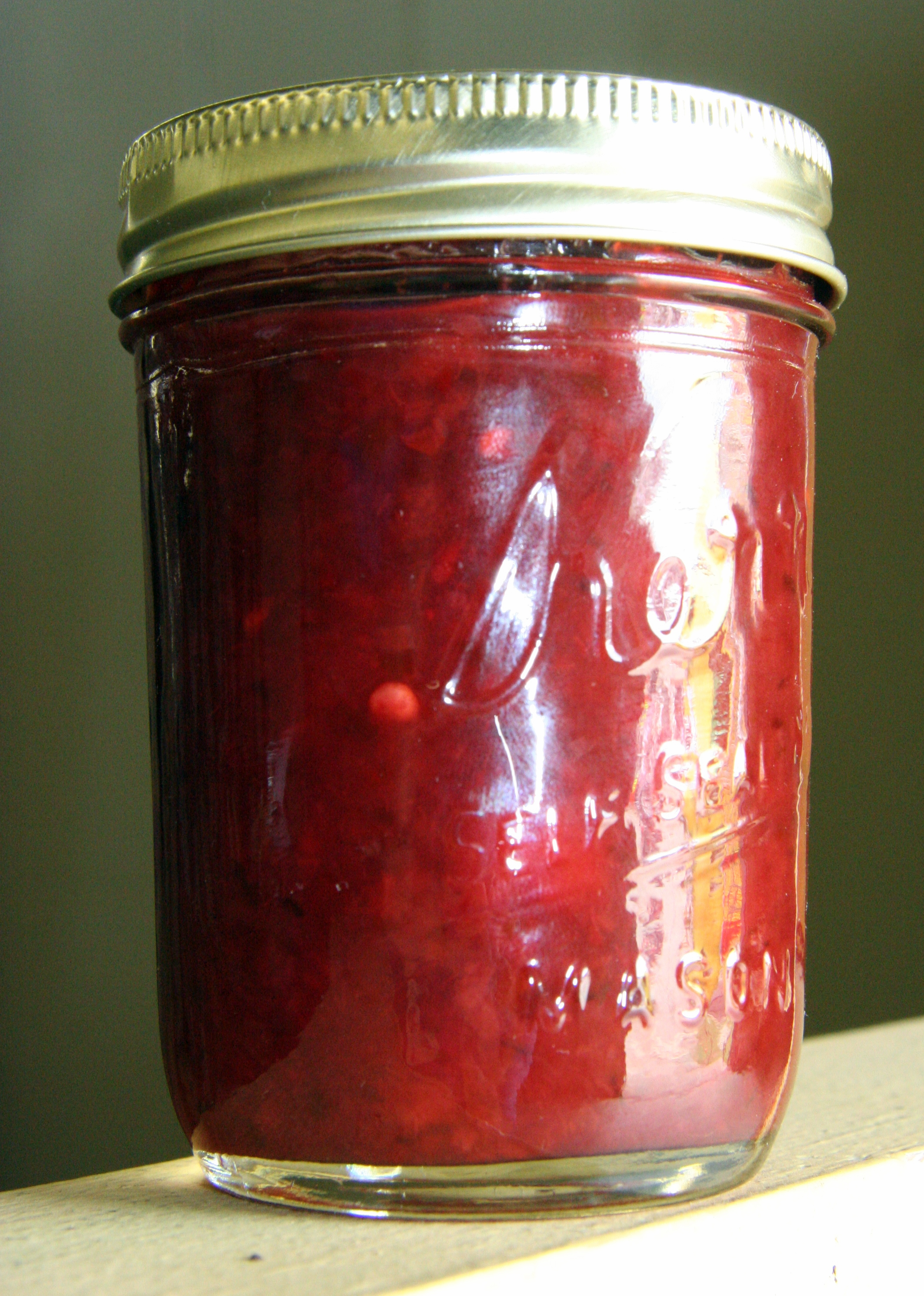
Mason jars for canning

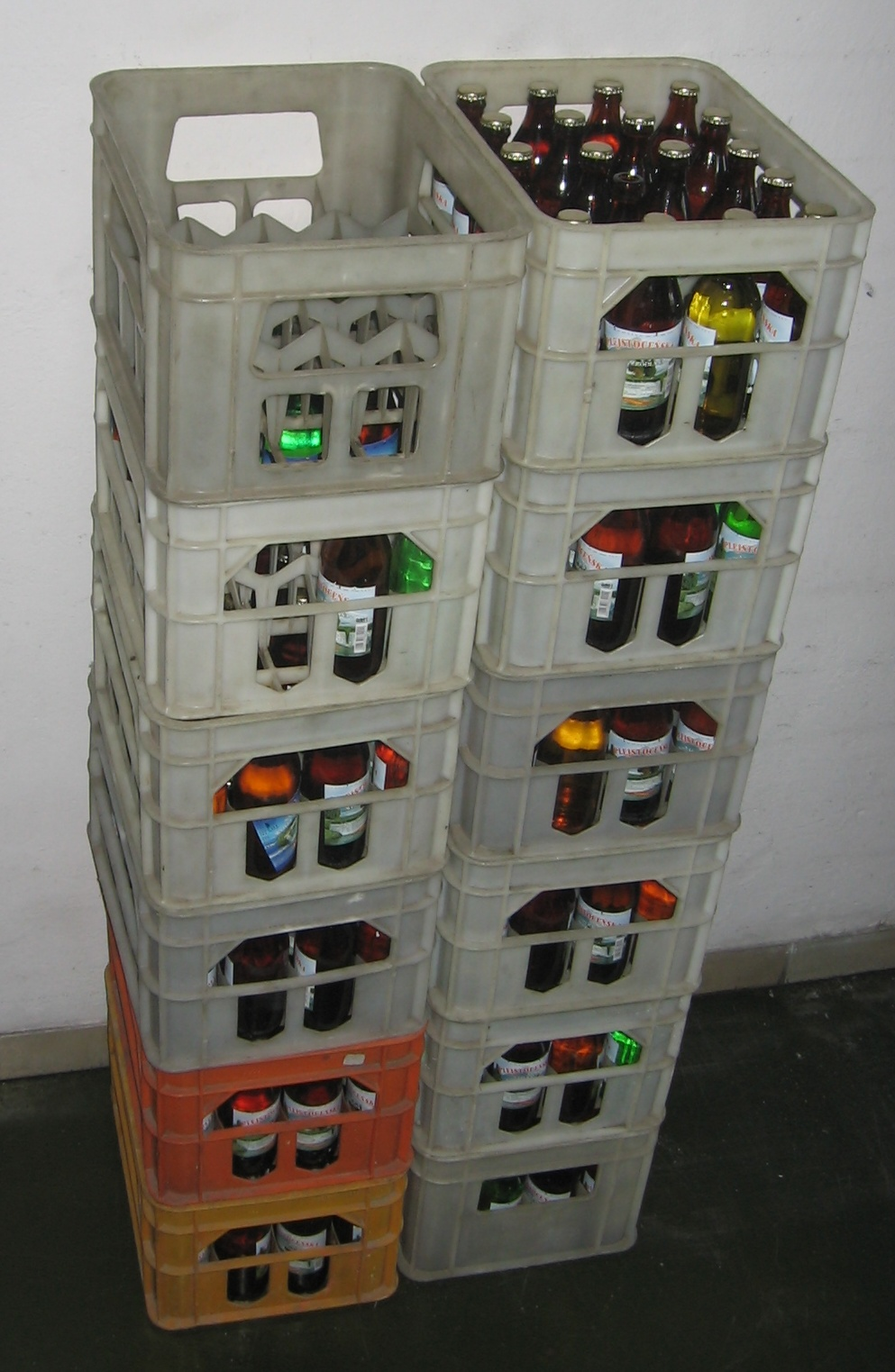
Glass bottles of mineral water in crates

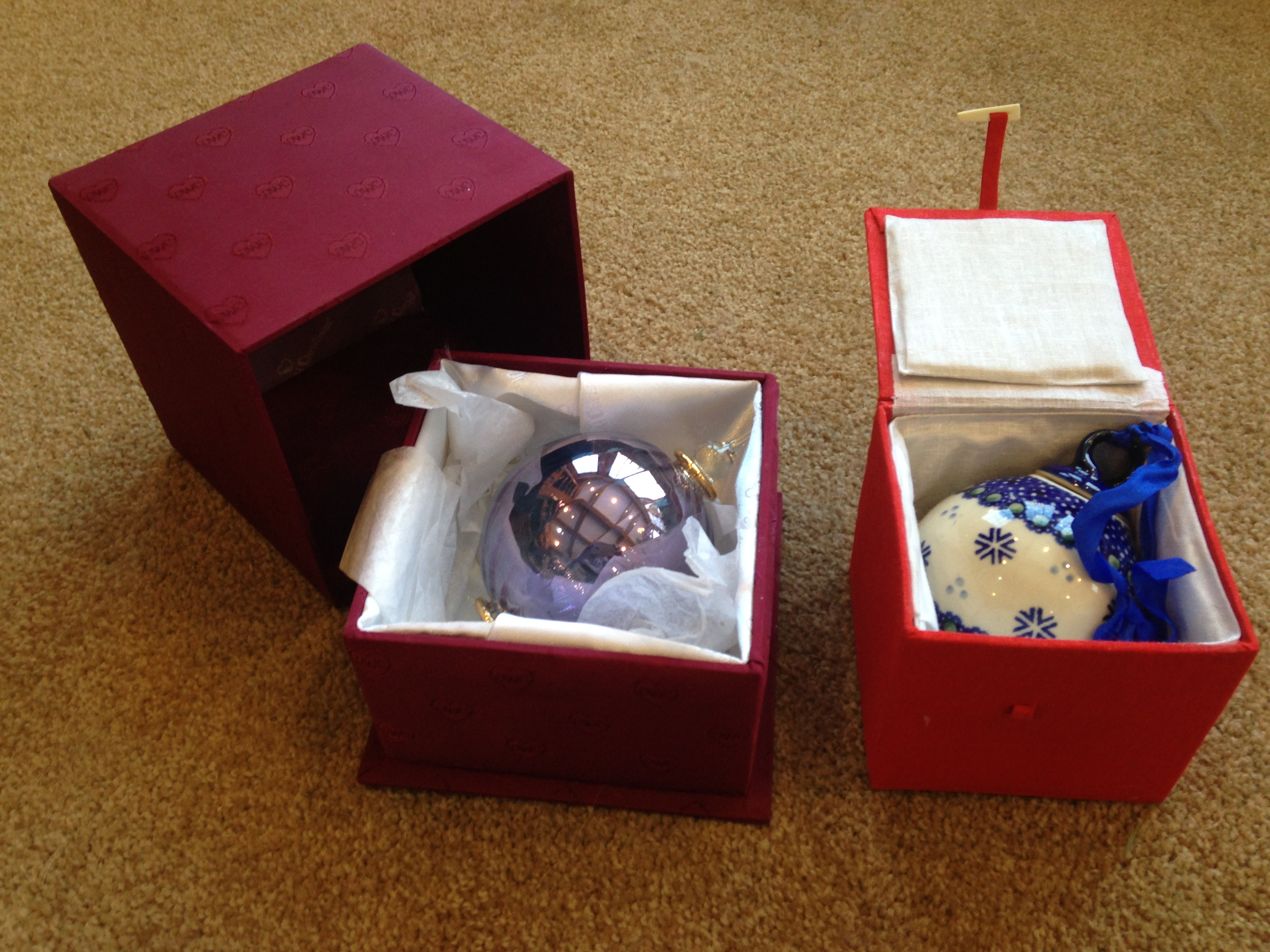
Christmas tree ornaments in storage boxes

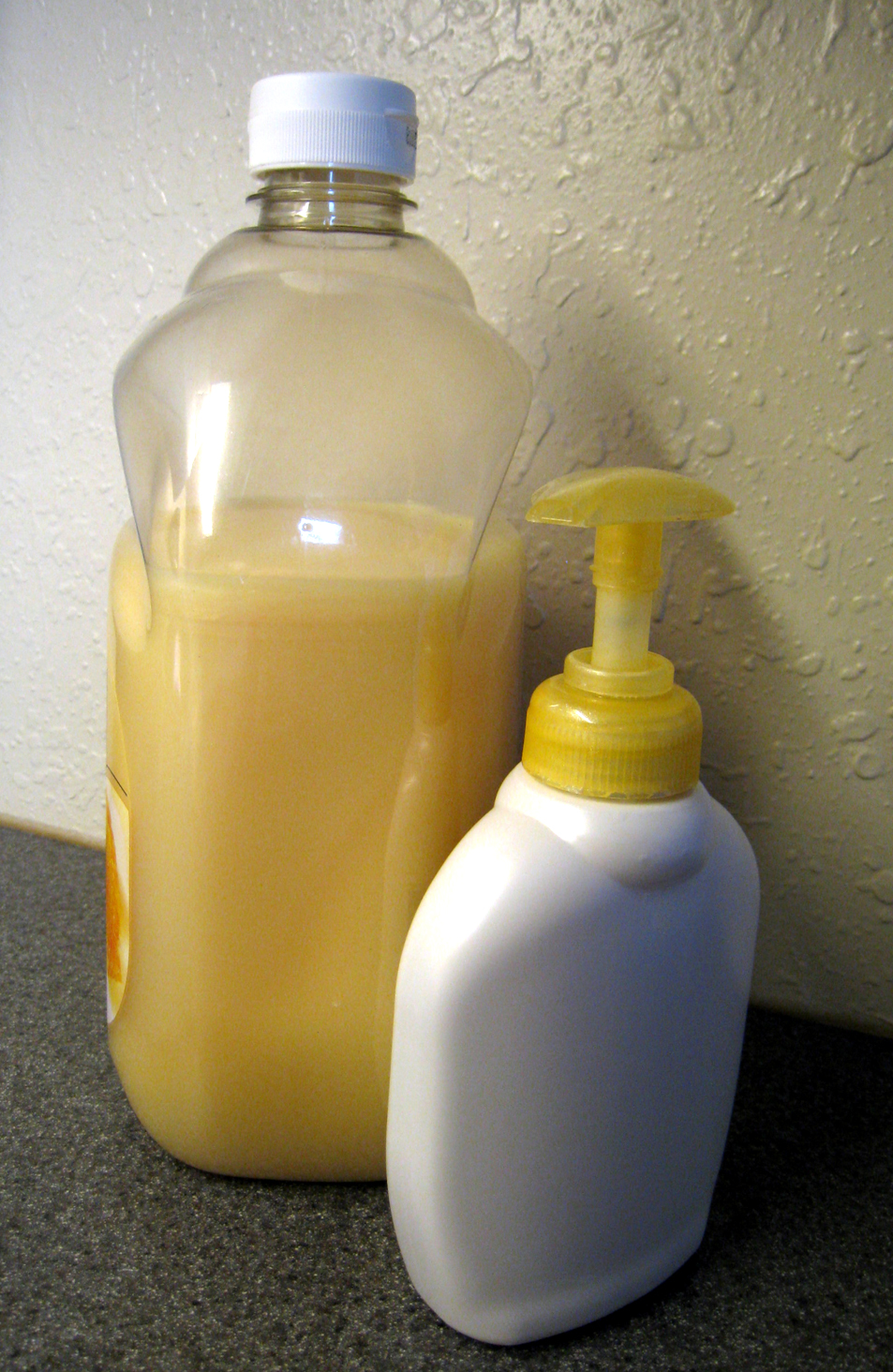
Refillable liquid soap dispenser

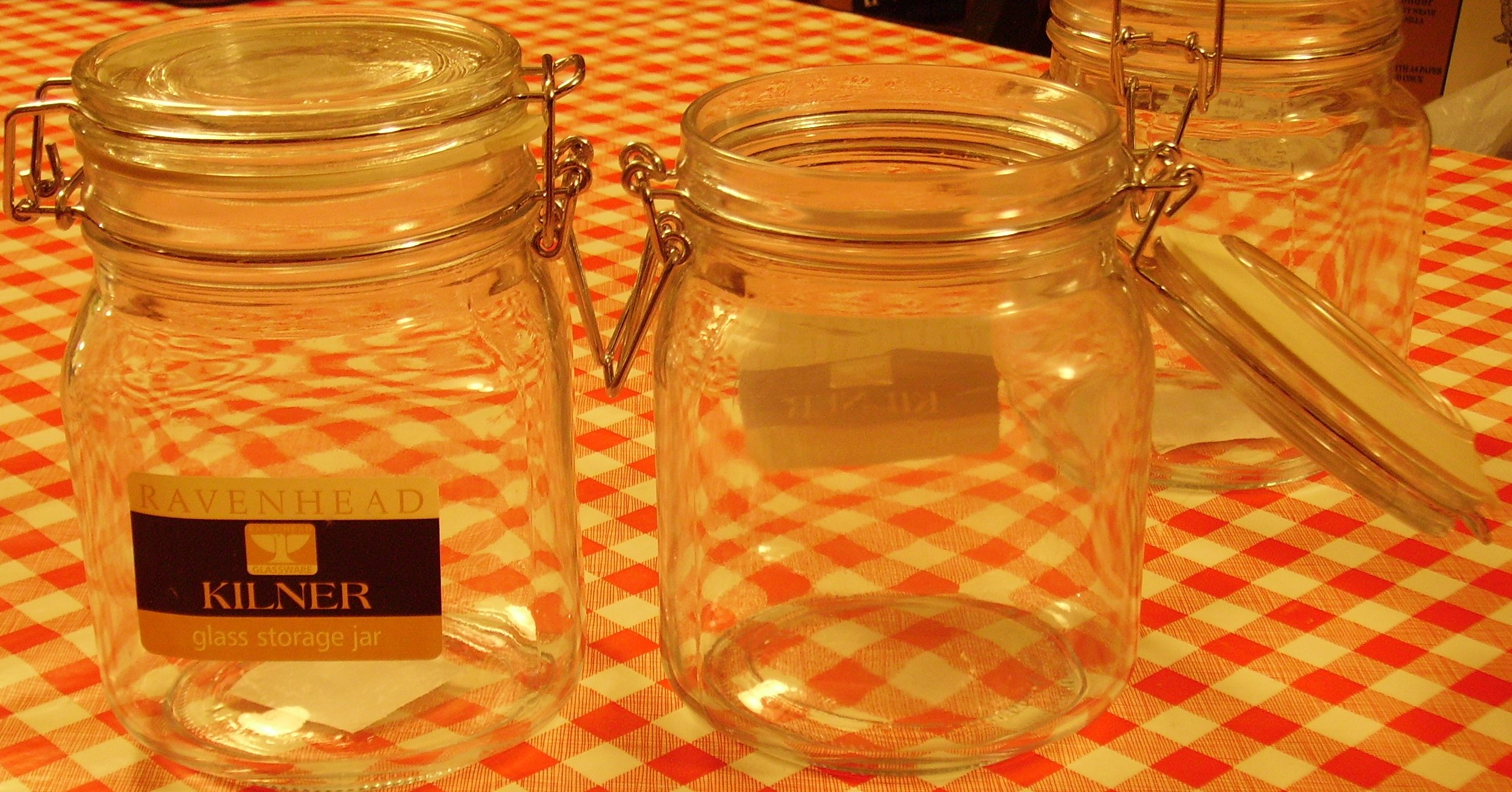
Flip-top or bail closure on storage jar

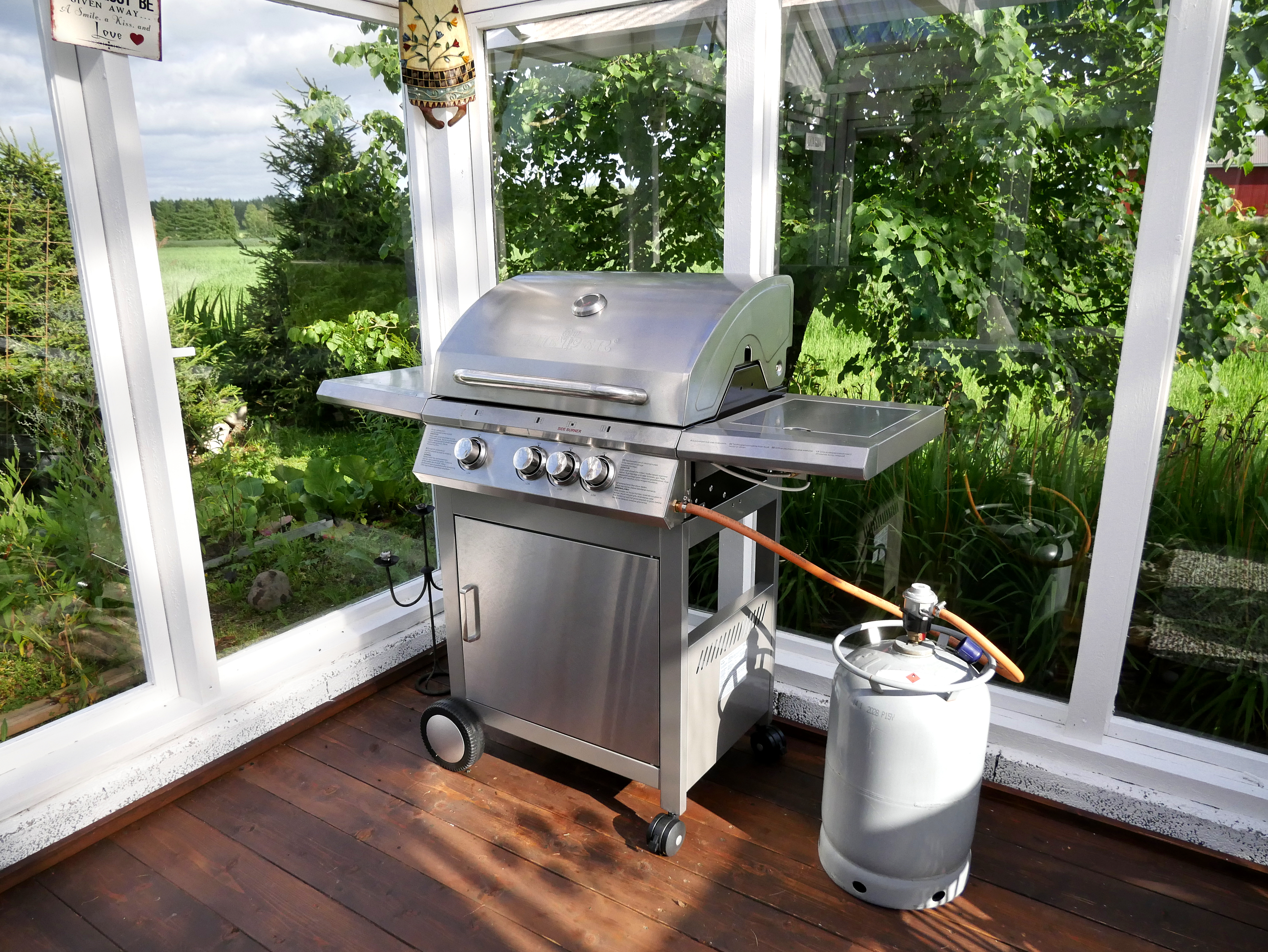
Gass grill with reusable liquefied petroleum gas cylinder

== Reuse for other purposes ==
Used packages are often reused for purposes other than their primary use. For example, a single-use plastic shopping bag might be reused as a bin bag, a household storage bag or a dog faeces bag. Steel drums can be reused as traffic barricades, dock flotation, and as musical instruments

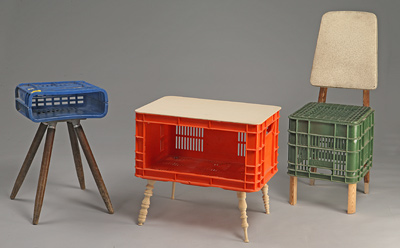
Furniture made from milk crates

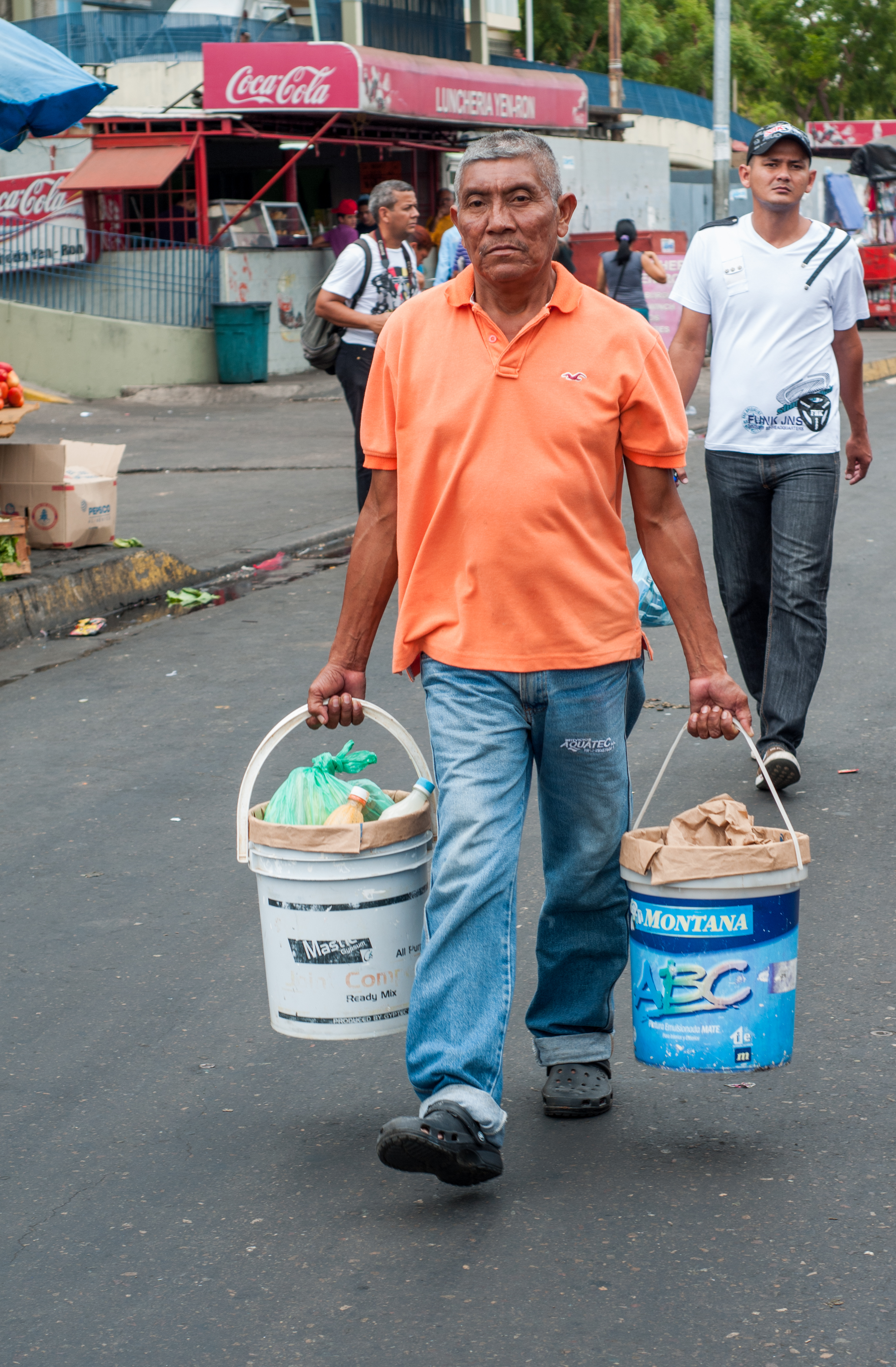
Pails being reused to carry other items

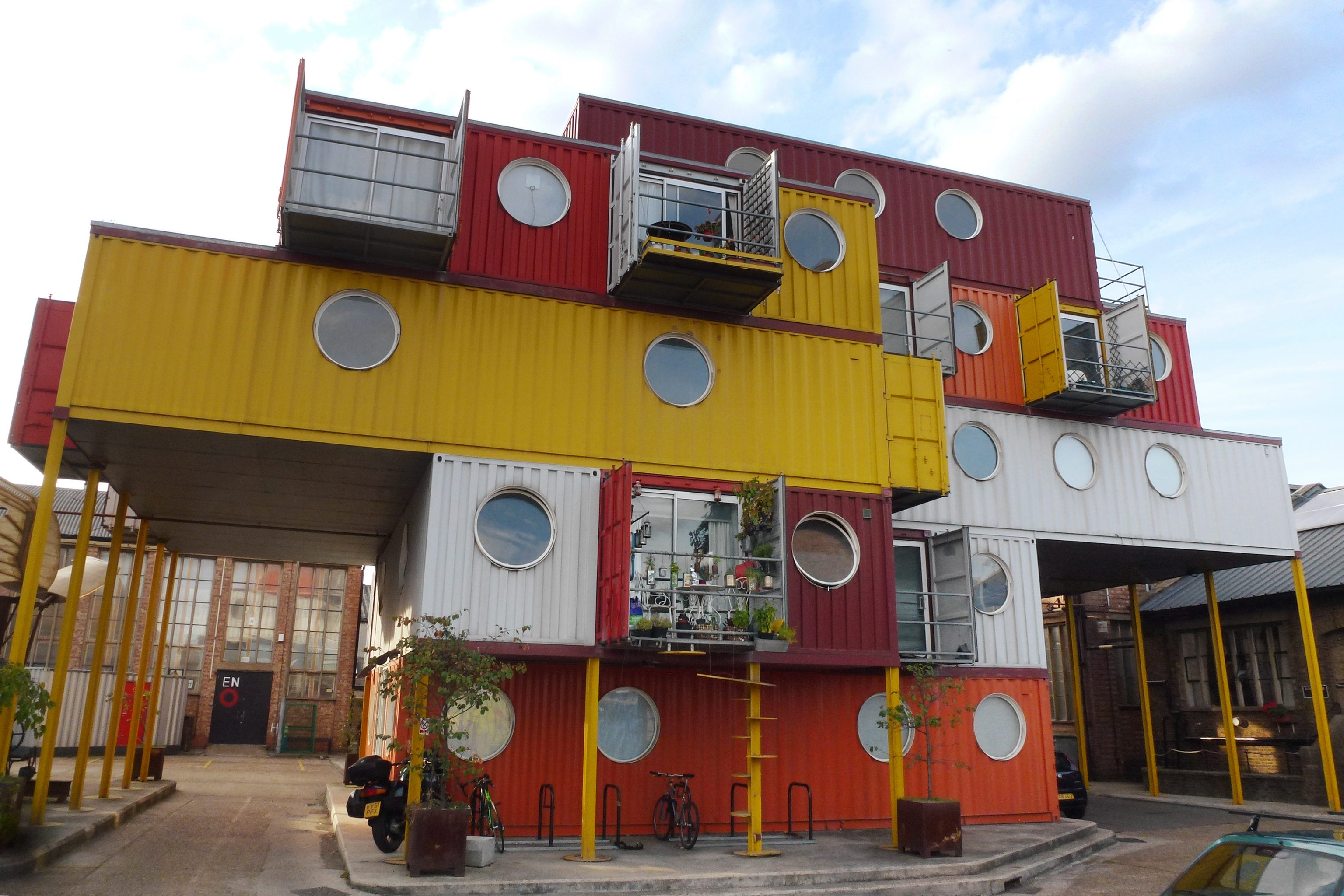
Architecture with intermodal shipping containers

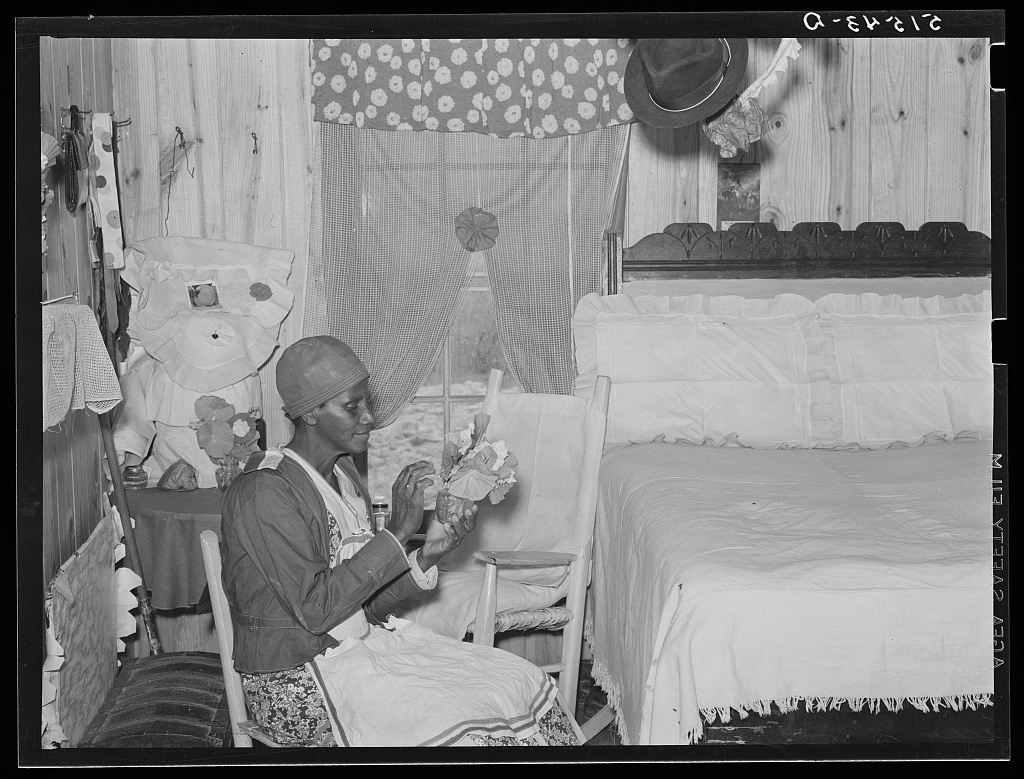
Woman sewing chair covers, bedspread, and other things made from cotton flour sacks in Alabama

== Justification ==
Reusable packaging often costs more initially and uses more and different materials than single-use packaging. It often requires adding complexity to the distribution system. Not all packaging justifies being returnable and reusable.

A thorough cost analysis is required. This involves all of the material, labor, transport, inspection, refurbishing, cleaning, and management costs. Often these costs may be incurred by different companies with different cost structures.

The environmental costs and benefits can also be complex. The material, energy, pollution, etc. needs to be accounted for throughout the entire system. A life cycle assessment offers a good methodology for this task.

A 2024 study looked at reusable food containers and single-use ones. The study found that using the same container multiple times could be better for the environment in terms of global warming. But it also depends on how the containers are cleaned and how far they need to be transported.

== See also ==
- Closed-loop box reuse, business practice where boxes or other containers are reused many times as a form of reusable packaging
- Economics of plastics processing § Reusable plastic containers, adoption of reusable plastic containers
- OpenStructures, open specification for modular interfaces in hardware based on a geometrical grid
- Pallet crafts, crafts and projects which use discarded shipping pallets
- Resealable packaging, reusable product packaging that the end user can reclose
- Reverse logistics, return processing, i.e. all operations related to the upstream movement of products and materials
- Shaker-style pantry box, round bentwood box made by hand
- Systainer, modular plastic containers for transporting power tools
- 32 mm cabinetmaking system, a standard for shelving
