= Reverse logistics =

All operations related to the reuse of products and materials

Reverse logistics encompasses all operations related to the upstream movement of products and materials. It is "the process of moving goods from their typical final destination for the purpose of capturing value, or proper disposal. Remanufacturing and refurbishing activities also may be included in the definition of reverse logistics". Environmental concerns and the development of green supply chain management practices have increased the relevance of reverse logistics.

Academic and professional interest in reverse logistics has grown considerably in recent decades. The first use of the term "reverse logistics" in a publication was by James R. Stock in a white paper titled Reverse Logistics, published by the Council of Logistics Management in 1992. The concept was further refined in subsequent publications by Stock (1998) in another Council of Logistics Management book, titled Development and Implementation of Reverse Logistics Programs, and by Rogers and Tibben-Lembke (1999) in a book published by the Reverse Logistics Association titled Going Backwards: Reverse Logistics Trends and Practices. Rogers and Tibben-Lembke focused their work on the idea that reverse logistics was not only about green and environmental issues as Stock and most of the European reverse logistics researchers were thinking at the time, but rather that utilizing reverse logistics as a tool to reclaim value from distressed assets was most important. The idea that reverse logistics could be profitable was at the time a new idea.

The reverse logistics process includes the management and the sale of surplus items, as well as returned equipment and machines, particularly from the hardware leasing business. Traditional logistics typically involves the forward movement of goods toward the customer, whereas reverse logistics refers to the backward flow of goods in the supply chain. In such cases, resources move at least one step back in the supply chain — for example, from the customer to the distributor or manufacturer.

As of 2023, the global reverse logistics market is estimated to be worth approximately $993.28 billion. This value is projected to increase at a compound annual growth rate (CAGR) of 10.34% from 2023 to 2032.

An important idea in the reverse logistics space is the development and usage of secondary markets. Rogers, Z. S., Davletshin, M., Rogers, D. S., Chen, H., Korde, R. Y., & Greve, C. (2025). Unveiling the Structure of Reverse Supply Networks: An Empirical Exploration. Journal of Business Logistics, 46(3), e70014. https://doi.org/10.1111/jbl.70014 showed that secondary markets in the U.S. amount to around 3% of GDP for the last several years. Items returned either because of consumer regret or overstocks have become an important source of supply for a large part of U.S. retailers.

== Business implications ==
In current marketplace, many retailers handle merchandise returns as isolated transactions. A significant challenge for retailers and vendors is to manage returns efficiently, ensuring the quick, accurate, and cost-effective collection and reintegration of merchandise. As customer expectations for precision and speed in returns processing continue to rise, logistics companies are increasingly responsible for minimizing the time between return initiation and resale. By implementing best practices in returns management, retailers can optimize operational efficiency while addressing customer satisfaction and retention concerns. Due to its strong link to customer retention, reverse logistics has become a key component of Service Lifecycle Management (SLM). SLM is a strategic business approach focused on enhancing customer loyalty by integrating and coordinating service-related data and processes to improve overall operational efficiency.

Reverse logistics extends beyond returns management and encompasses “activities related to returns avoidance, gatekeeping, disposal, and all other after-market supply chain issues.

Returns management, increasingly recognized for its influence on competitive positioning, serves as a vital connection between marketing and logistics. Its cross-functional nature implies that firms can benefit significantly from enhancing internal integration. In particular, the ability to respond to and plan for external influences on the returns management process is improved through effective internal coordination. A key consideration in a firm's returns planning is the residual value of the returned material and strategies to recover that value. Returned products, or components, may also be redirected to suppliers or other supply chain partners for remanufacturing.

Implementing reverse logistics, like other supply chain operations, involves inherent risks. Despite its growing relevance, research on the specific risks associated with reverse logistics operations remains limited. Panjehfouladgaran and Lim (2020) addressed this gap by introducing the concept of Reverse Logistics Risk Management (RLRM), proposing structured approaches to mitigate these challenges. According to industry data, return costs can account for up to 7% of an enterprise's gross sales, a significant expense for many businesses.Third-party logistics who often manage these returns, typically customize contracts to suit the size and operational needs of their clients. These providers generally realize profit margins between 12% and 15% on reverse logistics services. Return rates also vary by channel: approximately 8–10% of in-store (brick-and-mortar) purchases are returned, compared to about 20% of online (E-commerce) purchases. In the United States alone, return deliveries were projected to cost $550 billion in 2020. December is traditionally the busiest month for reverse logistics in the United States, with UPS processing over 1 million returned packages daily through Christmas.

Research on reverse logistics indicates that 84.6% of companies in the United States use the secondary market, with 70% viewing it as a competitive advantage." A study conducted in Taiwan identified three primary factors influencing the adoption of reverse logistics in businesses: economic, environmental, and social needs.The research, which surveyed 12 environmental management experts from Taiwanese electronics firms, found that economic needs were the most influential, with an importance weight of 0.4842. Environmental needs followed with a weight of 0.3728, while social needs were considered less significant, with a weight of 0.1430.

The economic motivation for reverse logistics in the United States is often driven by the potential to recover value from returned goods. In contrast, a study from Taiwan suggests that the significance of environmental concerns is influenced by global waste management practices, particularly in developed regions such as the European Union, Japan, and the United States. For instance, the European Union's Waste Electrical and Electronic Equipment (WEEE) Directive holds producers responsible for the collection, treatment, recycling, and recovery of electrical and electronic waste.

== Return of unsold goods ==
In certain industries, particularly those dealing with perishable or time-sensitive products such as newspapers and magazines, goods are often supplied to downstream members of the supply chain with the agreement that unsold items may be returned for credit. This arrangement serves as an incentive for retailers and distributors to stock larger quantities, as the risk of unsold inventory is assumed by upstream suppliers. However, this practice also introduces specific risks. Downstream partners may overorder intentionally, knowing they can return unsold goods, thereby enhancing their service levels without bearing the associated inventory risks. In effect, suppliers absorb the financial burden of excess stock. Consequently, it is crucial for suppliers to monitor customer accounts carefully to identify and account for any hidden costs that may arise from such return agreements.

== Reusable packaging ==
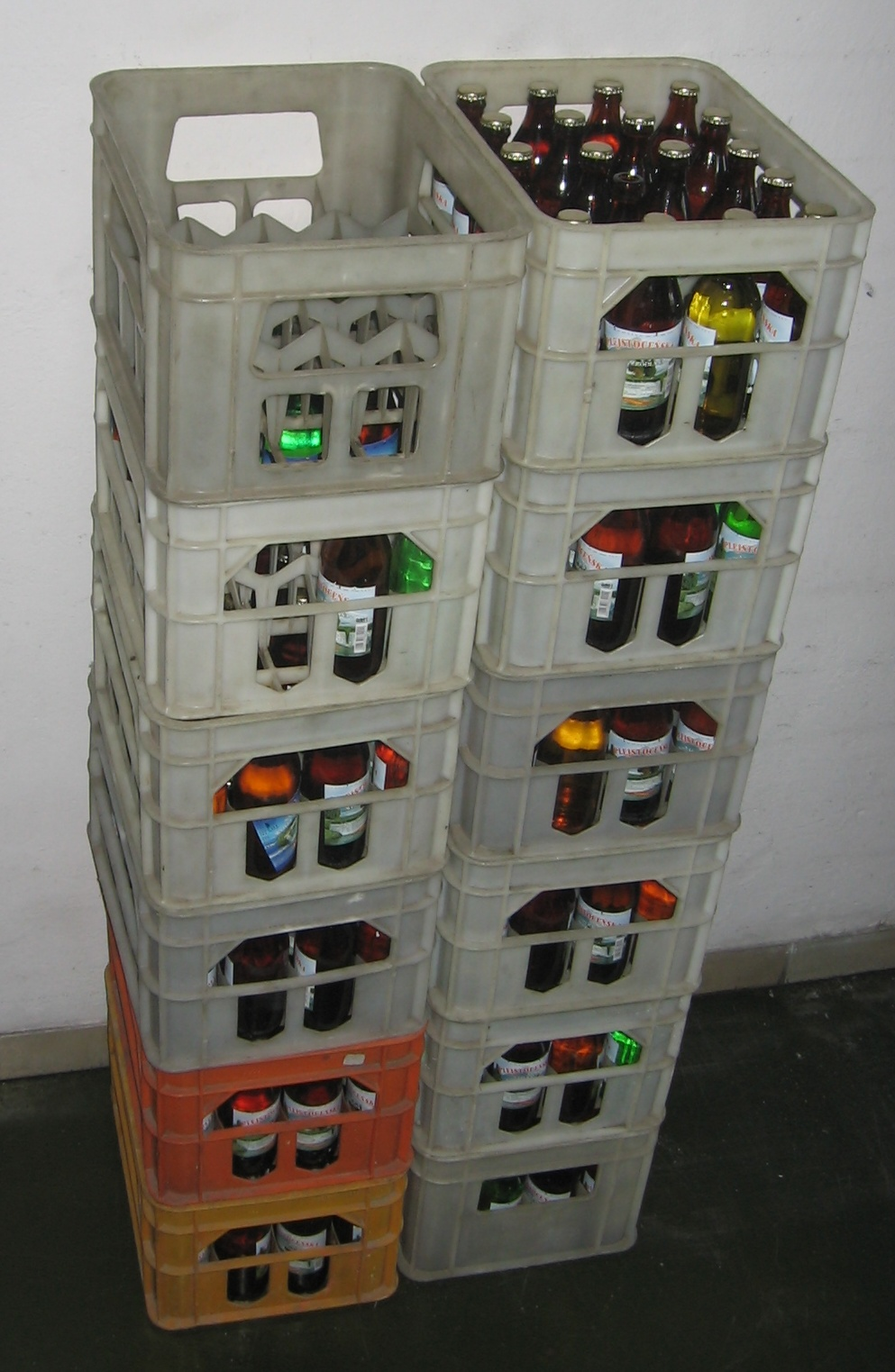
Reusable mineral water bottles in crates

Reusable packaging systems require a closed-loop logistics system. Examples include reusable pallets, bulk boxes such as Euro containers, reusable bottles for milk, soda, and beer, compressed gas cylinders, beer kegs.

== Refusal of the products in the cash on delivery (COD) ==
In e-commerce, many websites offer the option of cash on delivery (COD) to customers. Occasionally, customers refuse to accept the product at the time of delivery since there is no prior commitment to take it. Then the logistics service provider follows the process of reverse logistics on the refused cargo. When this occurs, the logistics service provider initiates the reverse logistics process for the refused shipment, commonly known as Return to Origin (RTO). During this process, the e-commerce company returns the refused goods to its inventory after conducting quality checks according to the company's standards.
