= BCRS =

BCRS may refer to:

- Barycentric celestial reference system, a coordinate system used in astrometry to specify the location of astronomical objects
- Beverage Container Refund Scheme, a reverse vending machine scheme in Malta
- Beverage Container Return Scheme, a reverse vending machine scheme in Singapore
- Bureau of Clinician and Recruitment Service, a part of the United States Department of Health and Human Services
