= Maxim Kaplevich =

Russian-born technology entrepreneur

- Born: Moscow, Russia
- Education: Moscow State University
- Occupation: Entrepreneur
- Known for: Founder of Sparklo

Maxim Kaplevich is a tech entrepreneur who has founded and served as the chief executive officer of clean-technology company Sparklo since 2022.

== Life and career ==
Maxim Kaplevich was born in Moscow, Russia. He graduated from the Faculty of Economics at Lomonosov Moscow State University.

After graduation, Kaplevich worked on several projects, including Junto, a U.S.-based web development studio.

In 2022, Kaplevich founded Sparklo, a reverse vending machines manufacturer based in the United Arab Emirates. The company manufactures and services AI-based reverse vending machines called Sparklomats to accept plastic bottles and aluminum cans for further recycling, and develops a connected digital application.

In 2021, Kaplevich was included in Forbes's "30 Under 30" list in the Social Practices category. In 2023, he was named to the Forbes Middle East "30 Under 30" list in the Social Impact category.
