= Infinitum =

Infinitum may refer to:

- Infinity, the mathematical concept
- Infinitum AS, Norwegian recycling operator
- Mexican internet provider Infinitum; see Telmex
- PowerUp Forever, a video game that was mistakenly announced as Infinitum in the original press release.
