= Kjell Olav A. Maldum =

Norwegian entrepreneur and business leader

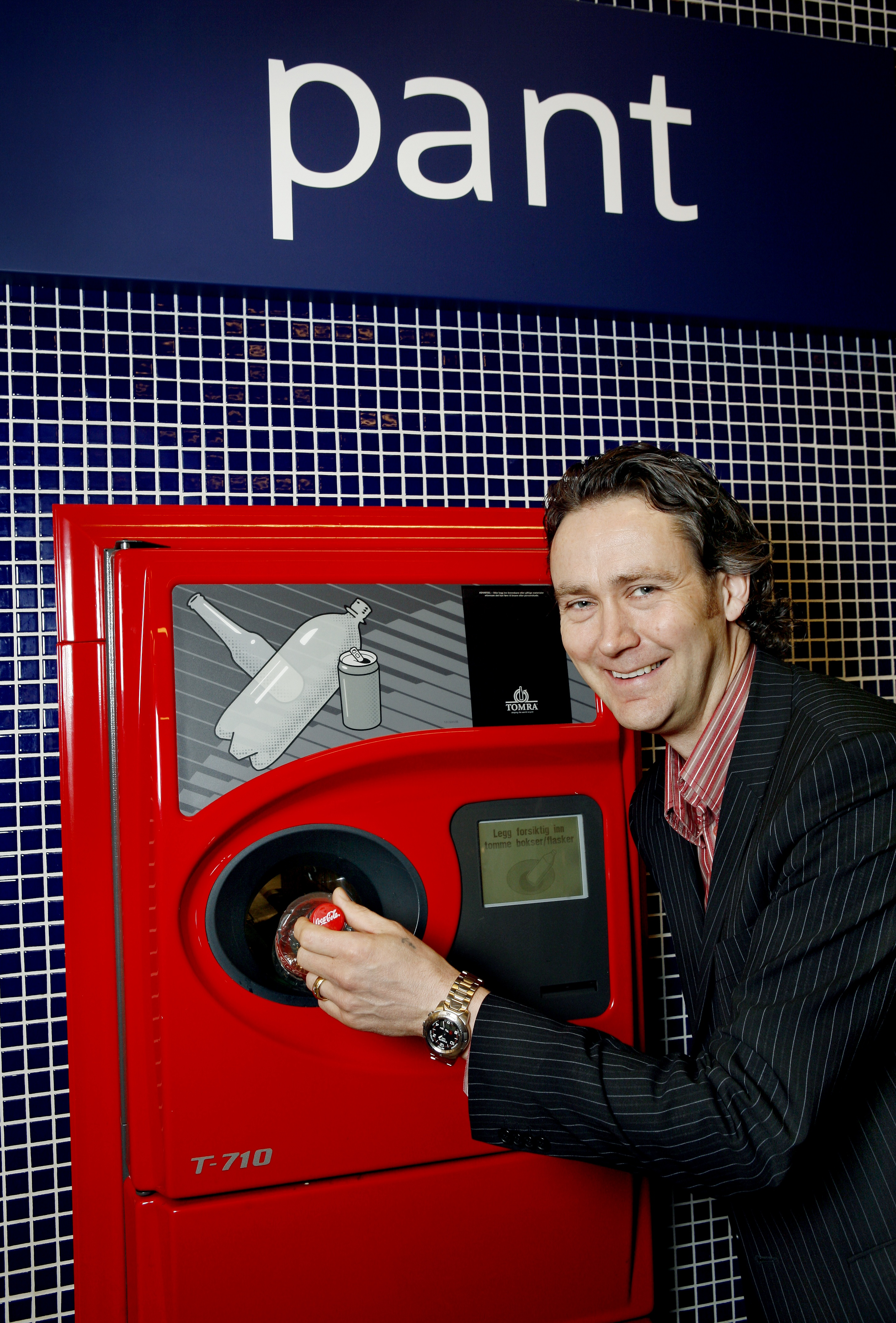
- Born: December 7, 1962 (age 63); Oslo, Norway
- Education: NTNU
- Years active: 1980–present
- Title: CEO and Chairman of Infinitum AS
- Board member of: Loop, Infinitum, DMF, Green Dot

Kjell Olav A. Maldum (born 12 December 1962) is a Norwegian entrepreneur and businessman. He is a public figure in the Norwegian movement for bottle recycling, an equivalent to bottle bill in the US and cash for container in Australia. Since 2007, he has been the CEO and Chairman of Infinitum AS, the operator of the national paid recycling scheme for bottles and cans marked with the official "recyclable" or "deposit" logo in Norway.

== Early career ==
Being a graduated from NTNU in Trondheim, Maldum has worked in different technical and leadership positions before being appointed as CEO of Infinitum in 2007. He has been a Department Manager at National Institute of Technology (Norway) Teknologisk Institutt 1990-2000, and CEO of Groceries' Environmental Forum or DMF (DAGLIGVAREHANDELENS MILJØFORUM in Norwegian) 2001–2007

== Advocating for environment ==
Maldum is especially engaged in packaging optimizing and circular economy. His commitment has led Infinitum to be the first deposit-return-scheme in the Nordics to recycle plastic bottles within its own country border. The Norwegian deposit-return scheme has gained significant international interest. Maldum welcomes international delegations to the sorting facility, and provides information on the benefits and how to implement similar models in other countries.

In 2006 he won the Optimization Award of the year in Norway. It was the first time that a person won the award instead of an entity, awarded for "his extensive efforts to ensure that the retail sector have optimal logistics and thus be the most environmentally friendly".

== Special initiatives ==
- Coca-Cola switching to deposit bottles

Until 2014 Coca-Cola has been using non-deposit bottle for its beverages in Norway. Kjell Olav Maldum played a central role in negotiations for Coca-Cola Norway switching from non-deposit refillable bottles to non-refillable deposit bottles. The move was considered as an environmentally friendly one to introduce deposit on bottles and decrease littering, but it also led to downsizing of Coca-Cola in Norway due to less labor needed for one-way bottles and made headline in Norwegian market about the job losses and also counter-arguments Coca-Cola Norway also promised to invest in recycling facilities inside Norway.

- Recycling cans in Norway

Maldum was also behind the efforts that finally led to the recycling of aluminum cans performed in Norway. The aluminum cans that have been collected in Norway were used to be sent to France for recycling but it has been recycled by Norsk Hydro in Holmestrand since 2014. The move was considered as environmentally friendly step vowing for recycling 60,000 mt of aluminium annually in Holmestrand.
