= Tomra =

Norwegian multinational corporation

TOMRA
- Type: Public
- Traded as: OSE: TOM
- ISIN: NO0005668905
- Industry: Conglomerate
- Founded: 1972
- Headquarters: Asker, Norway; 59°49′30.22″N 10°23′57.69″E
- Key people: Tove Andersen (President and CEO), Johan Hjertonsson (Chairman)
- Products: Reverse vending machines and sensor-based sorting equipment for food, recycling and mining.
- Revenue: ▲NOK 8.596 billion (2018)
- Total assets: ▲NOK 9.595 billion (end 2018)
- Total equity: ▲NOK 5.077 billion (end 2018)
- Number of employees: ▲4,025 (end 2018)
- Subsidiaries: 90+
- Website: tomra.com

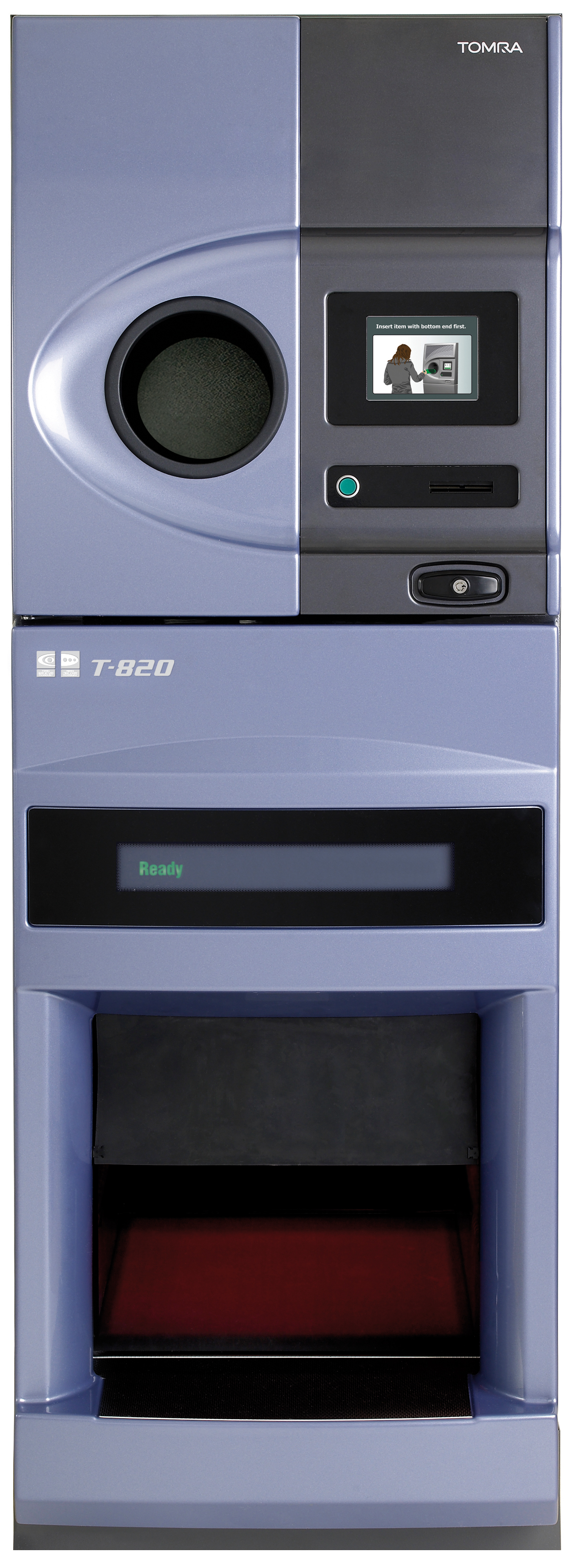
A TOMRA T-820 BC (Bottle and Crate) machine.

TOMRA is a Norwegian multinational corporation manufacturing collection and sorting products, such as reverse vending machines for bottles and cans recycling, as well as machines for the food, recycling, and mining industries. With over 91,000 (RVMs) installed, 15,500 food sorters and 11,000 recycling systems worldwide, TOMRA is the market leader in its industries.

TOMRA is listed on the Oslo Stock Exchange (OSEBX) under the ticker symbol TOM. The parent company, Tomra Systems ASA, is headquartered in Asker, Norway, with central departments located in Mülheim-Kärlich, Germany and Shelton, Connecticut.

== History ==
=== 1970s ===
TOMRA was founded by the two brothers Tore Planke and Petter Planke in 1972. It started out with the design, manufacturing and sale of reverse vending machines (RVMs) for automated collection of used beverage containers. In 1974, the Swedish entity Systembolaget ordered 100 RVMs.

=== 1980s–2000s ===
TOMRA was listed in Oslo Børs on 18 January 1985 and tried to secure a position in the American market to no avail. It then entered the market in 1990s. By 1999, sales in the US accounted for more than half of total revenues. In 2006, TOMRA delivered more than 8000 new reverse vending systems to Germany.

TOMRA's sensor-based sorting technology business was first established in 2004 with the acquisition of TiTech Visionsort AS, a provider of optical recognition and sorting technology (which was renamed to Tomra Sorting Solutions in 2012), from Ferd AS for 219 million NOK.

With the acquisition of Orwak in 2005, TOMRA added compaction and baling products. In December 2014, TOMRA sold the Orwak operations in Norway, Sweden, Poland and Japan under the name TOMRA Compaction to San Sac Nordic AB of Sweden.

On 31 August 2005, TOMRA Latasa Reciclagem S.A., offering aluminium can collection and recycling assets services in Brazil, Chile, and Argentina, was acquired by Aleris International, Inc.

On 1 July 2006, TOMRA's subsidiary Titech Visionsort AS acquired Germany-based CommoDaS GmbH, a provider of recognition and sorting technology for metals, plastics, glass, minerals and gems, for approximately 100 million NOK.

On 1 July 2008 TOMRA announced it bought Australian peer Ultrasort Group, a provider of advanced recognition and sorting technology to the mining industry, for 160 million NOK ($31.48 million).

=== 2010–2019 ===
Via several acquisitions, TOMRA had secured 75% global market share in RVMs, 60% in material recovery and 40–65% in sorting.

On 12 December 2010, TOMRA's subsidiary TiTech acquired Dublin-based food technology company Odenberg, a designer of equipment used for producing 65 per cent of all French fries worldwide, for up to €57.5 million from ACT Venture Capital in Dublin and members of the Van den Bergh family in Belgium; Odenberg's chilling/freezing unit was later considered a non-core business and sold in 2013 to a newly formed company, Power Food Technology Ltd., of Ireland.

On 31 December 2011, TOMRA sold the assets of Tomra Pacific, Inc., a recycler of used beverage containers in California, to rePlanet, LLC for approximately $25 million.

In June 2012, TOMRA purchased Belgium-based food sorting specialist Best Kwadraat for €138 million.

In October 2016 TOMRA signed an agreement to acquire Compac Holding Ltd., a New Zealand-based provider of packing house automation systems that sort fresh produce based on weight, size, shape, color, surface blemishes, and internal quality, for $70 million plus up to $230 million in earn-outs available to Compac founders; the transaction was completed in March 2017.

On 26 February 2018, TOMRA signed an agreement to acquire BBC Technologies. The deal added BBC Technologies' precision grading systems and punnet and clamshell filling technology for blueberries and other small fruits.

=== 2020– ===
In September 2025, TOMRA agreed to acquire CLYNK for $45 million, a Portland, Maine based bagged can redemption operator.

== Competition law compliance ==
In 2001, the EU Commission performed an investigation of TOMRA's competition law compliance. Based on this investigation, the Commission concluded in March 2006 that TOMRA in their opinion had foreclosed competition in the period 1998 to 2002 in the market for reverse vending machines in Austria, Germany, the Netherlands, Norway and Sweden by implementing an exclusionary strategy. TOMRA appealed the decision to the European General Court in 2006.

In September 2010, the Court issued their judgment where they dismissed TOMRA's appeal both on the substance and on the amount of the fine. TOMRA consequently accrued €28.2 million (NOK 226.1 million) for the fine and accumulated interest in the third quarter financial statement for 2010. TOMRA appealed this decision again but finally lost the case in April 2012.

== See also ==
- Container deposit legislation
- Infinitum AS
- List of Norwegian companies
- Reverse vending machine
