= Bottle recycling =

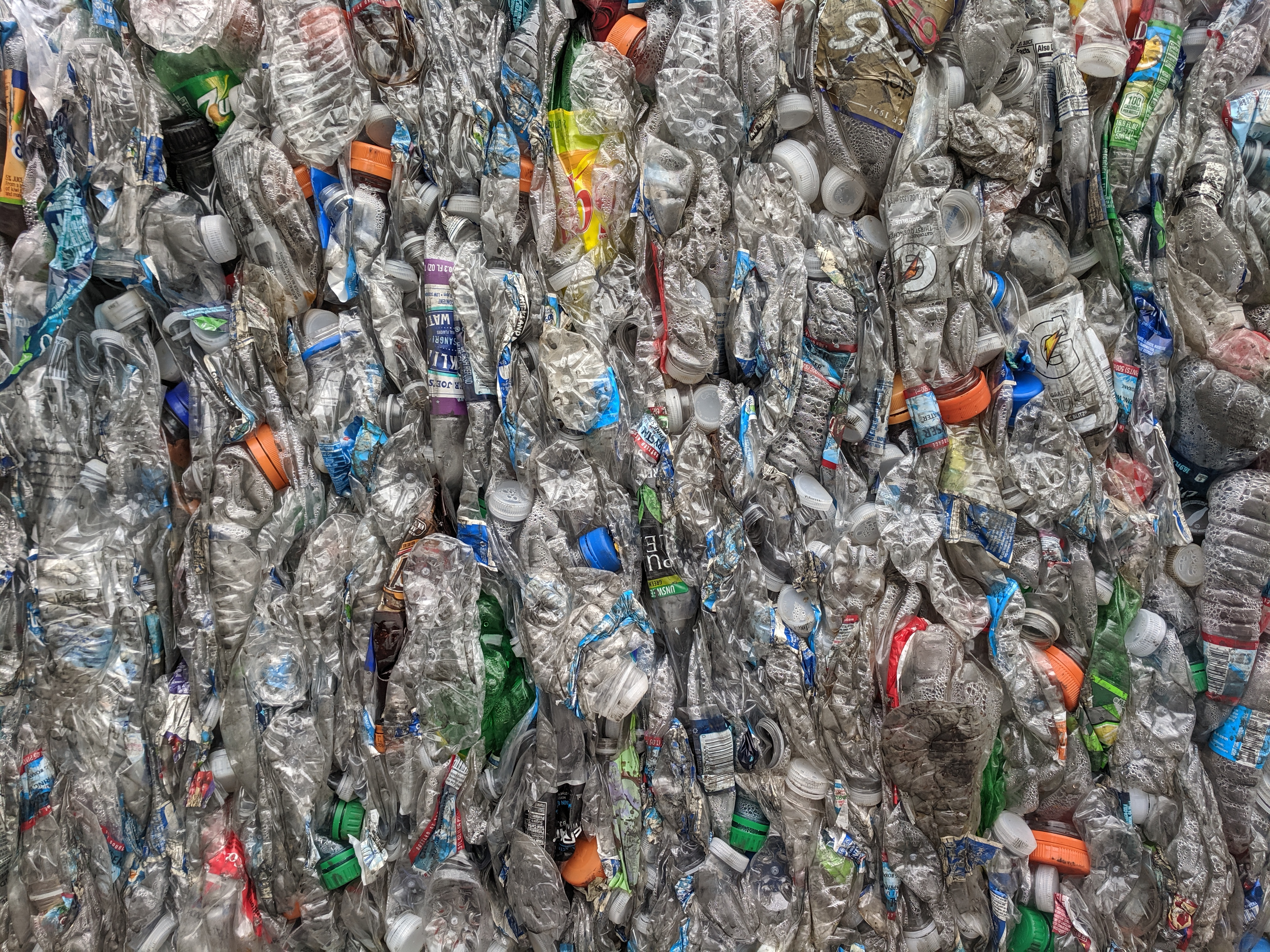
A "Bale" of plastic bottles at a recycling center.

Bottles are able to be recycled and this is generally a positive option. Bottles are collected via kerbside collection or returned using a bottle deposit system. Currently just over half of plastic bottles are recycled globally. About 1 million plastic bottles are bought around the world every minute and only about 50% are recycled.

== Glass bottles ==
A recycling bank for glass bottles.

There are a large number of benefits to recycling glass bottles, not only for the manufacturing of new bottles but also for the production of other materials that can be used in different contexts. Clean glass bottles are 100% recyclable, can be substituted for up to 95% of raw material, and can be recycled ad-infinitum without the loss of purity or quality. Recycled glass also has a variety of uses outside of the production of new bottles. The least beneficial of these uses is when glass bottles are sifted, crushed down, and mixed with food refuse to create dirty mixed cullet. Mixed cullet has few uses outside of being used as and alternative to traditional landfill daily cover. Alternatively, smaller and unrecoverable pieces of glass are ground down into a fine powder and used as a high grade sand alternative for the production of concrete.

Recoverable glass is often sorted by colour as different colour glass has a variety of uses and values. In the United States, recovered green glass is primarily shipped to Europe to produce wine bottles, brown glass is sold domestically to beer bottlers, and clear glass, the most valuable of the three can be used to replace up to 30 percent of virgin material in the production of new glass. In recent years, extended producer responsibility has come to the forefront of the debate concerning glass bottle recycling due to glass being very easy to clean and reuse, and its innate cradle to cradle design properties. Recycled glass is a necessity, as without it, manufacturers would not be able to keep up with the demand for new glass containers.

Recycling one glass bottle can save enough energy to power a computer for 25 minutes. In fact for every 10% of cullet added to the production of a new bottle, energy usage goes down by 3-4%. Recycling one ton of glass can save approximately 42 kWh of energy which translates to 7.5 pounds of air pollutants not being released into the atmosphere.

== Polyethylene terephthalate bottles ==
Polyethylene terephthalate bottles are mostly recycled as a raw material. In many countries, Polyethylene terephthalate plastics are coded with the resin identification code number "1" inside the universal recycling symbol, usually located on the bottom of the container.

== High-density polyethylene bottles ==
High-density polyethylene is commonly used in bottles, particularly bottles (or jugs) of milk. Recycling code 2 is applicable. In the US, only about 30-35% of high-density polyethylene bottles are recycled.

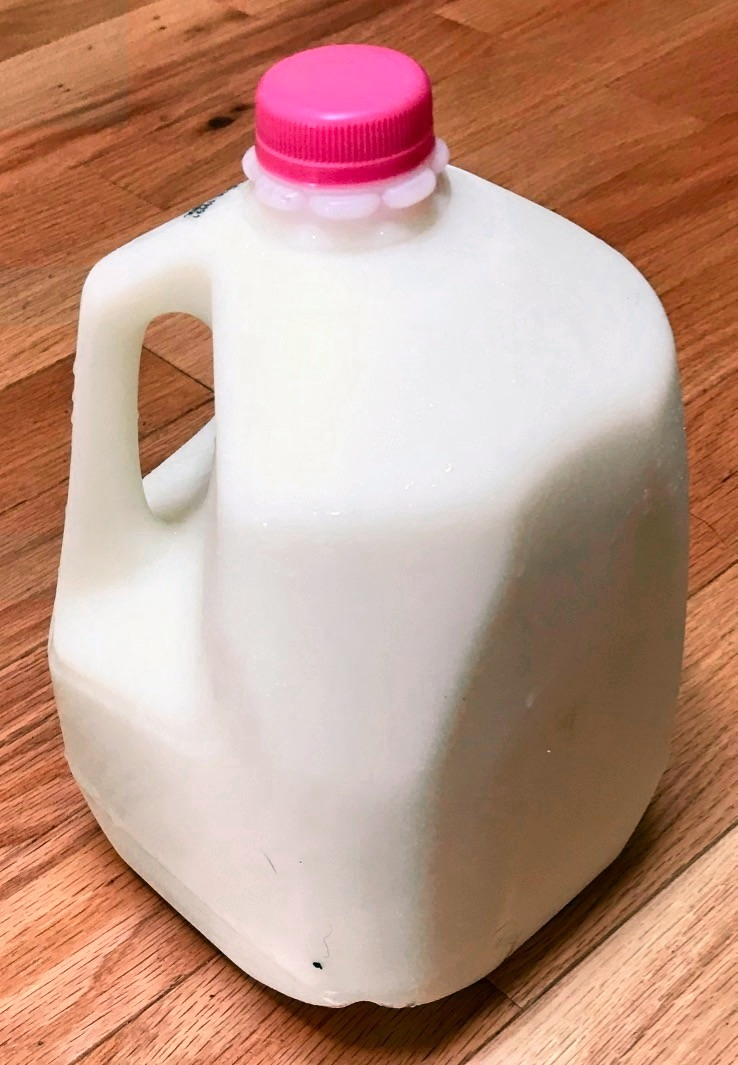
High-Density Polyethylene milk jug

== Legislation ==
Container deposit legislation are laws passed by city, state, provincial, or national governments. They require a deposit on bottles to be collected when sold and reimbursed when returned.

In May 2018 the Israeli Ministry of Environmental Protection were to impose a fine of 50m NIS on bottle manufacturers and importers that did not meet collection targets. In 2019 this was withdrawn after further review by the ministry determined the manufacturers and importers had met their collection targets.

The U.S. uses a code system, where numbers correspond to certain types of plastic bottles and types of paper. Codes for bottles/ containers are numbers 1-7 and 70–72. These numbers correspond to certain material and chemical composition as seen below.

=== Plastic Bottles and Containers ===
1: Polyethylene Terephthalate (PET)

2: High-Density Polyethylene (HDPE)

3: Polyvinyl Chloride (PVC), often made into piping.

4: Low-Density Polyethylene (LDPE)

An example of a mixed glass label.

5: Polypropylene (PP)

6: Polystyrene (PS), often made into single-use cups.

7: "Other" including, Bisphenol A (BPA), Polycarbonate, and plant-based material.

=== Glass Bottles ===
70: Mixed Glass

71: Clear Glass

71: Green Glass

== Environmental comparisons ==
Many potential factors are involved in environmental comparisons of returnable vs non-returnable systems. Researchers have often used life cycle analysis methodologies to balance the many diverse considerations. Often the comparisons show benefits and problems with all alternatives. It helps provide an objective view of a complex subject.

Reuse of bottles requires a reverse logistics system, cleaning and, sanitizing bottles, and an effective Quality Management System. A key factor with glass milk bottles is the number of cycles of uses to be expected. Breakage, contamination, or other loss reduces the benefits of returnables. A key factor with one-way recyclables is the recycling rate: In the US, only about 30-35% of high-density polyethylene bottles are recycled.

== Recycling lottery ==
The Recycling Lottery system is an incentive that provides lottery prizes for placing plastic bottles into machines. This system works having machines that take in plastic bottles and provide lottery prizes to their users. This newer system was developed primarily for use in Norway to benefit the Norwegian Red Cross.

== Alternative methods ==
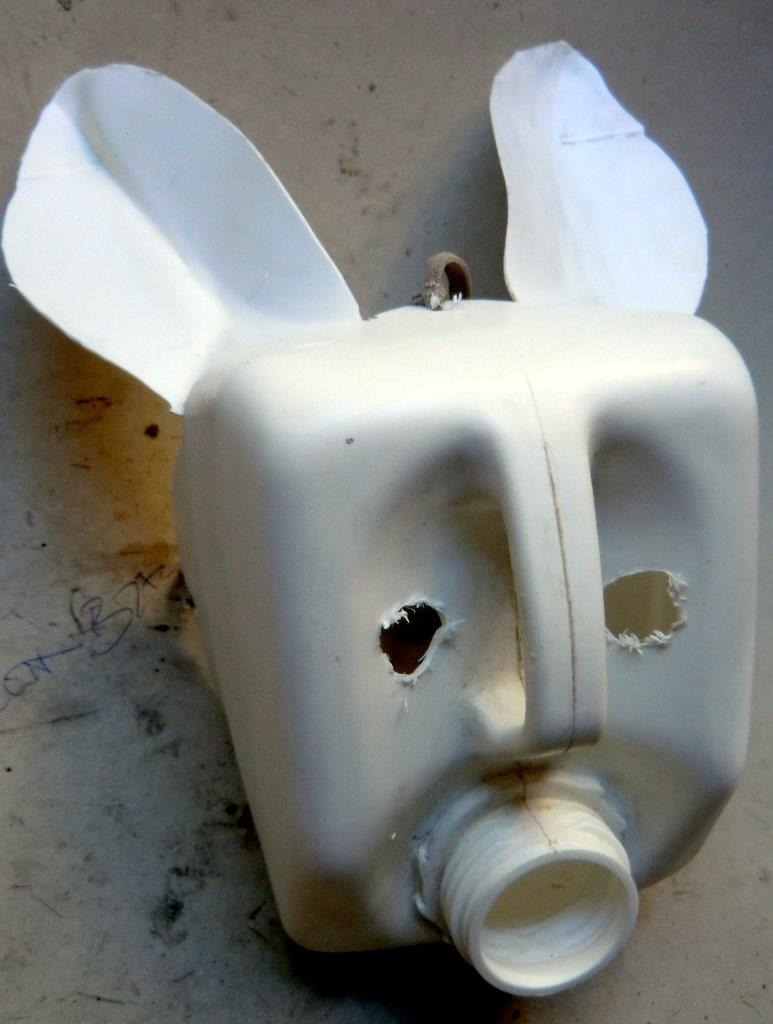
Example of bottle upcycling as art.

Upcycling is a process that involves the reuse of one item in place of another. Being a part of the recycling process, it is aimed at being a creative way of repurposing items and materials more directly. This results in less energy being used, less money being spent, and less demand for new resources to be created. The process of upcycling can be performed in many ways across many types of materials.

== Auditing Recycling Processes ==
The industry of bottle and general plastic recycling utilizes audits as a way of ensuring practices are sustainable and that integrity for worker safety and health is upheld. In some countries, like Pakistan, Cleaner Production Assessments (CPs) exist. CPs analyze the activity taking place and assign a certain risk type to the process. These processes are then divided into 3 categories based upon the Key Production Indicators, which are similar to control methods as seen with the National Institute of Occupational Safety and Health. 1 of 3 categories is then selected. Occupational Health and Safety (OSH), Environmental, and Social. Below is a table to show some of the processes and their corresponding category.

Activity	Possible Risk	Indicator Used	Category
Sorting	Health and safety issues	Use of personal protective equipment	OHS
Washing of waste plastic	Clean water depletion	Water consumption Wastewater generation	Environment
Crushing	Health and safety issues	Noise level	OHS
Washing of flakes	Clean water depletion	Water consumption Wastewater generation	Environment
Granulating	Health and safety issues	Noise level	OHS
Extrusion	Health and safety issues, Heat	Noise leve Temperature	OHS
Production	Job Creation	No. of Jobs/year	Social
Production	Wages Offered	PKR (US$)	Social
Production	Gender Representation	Percentage of male and female workers	Social
Production	Work Shift	No. of hours/day	Social

== See also ==
- Plastic recycling
- Glass container industry
- Reverse vending machine
- Glass crusher
- Oregon Bottle Bill
- History of bottle recycling in the United States
