= Beverage Container Refund Scheme =

Container refund scheme in Malta

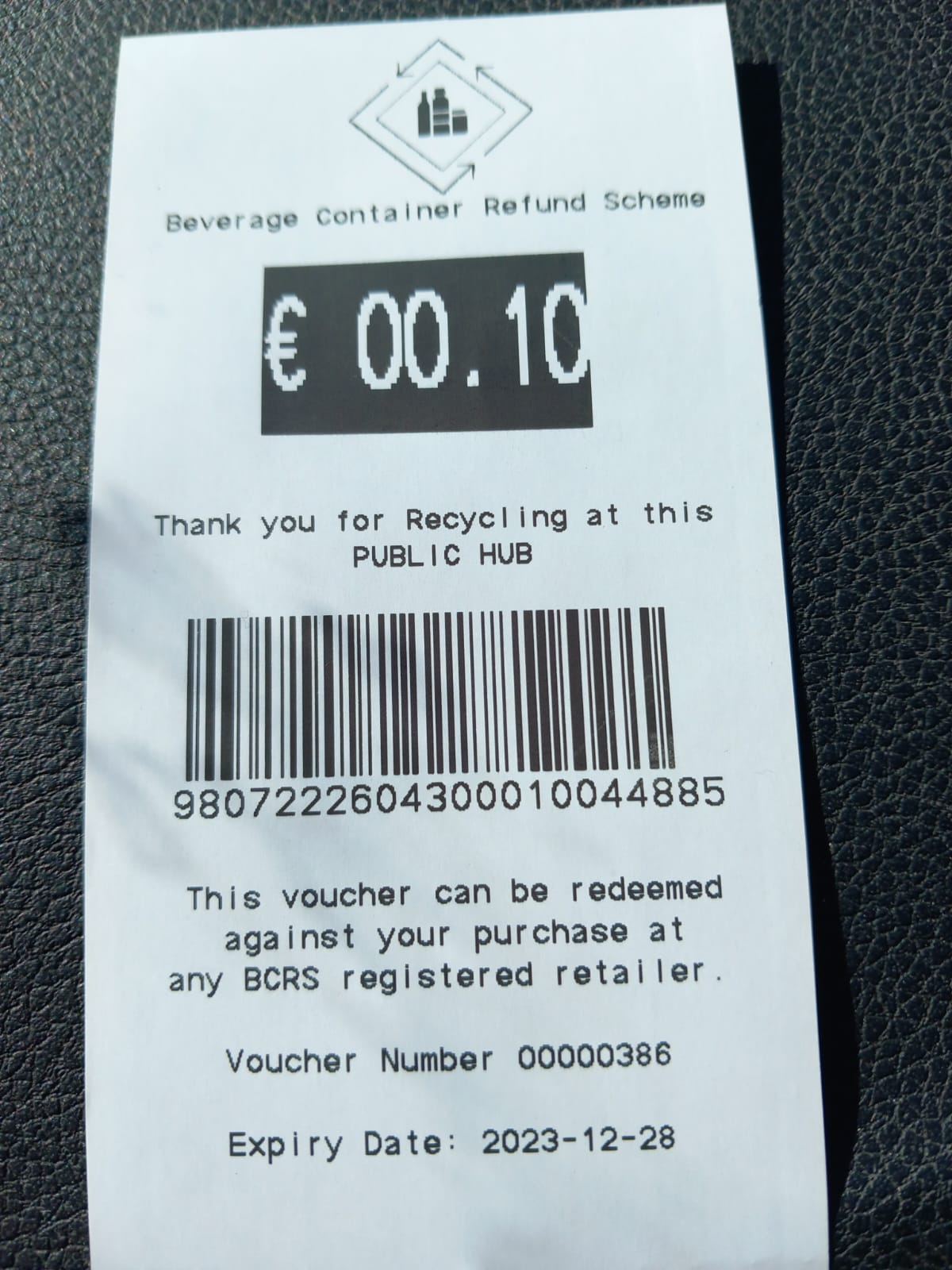
A 10c receipt

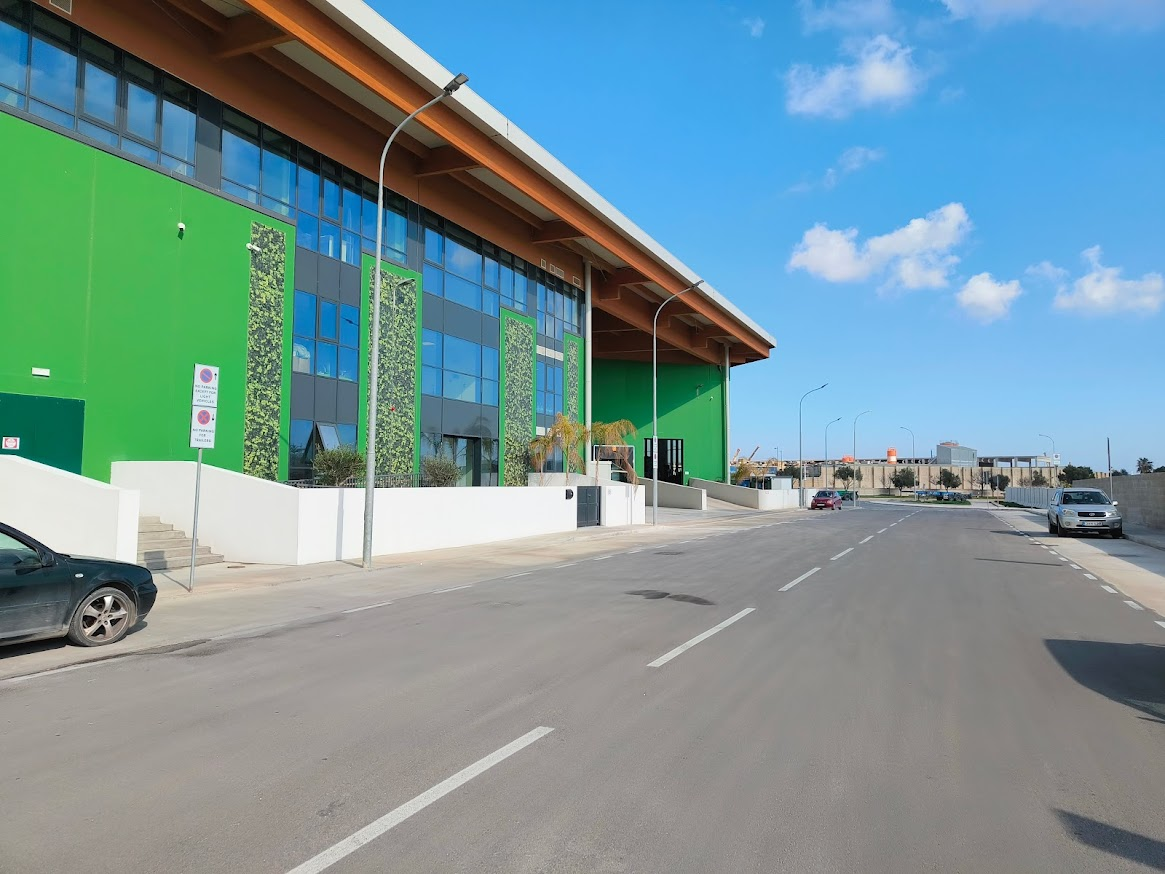
The headquarters of BCRS

The Beverage Container Refund Scheme, often shortened to BCRS is a container refund scheme currently active in Malta. The scheme first started on November 14, 2022 and is set to continue indefinitely. With the addition of the scheme, a price of 10c has been added to all applicable containers when they are purchased originally. Producers of applicable containers have also been forced to register with BCRS as per recent Maltese legislature. (Note: S.L. 549.134:)

== Usage ==
The reverse vending machines accept single-use plastic beverage containers and give a EUR 00.10 credit for each container. The credit will then be outputted in the form of a receipt which can be used either pay at a specific grocery shop.

== Reception ==
Within the first 2 hours after the scheme was opened in the late hours of the 14 November, 2,000 containers had been deposited. By the end of the first full day, 50,000 were added onto that. By 21 November, 1 million containers had been put through the scheme.

== Continued Improvements ==
As of March and April of 2023, the organization in charge of the BCRS has announced and implemented two new "Jumbo" reverse vending machines. These have been installed in Pembroke and Hal Far. This will allow the deposition of multiple plastic only containers at once.

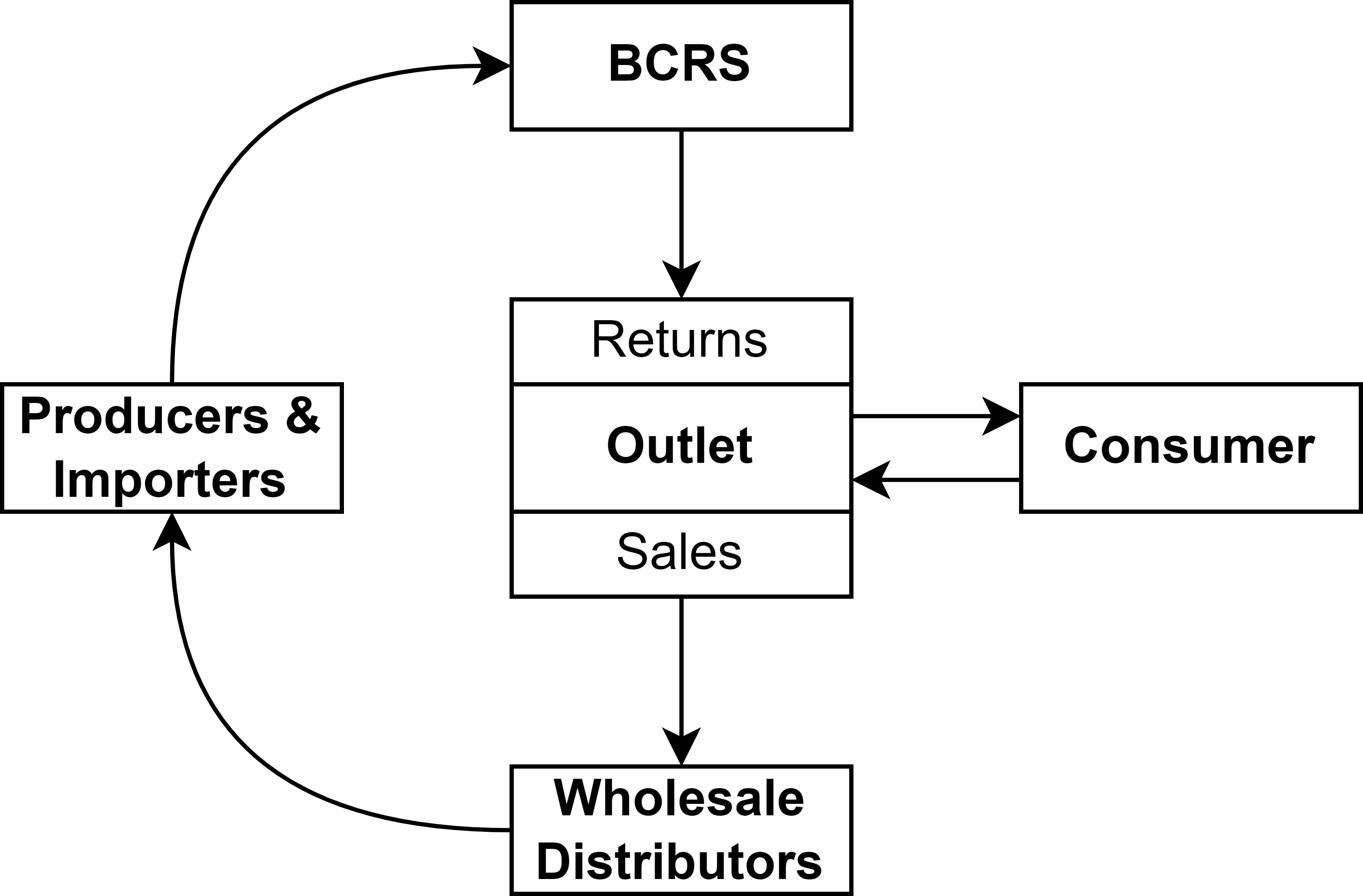
The concept of flow present in the BCRS.
