= Refill (campaign) =

British environmental campaign

Refill is a British environmental campaign that connects people to places they can eat, drink and shop with less plastic. Using a location based app, Refill provides a network of points offering the public free tap water in the UK. The network comprises high street retailers, cafes, restaurants, other businesses, museums, and local authorities. The campaign aims to prevent waste created by single-use plastic water bottles, as well as increasing the availability of quality drinking water.

== Details ==
The idea for Refill came from Natalie Fee, who set up the community interest company City to Sea in order to launch Refill in Bristol in 2015. City to Sea continues to organise it.

People can either use a dedicated smartphone app to find Refill points, or look for signs outside participating organisations.

As of March 2018, there were 5700 Refill points and it continues to be developed. All establishments of Neal's Yard Remedies, Costa Coffee, Premier Inn, Starbucks and Pret a Manger are participating.

== Towns and cities in which Refill schemes operate ==
- Bath
- Birmingham
- Brighton and Hove
- Bristol
- Cambridge
- Leamington Spa
- Llantwit Major
- London

== See also ==
- Reuse of bottles
