= Reuse of bottles =

Waste management

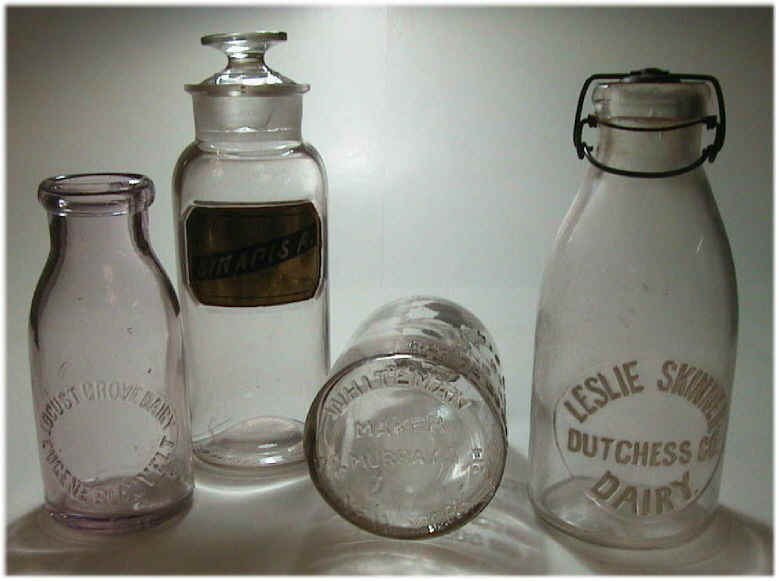
Examples of returnable glass milk bottles from the late 19th century

A reusable bottle is a bottle that can be reused, as in the case as by the original bottler or by end-use consumers. Reusable bottles have grown in popularity by consumers for both environmental and health safety reasons. Reusable bottles are one example of reusable packaging.

== History ==
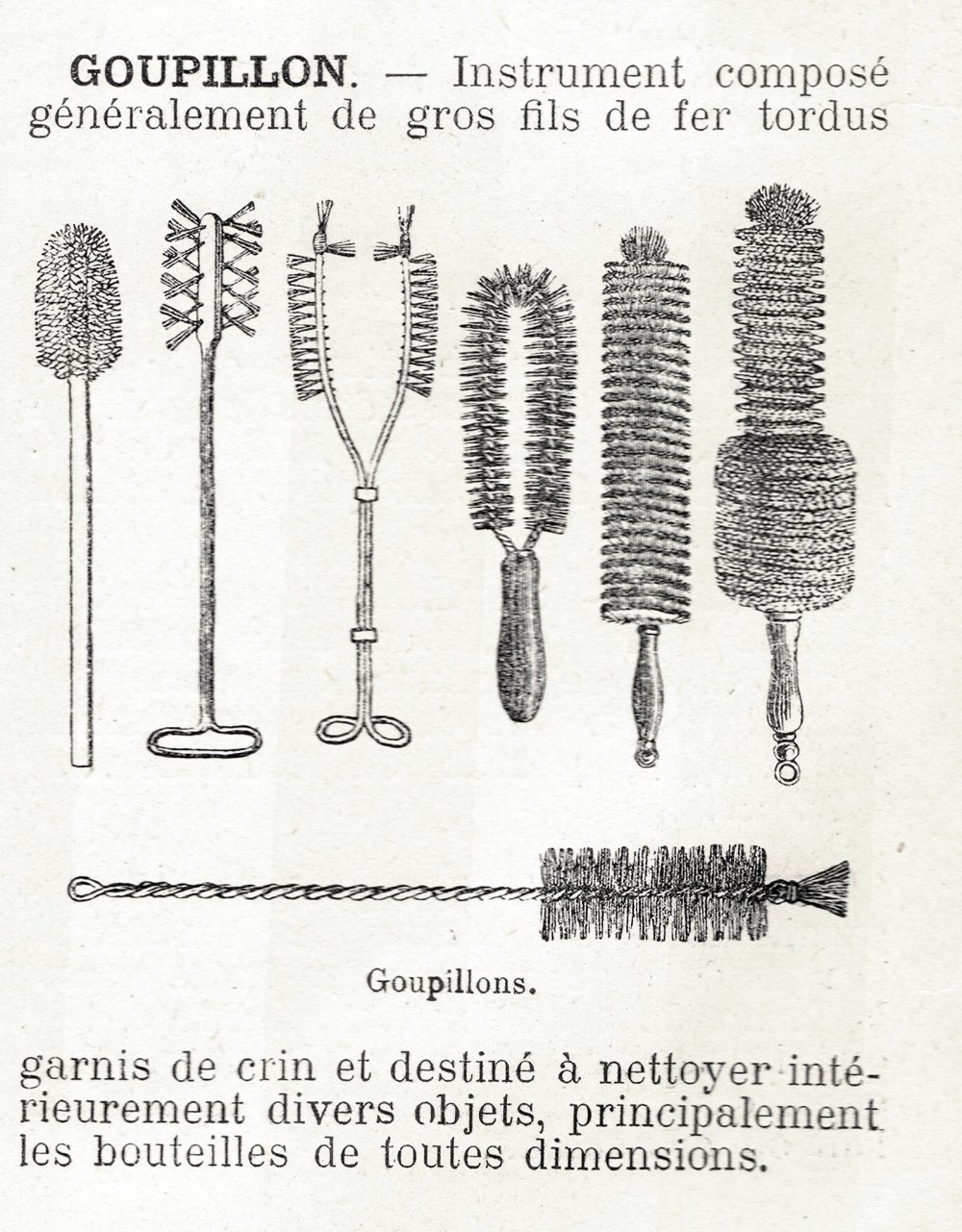
Assortment of cleaning brushes, including bottle brushes

Early glass bottles were often reused, such as for milk, water, beer, soft drinks, yogurt, and other uses. Mason jars, for example, were developed and reused for home canning purposes.

With returnable bottles, a retailer would often collect empty bottles or would accept empty bottles returned by customers. Bottles would be stored and returned to the bottler in reusable cases or crates. Glass milk bottles were transported in milk crates and would be picked up by a milkman. At the bottler, the bottles would be inspected for damage, cleaned, sanitized, and refilled.

Beginning in the second half of the 20th century, many bottles were designed for single-use, eliminating the cost of collection. This often allows for thinner glass bottles and less expensive plastic bottles and aluminum beverage cans.

Though Sweden has had a standard glass bottle recycling system since 1884, in response to the increased litter from single-use containers, container deposit laws have been adopted in many developed countries (sometimes by provincial and municipal governments) starting in the 1970s. These laws mandate that retailers must charge a deposit on certain types of containers or for certain products; retailers are then required to accept empty bottles or cans for recycling and refund the deposit. A government fund mediates any imbalances caused by buying containers at one retailer and returning them to another, and also retains the profit from unreturned containers. Reverse vending machines are often used to automate this process. The machines scan the bar code on cans and bottles to verify that a deposit was paid, shred or crush the container for compact storage, and dispense cash or a voucher that can be redeemed at the store's checkout registers.

In Germany, reusable glass or plastic (PET) bottles are available for many drinks, especially beer and carbonated water as well as soft drinks (Mehrwegflaschen). The deposit per bottle (Pfand) is €0.08–0.15, compared to €0.25 for recyclable but not reusable plastic bottles. There is no deposit for glass bottles which do not get refilled, but there are many glass bottles that do get refilled – best known is the Normbrunnenflasche, a 0.7l bottle used for carbonated drinks with a deposit of €0.15. It was introduced after a 1969 decision by the German mineral water industry, and more than five billion bottles have been produced used for an estimated quarter of a trillion refillings since then.

== Environmental consequences ==
The waste hierarchy

The reuse of containers is often thought of as being a step toward more sustainable packaging. Reuse sits high on the waste hierarchy. When a container is used multiple times, the material required per use or per filling cycle is reduced.

Many potential factors are involved in environmental comparisons of returnable vs. non-returnable systems. Researchers have often used life cycle analysis methodologies to balance the many diverse considerations. Some comparisons show no clear winner but rather show a realistic view of a complex subject.

Arguments in favor of reusing bottles, or recycling them into other products, are compelling. It is estimated that in the U.S. alone, consumers use 1,500 plastic water bottles every single second. But only about 23% of PET plastic, which is the plastic used in disposable plastic water bottles, gets recycled. Thus, about 38 billion water bottles are thrown away annually, equating to roughly $1 billion worth of plastic. The average American spends $242 per year per person on disposable, single use plastic water bottles. The environmental and cost consequences associated with disposable plastic water bottles are a strong argument for reusing bottles.

== Bottles intended for reuse by households ==
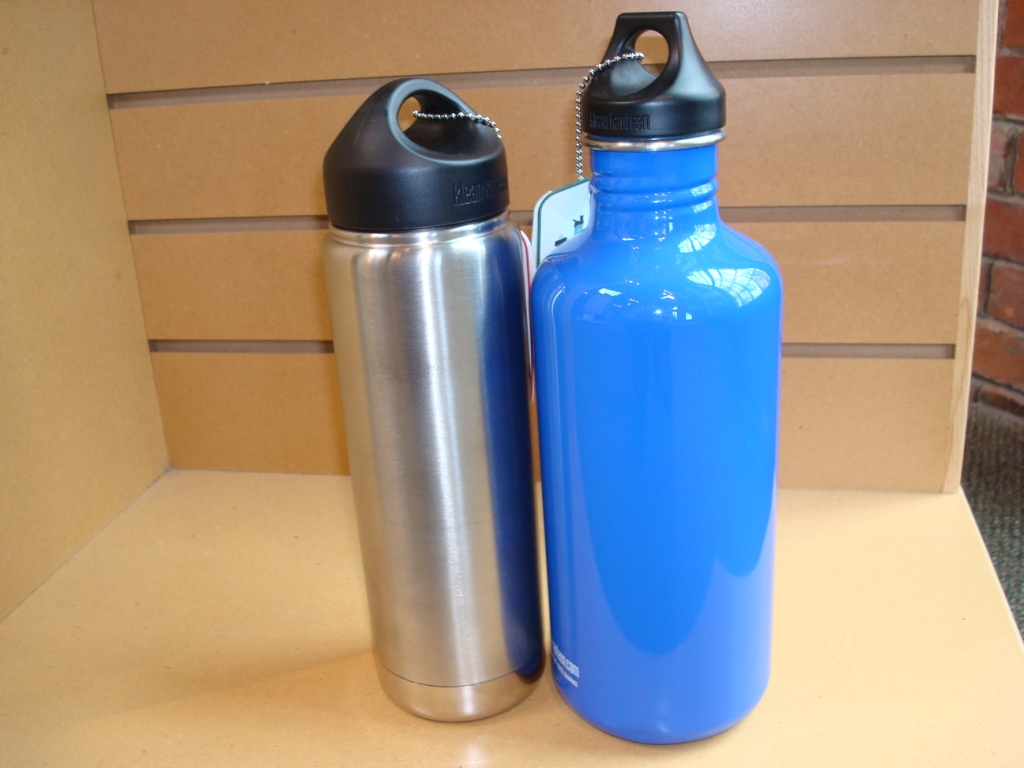
Metal water bottles

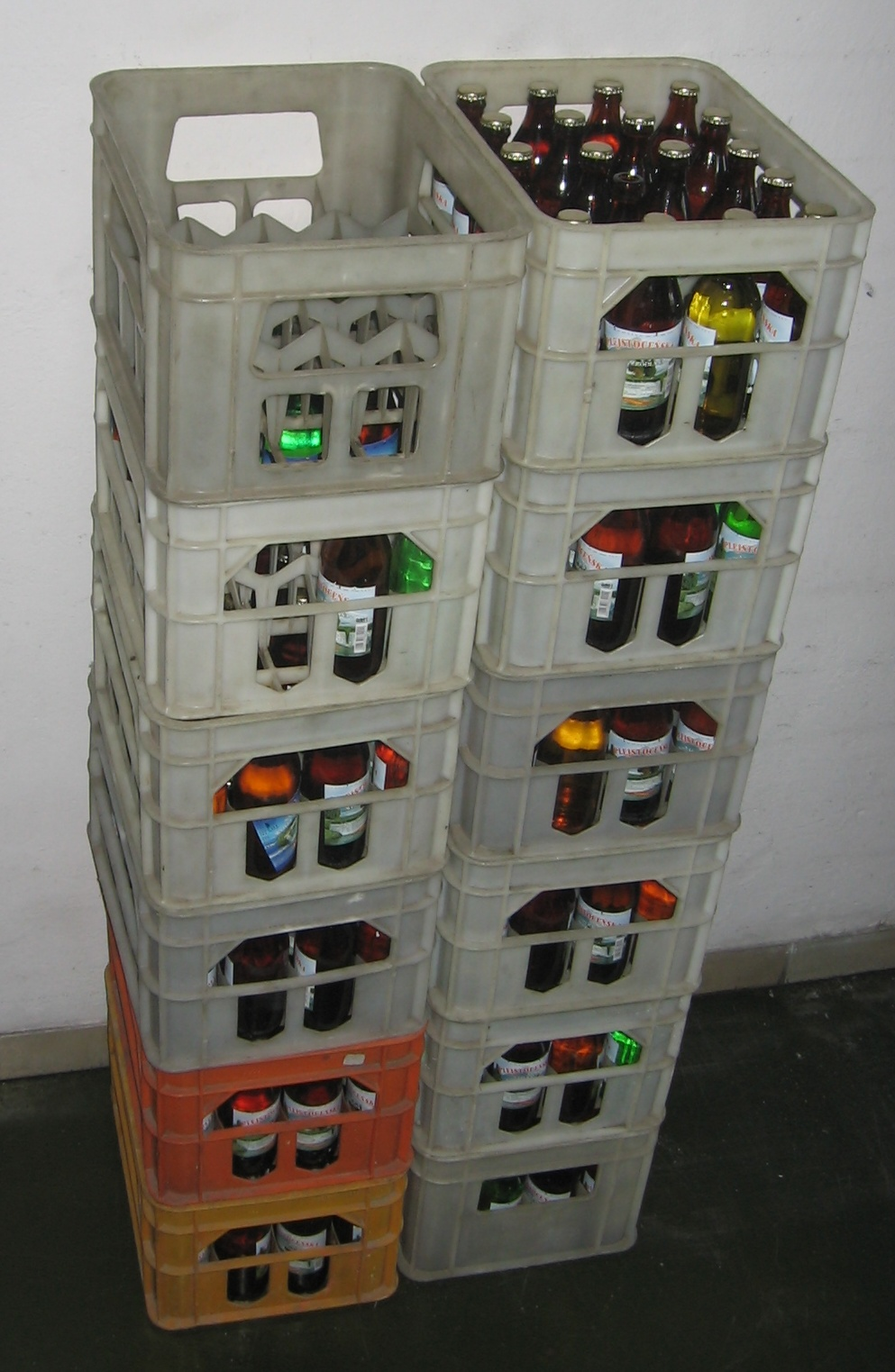
Reusable mineral water bottles in crates

Reusable drinking bottles for water, coffee, salad dressing, soup, baby formula, and other beverages have gained in popularity by consumers in recent years, due to the costs and environmental problems associated with single use plastic bottles. Common materials used to make reusable drinking bottles include glass, aluminum, stainless steel, and plastic. Reusable bottles include both single and double wall insulated bottles. Some baby bottles have an inner bag or bladder that can be replaced after each use.

== See also ==
- Bottle recycling
- Bottled water
- Liter of Light – Open source light tube design
- Reverse logistics
- Reusable packaging
- Refill (scheme)
- Solar water disinfection
