= Recycled glass countertop =

A recycled glass countertop is composed of 100% recycled glass (post consumer and pre-consumer) in a cement- or petroleum-based binder. A finished recycled glass countertop often ranges from 70 to 85 percent in recycled content.

== Environmental concerns ==
The glass used in recycled glass countertops is sourced from both post-consumer and pre-consumer sources. Post-consumer recycled glass sources are numerous, but the most common sources are curbside recycling and salvaged glass from demolished buildings.

Curbside recycled glass from homes and businesses is the largest source of post consumer recycled glass (California recycled 79% of its glass bottles in 2008), but salvage glass is an emerging new source. Many more state and municipal governments have begun to mandate the separation and recycling of the glass pulled from demolished buildings. Some companies are now processing locally sourced glass into aggregate to more closely meet the LEED, USGBC specifications.

Where the recycled glass countertops are made is another variable that is taken into account when determining the sustainability of a recycled glass countertop. At this time most of the companies manufacture their products in the United States, but recycled glass countertops have gained international interest. Now some foreign companies have begun to export recycled glass countertops to the US. This practice of importing heavy (14.5 lbs/sqr ft) recycled glass countertops from overseas when there is such a large quantity of recycled glass in the US has quickly come under scrutiny. The Leadership in Energy and Environmental Design (LEED) certification program has begun to put increasing weight on the importance of regional manufacturing to reduce the carbon footprint of building materials. This focus on materials made in the USA has the secondary effect of encouraging the support of US business in a time of economic downturn.

== Criticism ==
Heavy weight, loaded near a corner of a countertop, may cause it to crack.

Additionally, acidic foods and cleaners that are not immediately wiped off of a recycled glass countertop may permanently mar the surface.
