= Infinitum AS =

Norwegian recycling operator

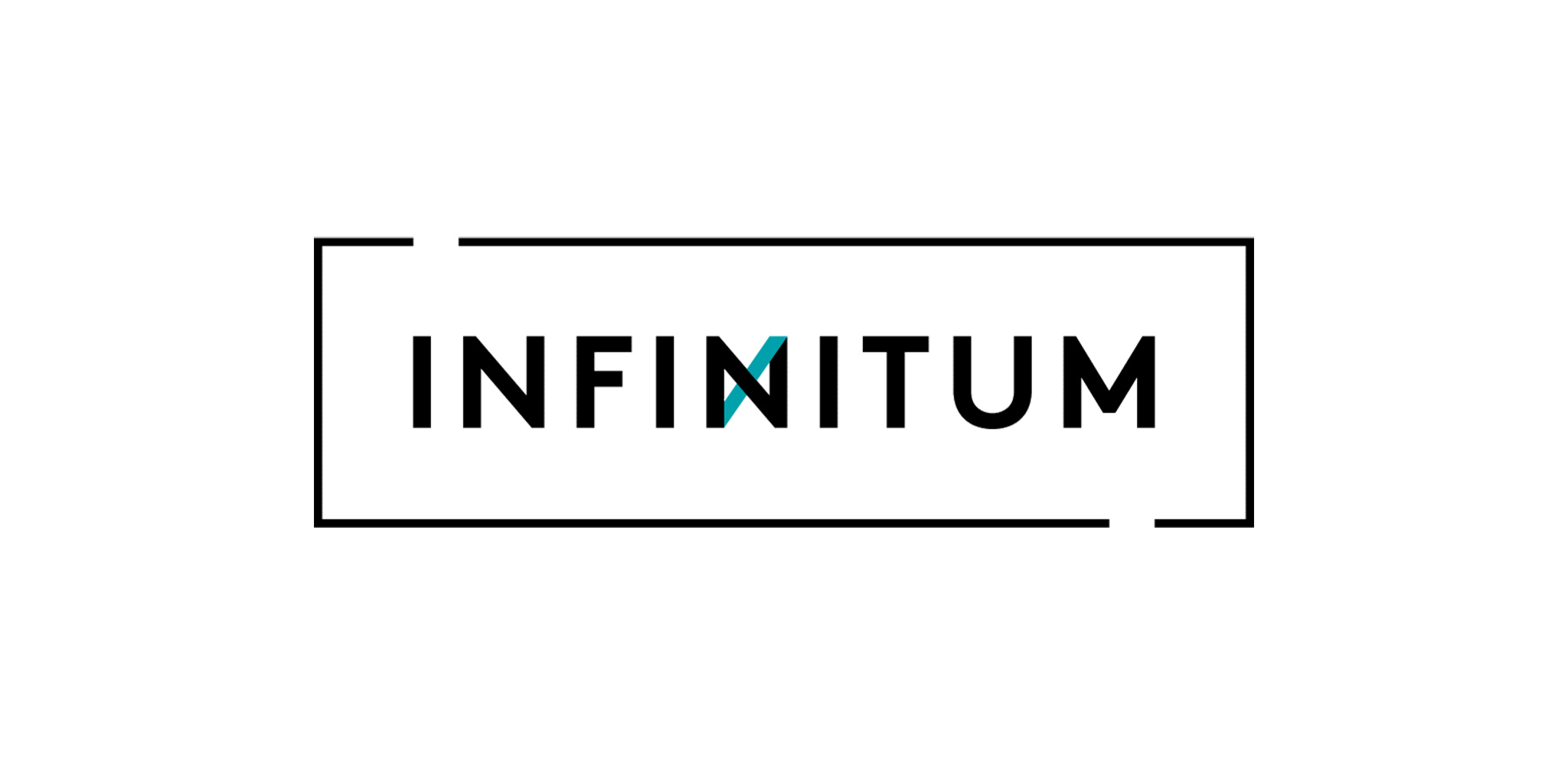
- Company type: Stock-based company
- Industry: Recycling industry
- Founded: 1996
- Headquarters: Skøyen, Oslo, Norway
- Key people: Kjell Olav A. Maldum
- Number of employees: 60
- Website: www.infinitum.no no

Infinitum AS, former Norsk Resirk AS, is a corporation that operates the national paid recycling scheme for bottles and cans marked with the official "recyclable" or "deposit" (Pant in Norwegian) logo in Norway. The beverages containers included in the program are the ones made of aluminum, steel and plastic (PET) produced in or imported to the country. It is required by law in Norway that certain one-way containers use the deposit system.

The company was established in 1996 and is owned by companies and organizations in beverage industry and food trading (giant chain stores). The company aims to ensure the highest possible return in deposit recycling packaging for beverages at the lowest cost and environmental impact, for the time being, Infinitum managed to reach 95% return rate for one-way containers in Norway.

new deposit marks on bottles and containers in Norway since 2014
