= Beverage Container Return Scheme =

Container refund scheme operated by the Singaporean government

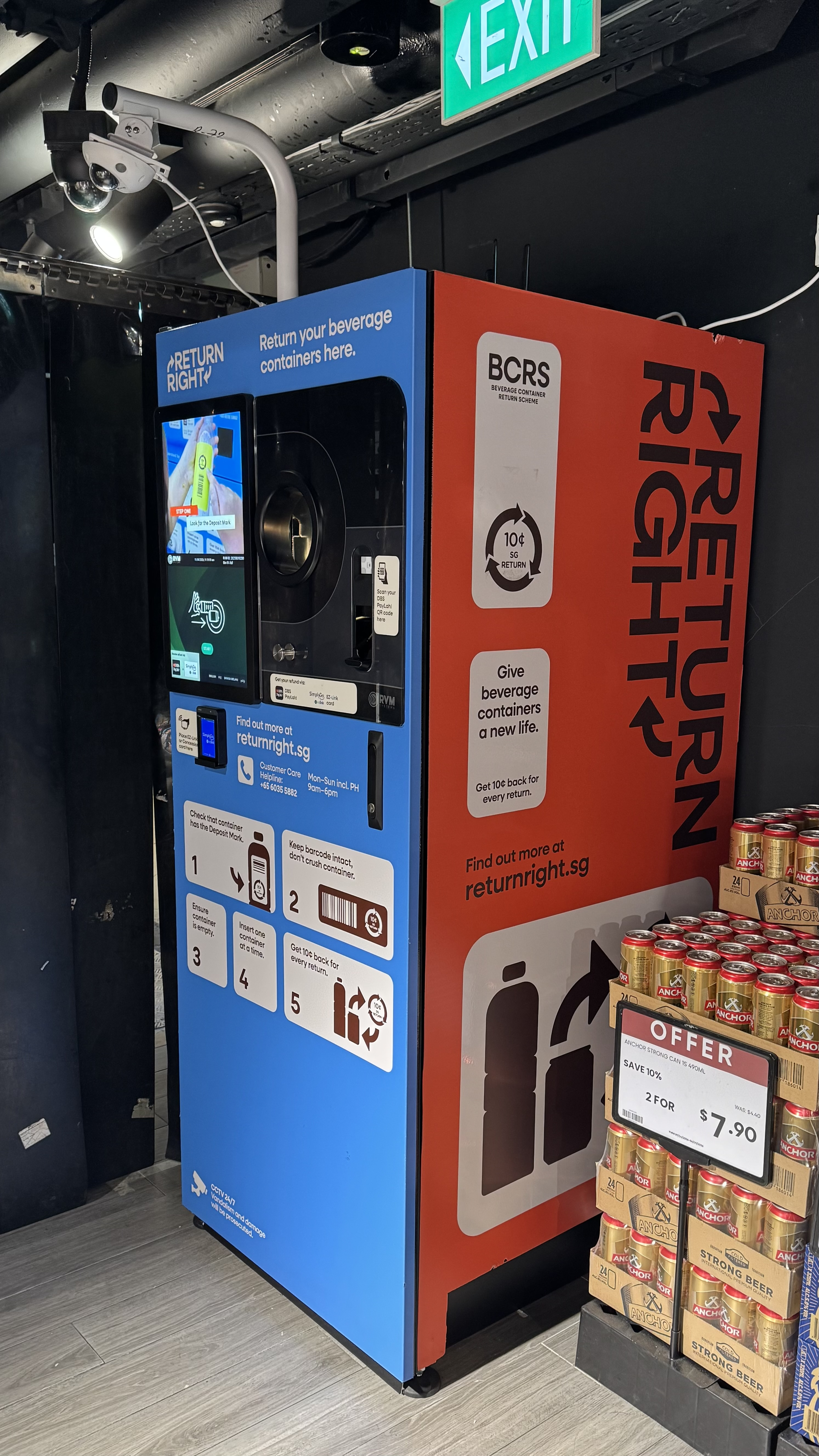
A Return Right machine where people can deposit their beverage containers.

The Beverage Container Return Scheme is a container refund scheme by the Government of Singapore. The scheme is intended to reduce waste in Singapore while improving recycling rates.

== History ==
=== 2019–2023: Pilot project and the Recycle N Save initiative ===
In January 2018, a pilot project was launched at NTUC FairPrice outlets at Waterway Point, Yew Tee Point, and Bukit Merah Central where people can recycle used cans and bottles at reverse vending machines. The project was a collaborative effort by Fraser and Neave, NTUC Fairprice, Frasers Centrepoint Malls, and Incon Green Singapore, the supplier of the machines. In return of the used cans and bottles, a person would receive vouchers. Other than the three outlets, Incon had 10 other machines deployed across Singapore. A 2018 study by Singapore Environment Council found that Singapore uses an estimate of 467 million polyethylene terephthalate (PET) bottles.

On 31 October 2019, it was announced that the pilot project would evolve into a National Environment Agency-backed initiative, Recycle N Save, where 50 reverse vending machines would be deployed in batches after the public responded favourably to the pilot project. NEA stated that the initiative was in line with the government's Zero Waste Masterplan, tackling packaging waste as one of the priority waste streams, as it has high generation and low recycling rate. In 2019, of the 930,000 tonnes of plastic waste thrown out, only 37,000 tonnes were recycled. The previous machines were replaced with ones that were of larger capacity which held up to 600 aluminium cans and plastic bottles and were fitted with compactor to flatten the returned packaging. However, feedback on the ground was that not all packaging was accepted as the machine could not recognise barcodes on some. The rewards given in the initiative were expanded to include vouchers and credits from other organisations such as Anywheel, CapitaLand malls, ActiveSG, and Sentosa.

On 30 December 2020, it was reported that about 4 million containers were returned since the onset of the initiative.

The initiative continued to expand in 2021 with waste management provider Alba W&H Smart City deploying five more vending machines in Jurong area. At the same time, NEA was reportedly pushing for an implementation of a Deposit Refund Scheme (DRS) framework in 2022, building on the popularity of the initiative in Singapore thus far, and also abroad. Minister for Sustainability and the Environment Grace Fu stated in a 2021 budget debate in the parliament that the deposit refund scheme for beverage containers would be legislated by 2022. The public efforts had caught the attention of global companies, such as Norwegian Tomra, which developed the world's first fully automated reverse vending machine in 1972, and Swedish RVM Systems, another manufacturer, to set up offices in Singapore and distribute their machines in Singapore.

=== 2023–present: Legislation and nationwide roll-out ===
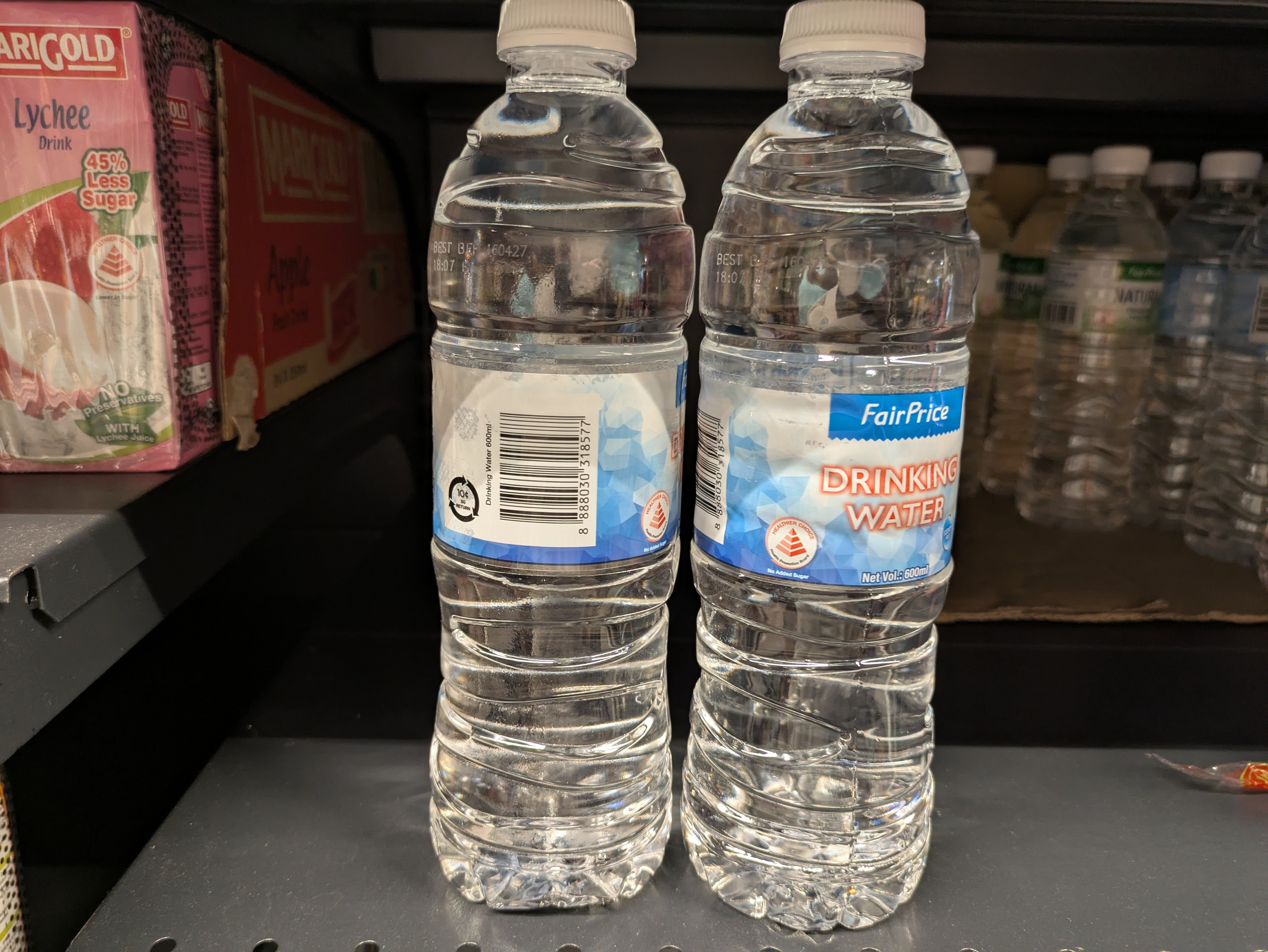
Eligible bottles have a "10₵ SG return" Deposit Mark next to the product barcode.

Eligible bottles with a sticker printed with a new barcode and "10₵ SG return" Deposit Mark

The Beverage Container Return Scheme was first announced in 2020, with a public consultation phase in September 2022. It is part of the Resource Sustainability (Amendment) Bill that was passed in Parliament on 22 March 2023. Initially scheduled to launch in April 2025, the scheme was delayed by a year to April 2026 to allow more time for beverage producers and retailers to implement the scheme. A not for profit company, the Beverage Container Return Scheme Limited (BCRS Ltd) was also established to design and operate the scheme.

On 18 March 2026, BCRS Ltd announced the launch of a website to locate the reverse vending machines, branded as Return Right, as well as their capacity status.

The scheme is officially launched on 1 April 2026. It has a target goal of having 80% of the drinks containers sold in its third operating year to be recycled. The drink producers and importers are charged registration fees and a producer fee of between 3.1 to 3.7 cents for each drink container sold, which had led to early speculations that the cost of drinks sold could increase by 25 to 60 cents. BCRS Ltd had deployed 1,070 Return Right machines across the island for the initial launch. The scheme requires consumer to pay a deposit of 10 cents for each PET bottle or aluminium can bought at retail. Food and beverages outlets can apply to participate in the Return Right F&B Scheme which allows them not to collect the deposits from their customers, but instead collect the containers for recycling after their customers are done with their meals.

The deposit is passed along back to BCRS Ltd as an intermediary through the supply chain, with the producers of the drinks depositing the amount into BCRS Ltd when the drinks are manufactured in or imported into Singapore. When the drinks are distributed to the market, the retailers and businesses will pay the deposit amount to the producers. Consumers make the deposit payments to the retailers when they make their purchases. The consumer would then return the bottle or can at the Return Right machines to reclaim the deposit from BCRS Ltd. Eligible bottles and cans are labelled with a 10-cent Deposit Mark. Unrefunded deposits will be used to defray the operating costs of BCRS Ltd.

The availability of eligible bottles and cans was limited at the start of the scheme as retailers were still replenishing their shelves with stock purchased before the mark was printed on the products. Additionally, authorities allowed an transition period between April and September 2026 for retailers to sell the ineligible products. The transition period had led to confusion by some citizens who tried to recycle the older ineligible bottles or cans to claim refunds. On 5 August, Senior Minister of State for Sustainability and the Environment Janil Puthucheary told the Parliament that since the launch of the programme, 5.5 million bottles and cans had been collected with 1 million successful transactions at the Return Right machines being made. There had been reports of people unable to collect their deposited amount when returning their containers for various reasons, including non-detection or mis-identification of the barcodes on the containers, with one reported that it took two weeks for BCRS Ltd to process the refund manually.
