= Reverse vending machine =

Machine for recycling bottles and cans

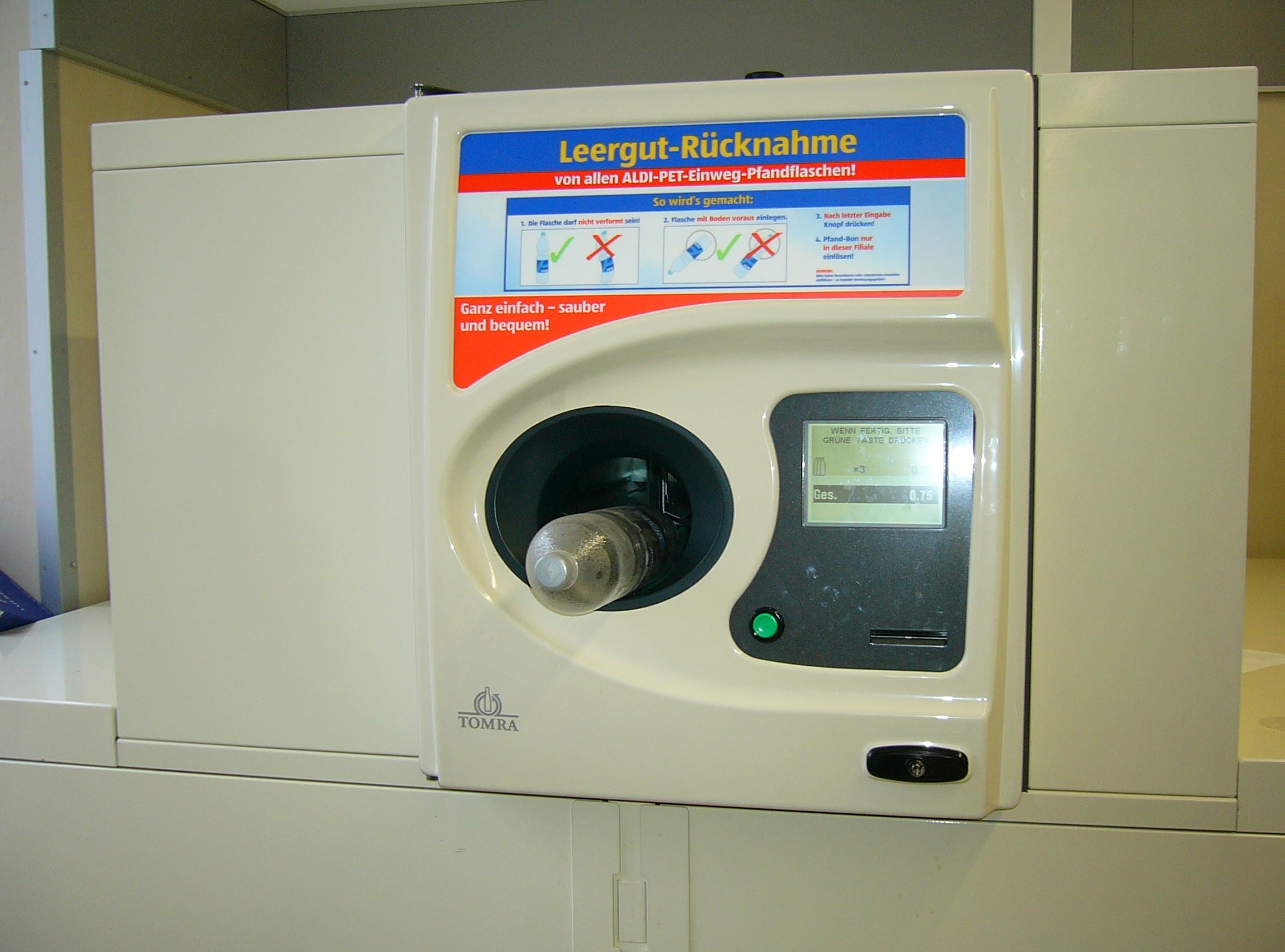
Reverse vending machine in an Aldi supermarket in Munich, Germany

A reverse vending machine (RVM) is a machine that allows a person to insert a used or empty glass bottle, plastic bottle, or aluminum can in exchange for a reward. After inserting the recyclable item, it is then compacted, sorted, and analyzed according to the weight, materials, and brand using the universal product code on the bottle or can. Once the item has been scanned and approved, it is then crushed and sorted into the proper storage space for the classified material. Upon processing the item, the machine rewards people with incentives, such as cash or coupons.

The first prototype of a reverse vending machine was established in 1972 by TOMRA. With nations increasingly adopting policies concerning recycling and sustainability, reverse vending machines have become the standard in areas with stringent recycling policies. To date, there are more than one hundred thousand RVMs spread globally, located in countries including the United Kingdom, Russia, Norway, Finland, Sweden, Australia, Canada, and the United States.

== History ==
On 13 September 1920, the first patent for an 'Empty Container Return and Handling Machine' was registered in America using a coin return as compensation by Elmer Jones and Sue Walker. This machine was referred to as a "Bottle Return Machine" (BRM) during that time. The first working BRM took approximately thirty years from the first patent to be invented and manufactured. This whole process was conducted by "Wicanders from Sweden," with the machine being used throughout the 1950s. In 1962, an evolved "Automatic Bottle Return Machine" was established by Aage Tveitan. After the invention, the machine was manufactured en-masse by the innovator's firm Arthur Tveitan ASA in Norway and distributed worldwide.

In 1994, a three-in-one machine focused on bottle recycling was conceived by Kansmacker and is still being used today in some states within the U.S. In the United Kingdom, the Reverse Vending Corporation established the first independent return ready Reverse Vending Machines. In 2018, RVM Systems paid for the assets and trademarks of the United Kingdom's top reverse vending company, Reverse Vending Corporation. Now these machines are standard across the United Kingdom.

== Operation ==
Video of a reverse vending machine in operation in Norway

The operations of the reverse vending machine (RVM) are relatively straightforward in that when the recycler brings the used beverage bottle to the machine, a "receiving opening" is designed precisely to accept the bottles. The opening ensures that the device can take only one container at a time. However, on older systems of the RVM, the recycler has to open a small door on the machine placing the container in a pan before the door closes, with the process being repeated all over again. After that, the recycled bottle automatically turns and is then scanned by a UPC ("Universal Product Code") scanner. The scanner's primary purpose is to scan the UPC located within the recycled container. The UPC system is different from the previous methods RVMs used which analyzed the shape and form of the item while using other identification constraints to ensure the container is matched against the system's database substituting the barcode.

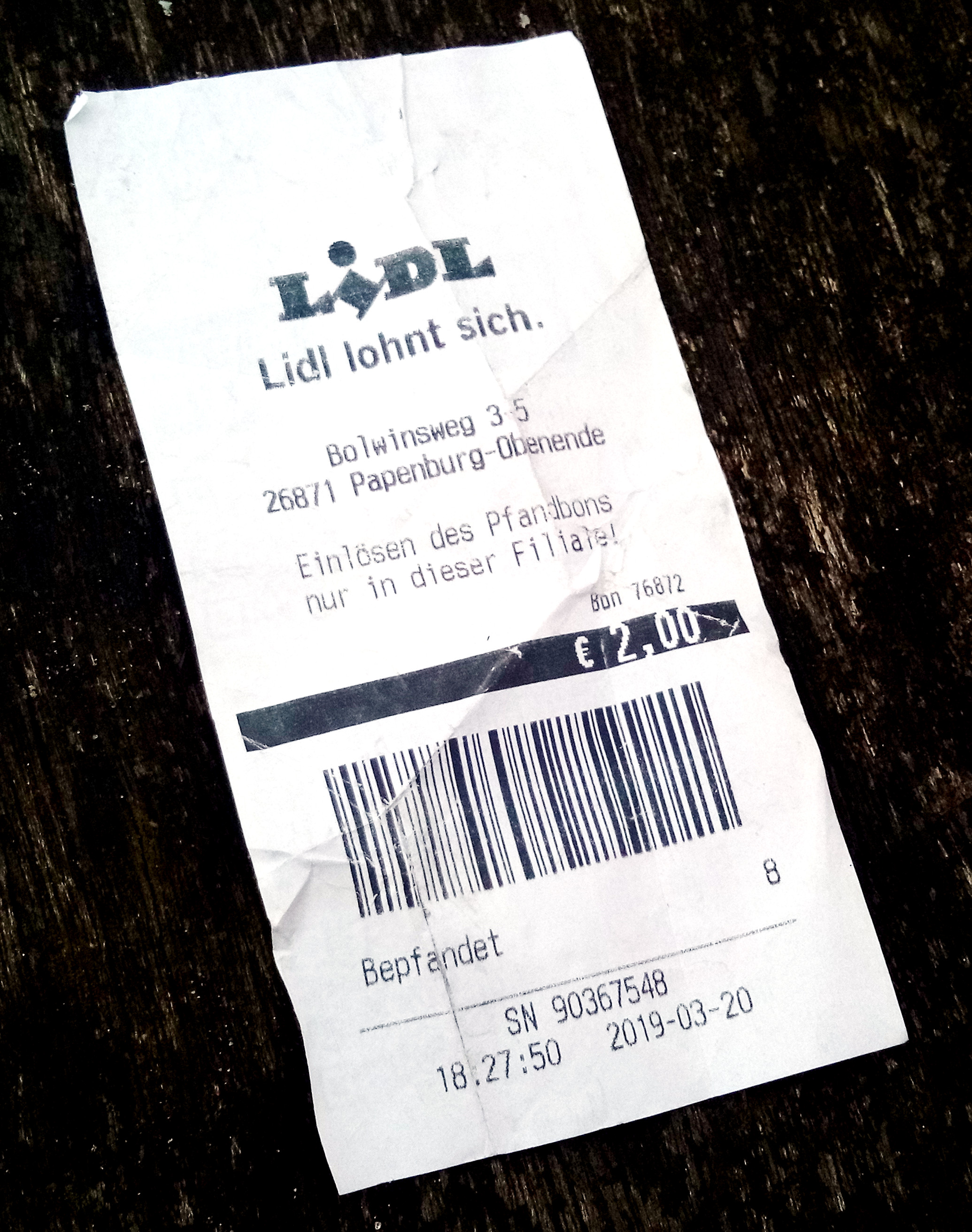
Reverse vending machine receipt

Up-to-date machines utilize artificial intelligence as the contemporary "recognition layer" rather than other identification segments. Aco Recycling is the first company to develop AI Recognition Module for Reverse Vending Machines, machines has been already deployed to deposit and non deposit countries. After the recycled item is scanned and matched to the system's database, it is then considered an approved item. Recyclable items are quickly processed and crushed to ensure size reduction, to prevent leaks of any liquids inside the bottles, and finally, to boost the machine's storage volume. In addition, refillable containers are manually handled and returned to the bottling firms. According to a study by the New York City Housing Authority, participants reported that the reverse vending machine was a more flexible option for recycling and convenience purposes. Furthermore, these machines are seen as a contributor to the circular economy as people are motivated to participate in recycling initiatives due to monetary benefits.

== Mechanics ==
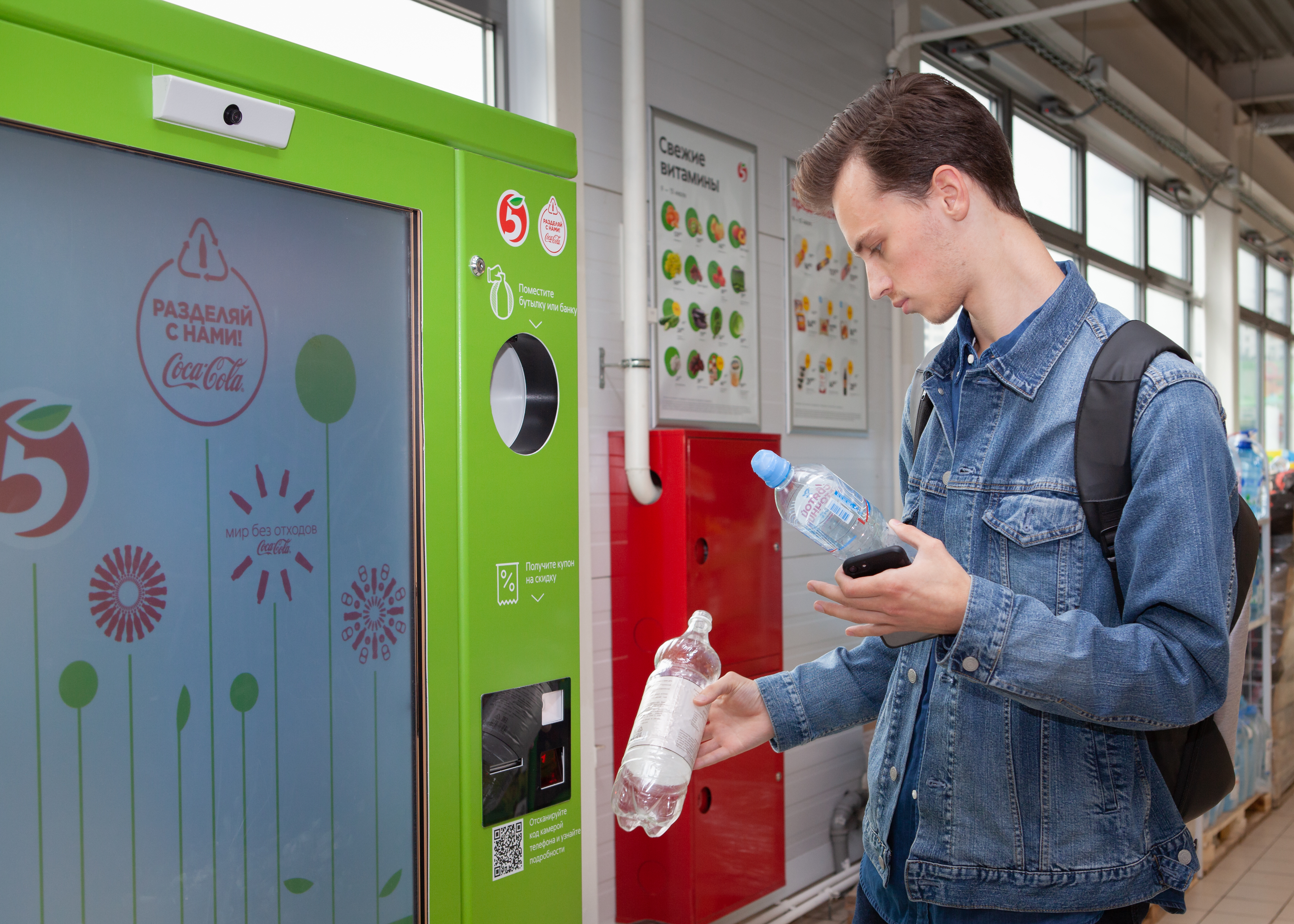
User scanning plastic bottles in a reverse vending machine in Moscow (2020)

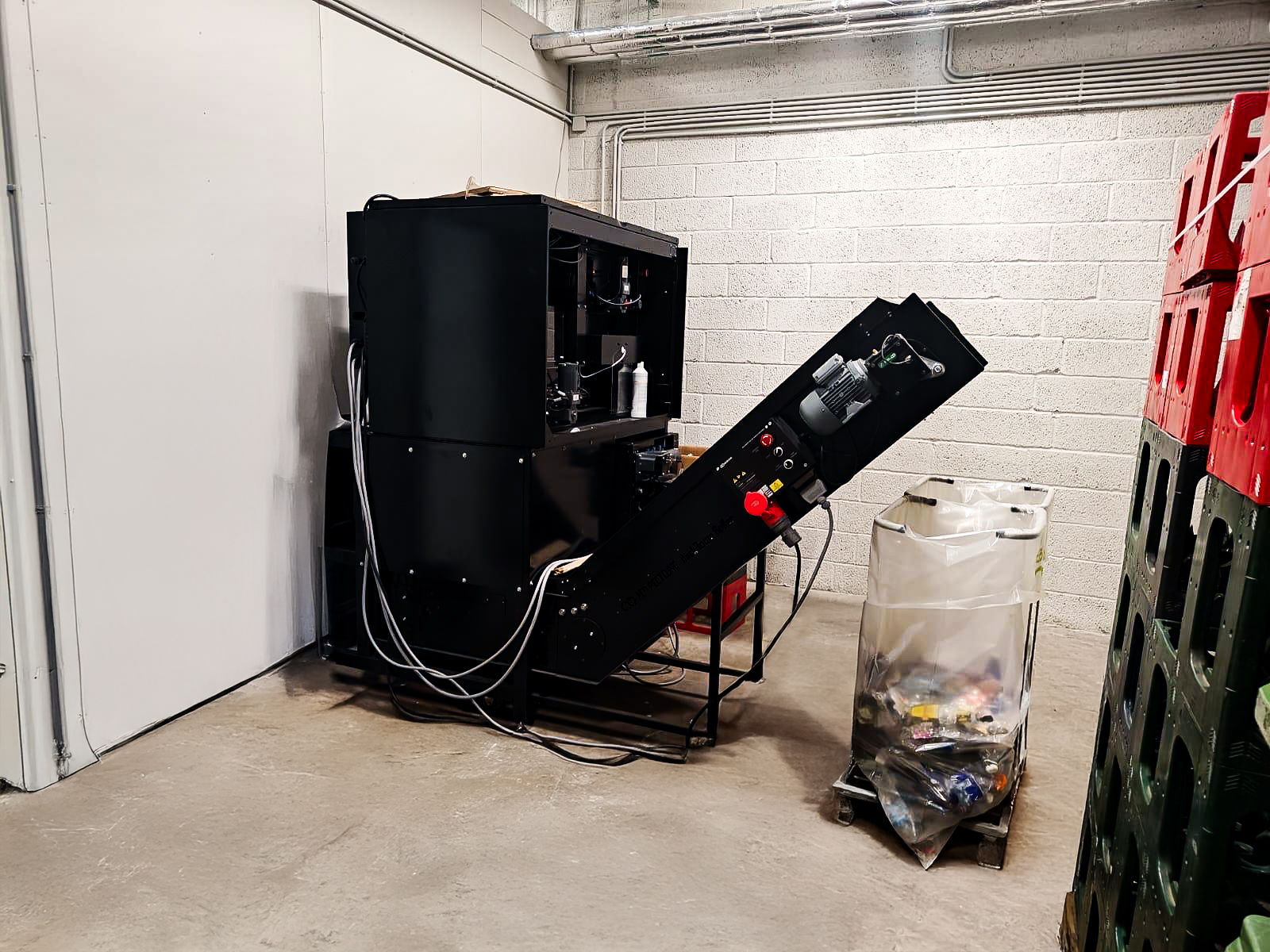
A back-room handling unit sorting items into different bins, in Estonia

A back-room handling system can allow the use of different bin types.

The reverse vending machine attempts to solve the efficiency problem of sorting waste to enhance the recycling process. Reverse vending machines work by permitting the user to insert the recycled containers within a specific aperture inside the machine, after which the container is compressed to reduce its size and allow more to be stored within the machine. After the machine compresses the items, it sorts them for storage purposes, after which they will be delivered to companies responsible for recycling them.

When the machine receives a container from the user, the item is placed in the "loading pad", which may be a pan or a wheel. In the pan form, containers are sorted using a barcode scanner, with software matching the container against a database, and a hardware sensor works with other parts to ensure the machine works effectively. The machine interacts with recyclers, information technology support and technical maintenance teams.

New technological developments are increasingly being implemented in Europe. In October 2021, Germany and Denmark partnered with TOMRA to launch the multi-feeding reverse vending machine, the TOMRA R1, enabling recyclers to deposit more than one hundred used beverage containers into such machines in one go.

TOMRA, which is the biggest manufacturer of reverse vending machines, is expanding its reach as a global RVM leader in Europe, and has committed to donating five eurocents to raise money for vital medical equipment in Apeldoorn, Netherlands, with TOMRA's first publicly available R1 unit. TOMRA's R1 machine exhibits higher recycling deposit return rates, achieving 98% returns in Germany, and 92% in Denmark.

== Demand ==
Waste is being accumulated at a growing pace all over the world, causing the need for new recycling solutions like reverse vending machines. In 2016 alone, over 400 billion bottles were dispersed globally to consumers, with a little less than half of those bottles being amassed for recycling.

In the countries that have adopted reverse vending machines, their public and private sectors have partnered to partake in the recycling effort to forego paying extra taxes and contributing to the supply of reverse vending machines, and direct investment to get retailers and waste processors involved in the space despite the initial costs of purchasing and deployment.

With product-focused collection and recycling programs outperforming traditional recycling methods, governments are looking into automating the process by adopting government funding grant programs to help supply more machines throughout urban areas. As an example, California and Michigan have adopted "bottle bills". Yet beverage companies have put up resistance to these measures.

== Locations ==
=== Asia ===
Kazakhstan has embraced the idea of using reverse vending machines to help in their waste management processes.

India first introduced the RVMs to help recycle containers in 2016.

In Singapore, RVMs were installed nationwide by the joint collaboration between National Environment Agency (NEA) and F&N Foods in 2019 with rewards given out for returning bottles. These machines were received with overwhelming public response. As of August 2023, 16 million bottles had been collected. The RVMs stopped giving out rewards due to the upcoming Beverage Container Return Scheme which shall commence in 2026.

=== Europe ===
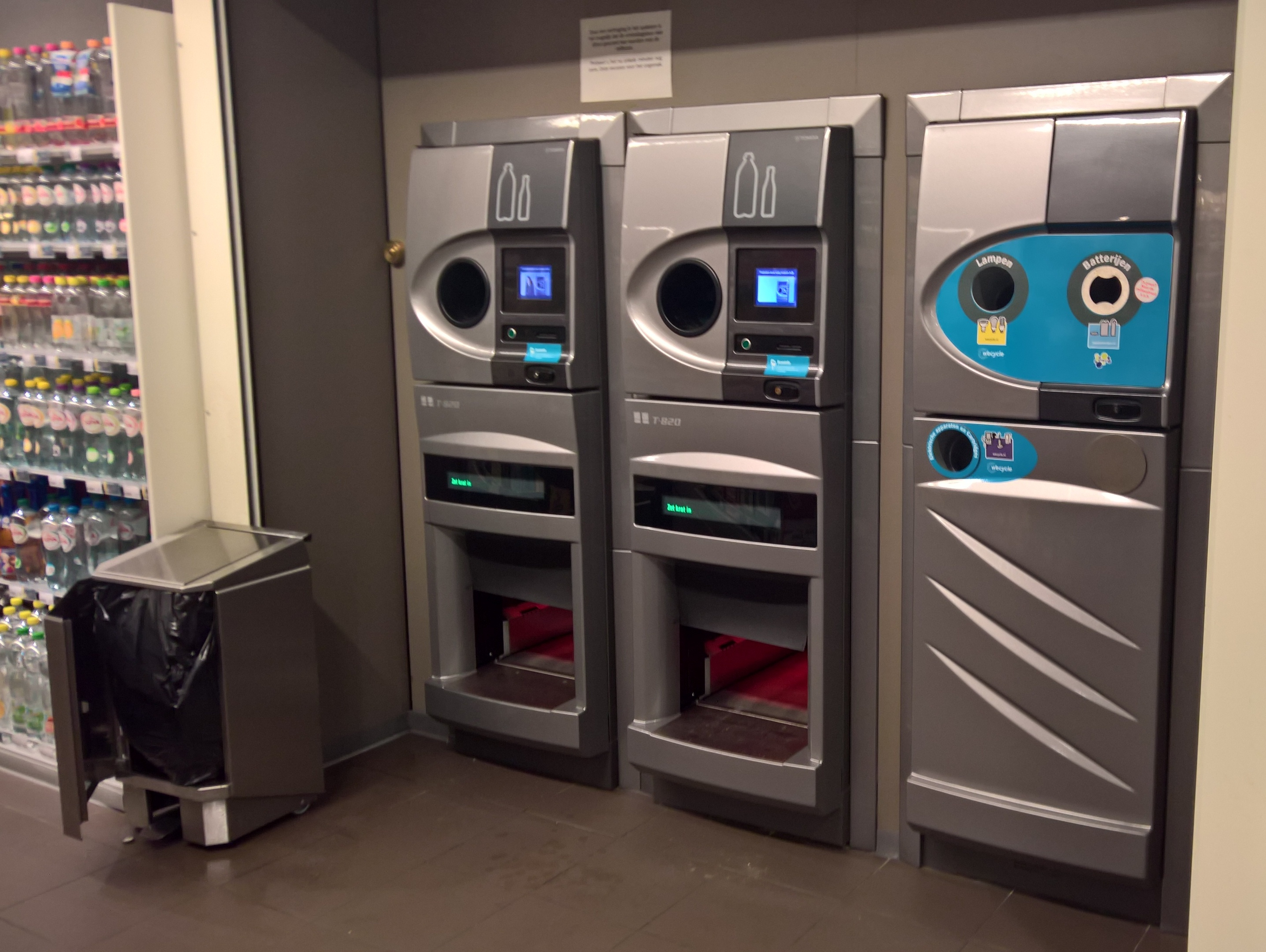
Bottle reverse vending machines in an Albert Heijn supermarket, Netherlands

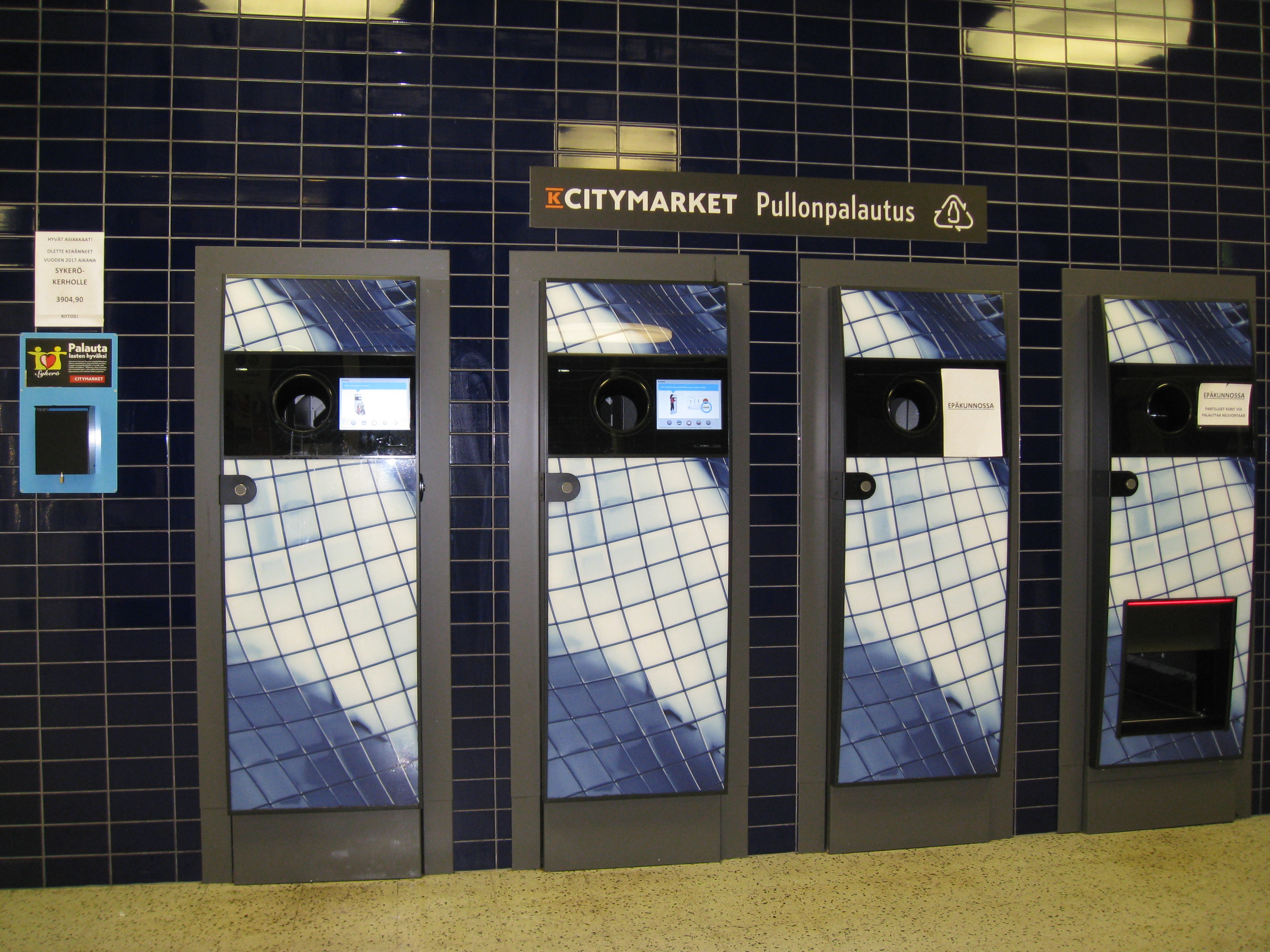
Reverse vending machine for empty beverage cans and bottles in an K-Citymarket in Finland

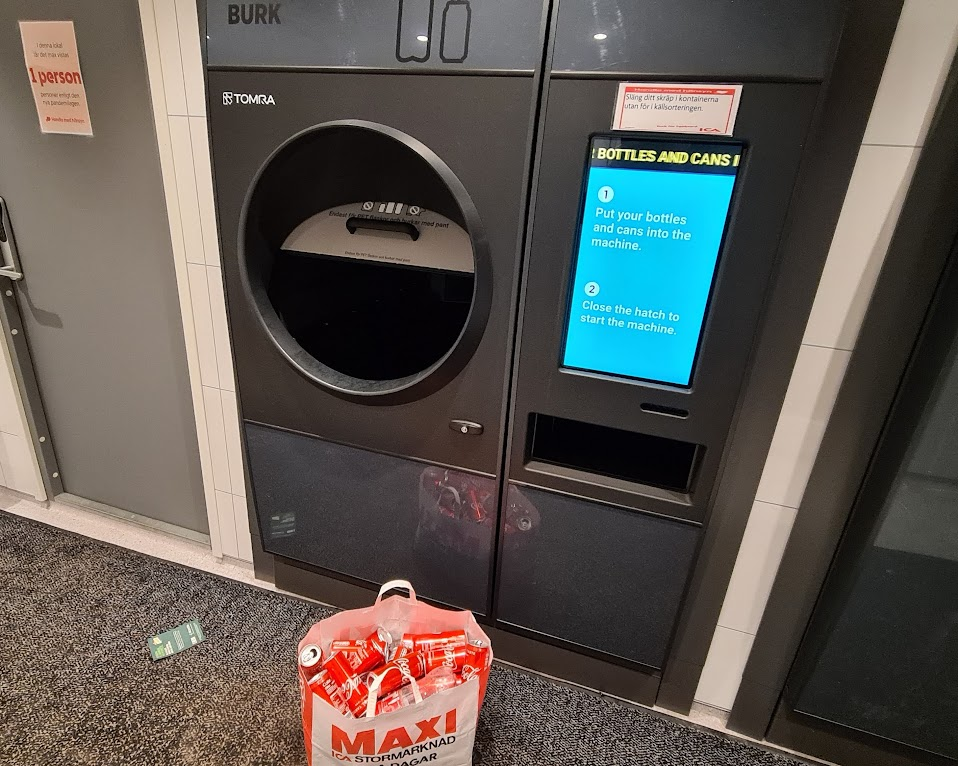
A machine in Sweden with a "pour-all-in" function, capable of handling bulk amounts of PET bottles and cans in a single go

Norway is among the leading countries in recycling in Europe. In Norway alone, there exists over 3700 reverse vending machines, and more than 10,000 stations, where trash, including bottles, could be received. Norway offers relatively high monetary incentives for the returned bottles, thus resulting in high recycling rates. Finland is another country with high recycling rates based on the tax for liters generated. Bottle reverse vending machines are widespread in Nordic and Baltic countries, Germany, the Netherlands, and Poland.

In February 2022, an Aldi store in Ireland set up a RVM in Mitchelstown, County Cork.

More than 140 grocery stores owned by UK-based retailer Tesco are planning to add RVMs. Moreover, Tesco has committed to making all of its branded products 100% recyclable by 2025, and spearheaded an RVM campaign set to debut in early 2022.

=== Middle East ===
In 2018, Israel was able to collect 77% of the recyclable waste by returning the deposit fee to the end user.

=== North America ===
In North America, the adoption of recycling is relatively low; only 9.2% of the plastics manufactured in the United States were recycled. Product-focused recycling and collection programs are being implemented in states like Michigan and California, where reverse vending machines are starting to be implemented. Reverse vending machines have been implemented in various entertainment venues in the region as well, including Lincoln Financial Field, Javits Center, Nationals Park, and Red Rocks Amphitheater. They were also deployed at a Super Bowl.

=== Oceania ===
==== Australia ====
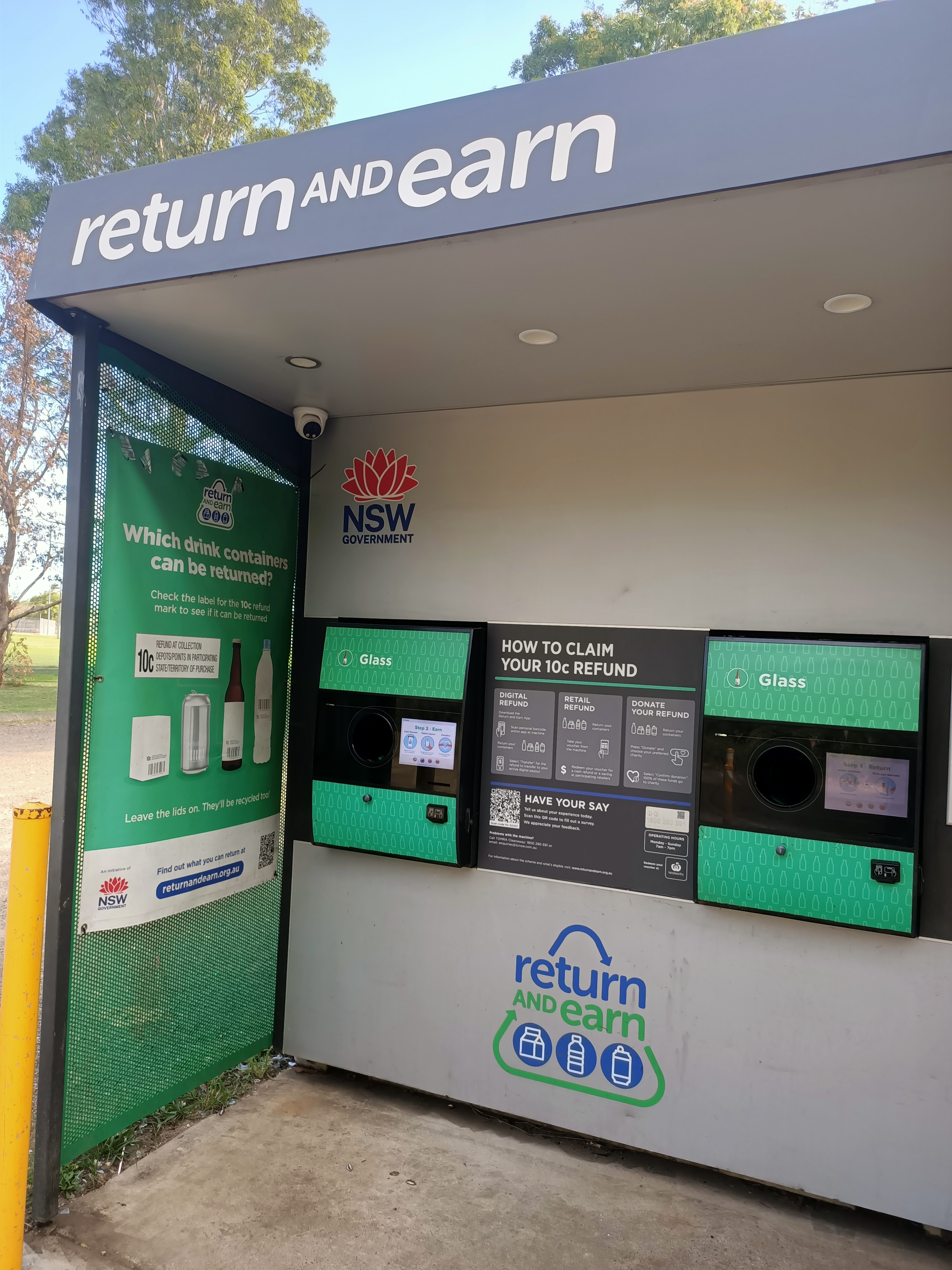
Reverse vending machine used in New South Wales' Return and Earn scheme.

In Australia, reverse vending machines are used as part of recycling schemes where consumers can return eligible drink containers for a 10 cent refund at automated collection points. By 2025, Australia became the first continent to have a container deposit scheme in every jurisdiction, after Tasmania became the final state to implement the scheme and installed over 100 reverse vending machines.

=== Russia ===
Other parts of the world are continuing to adopt reverse vending machines through the use of both public and private joint ventures. For example, the Russian food retailer, X5 Group, initiated a partnership with Coca-Cola in Pyaterochka, Moscow, to supply RVMs in neighborhood areas with high foot traffic. Unilever has also supported the use of RVMs in Moscow in 2019, where they installed seven in Perekrestok and three in Moscow, through a pilot project to promote plastic collection and recycling initiatives, by issuing 10% coupons for Unilever products in the respective storefronts.

Russia has illustrated a focus on RVMs with one of its most significant food retailers joining forces with a global beverage producer to enact RVMs in numerous shops across the country with a discount coupon of 15% to reduce waste.

=== West Asia ===
In Türkiye, a nationwide Deposit Return System (DBYS) is set to be launched in 2025, and is planned to reach the extent of largest European systems. Contrary to conventional models, the system omits paper vouchers entirely and instead employs a centralized, fintech-style mobile app known as DOA ("Depozitosu Olan Ambalajlar"). Consumers register using their national ID number and immediately receive deposit refunds into their e-wallet after returning designated beverage containers—including aluminum cans, PET bottles, and glass bottles (with glass processed via crushing modules)—at accredited reverse vending machines or manual collection points in Türkiye. This digital structure significantly reduces operational and environmental costs, enhances transparency, and minimizes fraud by centralizing all transactions.

== Advantages ==
The reverse vending machine has several environmental and economic benefits. A person can be rewarded a monetary gain or other rewards by disposing of their waste, such as plastic bottles. This economic benefit is an incentive for people to dispose of their waste correctly. With landfills receiving 27 million tons of plastic in 2018, the adoption of reverse vending machines attempts to combat waste by providing a convenient proper disposal method. The machine's design allows the user to only insert the item in, and no other action is required. The combined convenience and user-facing simplicity of such machines enables the correct sorting of waste by type and material, so it does not end up dumped in the environment. One of the focal points of having a reverse vending machine rather than a traditional recycling bin is the use of a crusher which allows for a larger capacity of storing waste.

== Disadvantages ==
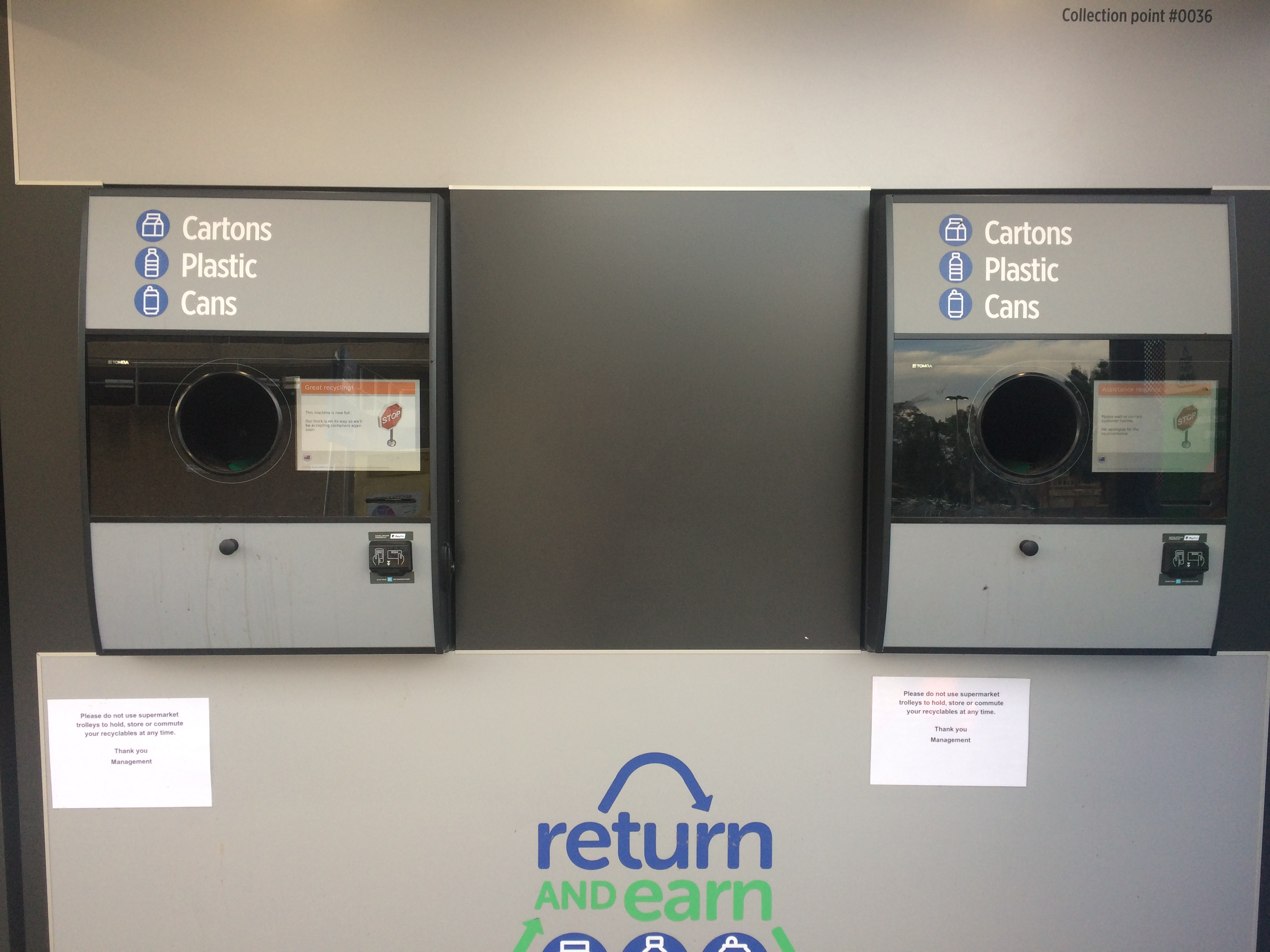
Reverse vending machine in Wagga Wagga, NSW, Australia that rewards 10 cents for each returned bottle

Despite the efficiencies found in reverse vending machines, their high acquisition costs are a disadvantage, as machines typically cost more than $6,000. Due to these costs, private business owners typically cannot afford to acquire and manage the machines. As a result, government-affiliated and non-profit interest groups have worked with companies like TOMRA to initiate policies and joint venture programs to promote the use of reverse vending machines to the public. As more corporations and private businesses begin to enter the RVM market, costs are expected to decrease and become a more common alternative to traditional recycling methods.

Aside from an economic perspective, RVMs are subject to constant checkups, updates, and maintenance procedures which enable the artificial intelligence software to continue scanning and collecting data on the recyclable bottles. Despite the convenience that reverse vending machines offer their users, the monetary rewards may be perceived as too insignificant to incentivize recycling from the general public.

== See also ==
- Circular economy
- Container-deposit legislation
- Deposit-refund system
- Plastic pollution
- Recycling
