= Plastic Pollution Coalition =

- Abbreviation: PPC
- Formation: October 2009
- Founders: Manuel Maqueda; Daniella Russo; Lisa Boyle; Dianna Cohen; Julia Cohen
- Type: Advocacy group; social movement organization
- Headquarters: United States
- Region served: Worldwide
- Methods: Advocacy; litigation; public campaigns; internet activism
- Parent organization: Earth Island Institute

The Plastic Pollution Coalition (PPC) is an advocacy group and social movement organization which seeks to reduce plastic pollution. PPC operates under the fiscal sponsorship of the umbrella organization Earth Island Institute.

== Positions ==
PPC asserts that plastic recycling is unhelpful. Instead, they endorse taxes on plastic bags, propose the elimination of single-use plastics, and emphasize producer responsibility for the end-life of their products. PPC has advocated for the discontinuation of single-use plastic drinking straws, describing this as a "gateway issue to help people start thinking about the global plastic pollution problem". PPC prioritizes changing legal structures and producer responsibility against a perceived over-emphasis on individual responsibility for recycling.

== History ==
PPC was founded by Manuel Maqueda, Daniella Russo, Lisa Boyle, Dianna Cohen and Julia Cohen in October 2009. The organization is primarily involved in internet activism. In 2010, PPC was the host of TEDx event "Great Pacific Garbage Patch: The Global Plastic Pollution Crisis" discussing the Pacific trash vortex. From April 2011 until June 2014, PPC operated a news website called The Plastic Free Times.

In 2017, an advocacy video for the Plastic Pollution Coalition was made featuring the top 11 finalists from the 10th season of American Idol. PPC alleges that American Idol producer 19 Entertainment contributed to the video and then demanded that it be removed from the internet under pressure from corporate sponsors.

A couple of the organization's markets have become home to Sustain L.A. Refill Station, a business aimed at supplying customers with some of the products that are hardest to obtain without also buying new plastic bottles — shampoo, hair conditioner, liquid soap, laundry detergent and household cleaners.

=== Legal cases ===
In 2015, PPC and the environmental law firm Greenfire sued 3,000 plastic manufacturers in California for allegedly violating stormwater permitting requirements of the Clean Water Act.

In April 2020, PPC and the Earth Island Institute filed a lawsuit against Clorox, Coca-Cola, Mars, Nestlé, PepsiCo, Procter and Gamble in California superior courts alleging that these companies of polluting waterways, coasts, and oceans with millions of tons of plastic packaging. The suit claims they violations of the California Consumers Legal Remedies Act, public nuisance, breach of express warranty, defective product liability, negligence, and failure to warn of the harms caused by their plastic packaging. The American Beverage Association responded to the suit with a statement by saying some of their members' are actively addressing the problem of plastic pollution. The suit claims that the defendant companies collectively produce about 15% of all single-use plastic packaging.

== Endorsements ==
PPC has used celebrity endorsements to attract support. One video produced by PPC featuring actor Jeff Bridges was viewed by hundreds of thousands of people. Celebrity supporters include Jeff Franklin, Jeff Bridges, Alexandra Paul, Amy Smart, and Ben Harper

== Criticism ==
PPC has campaigned to pressure companies to discontinue plastic packaging. Albe Zakes, spokesman for TerraCycle, while expressing support for PPC's goals, has questioned whether switching to glass bottles instead of plastic is better for the environment. In 2021, a Netflix documentary Seaspiracy criticised PPC for not speaking up about the plastic pollution from the commercial fishing industry. It implied that PPC was dependent on revenues from fishing, being the subsidiary of Earth Island Institute.

== Similar organizations ==
Other similar organizations working to reduce plastic pollution include 5 Gyres, Break Free From Plastic, Changing Tides Foundation, Friends of Ocean Action, Greenpeace, Lonely Whale, Marine Litter Solutions, OceanCare, Ocean Conservancy, Oceana, Parley for the Oceans, Sea Shepherd Conservation Society, Surfrider Foundation, The Last Straw, the Plastic Soup Foundation and Plastic soup surfer Merijn Tinga.
