= Container-deposit legislation =

Return of empty containers for refund

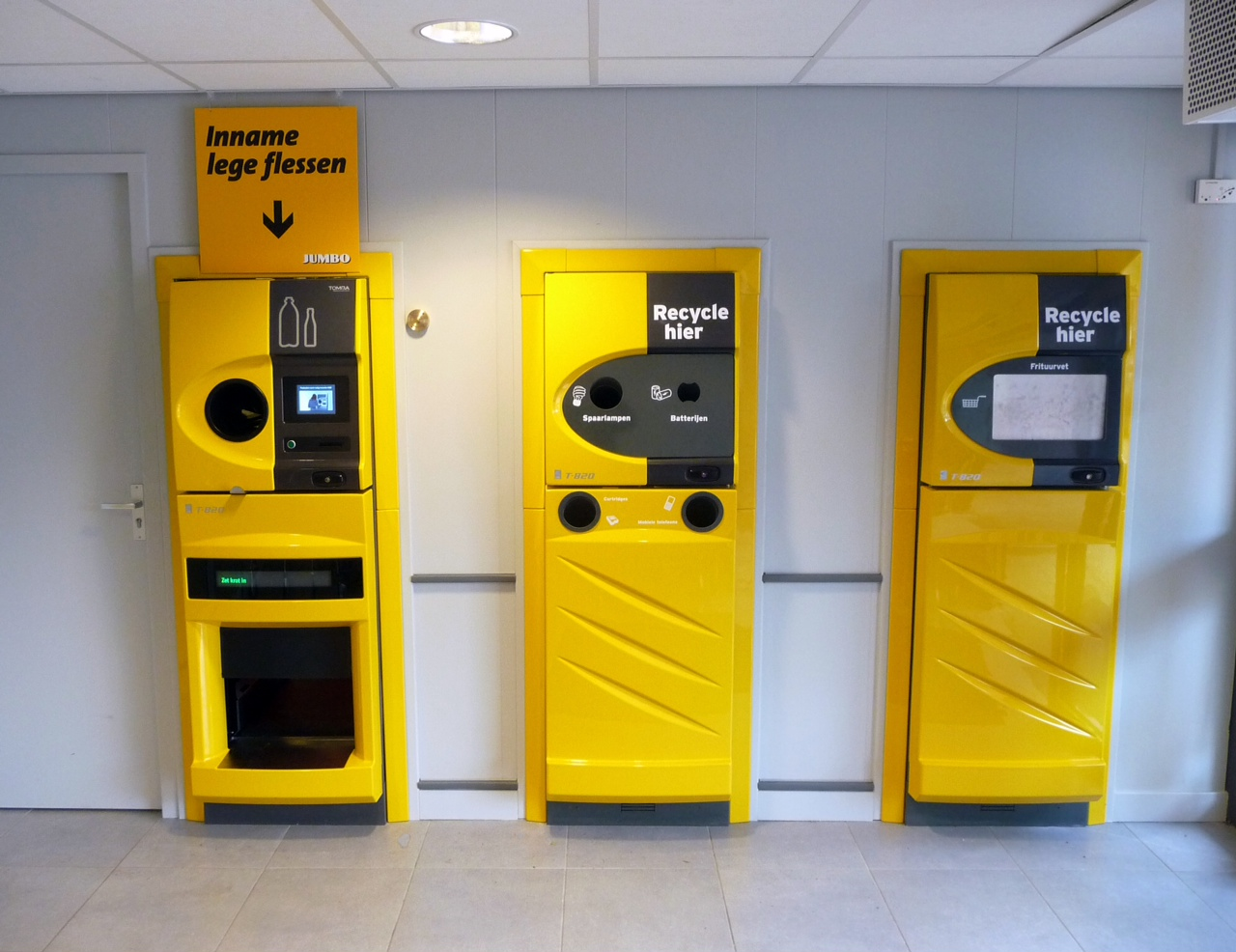
A deposit return machine for glass bottles, plastic bottles and bottle crates (left) in a Dutch supermarket

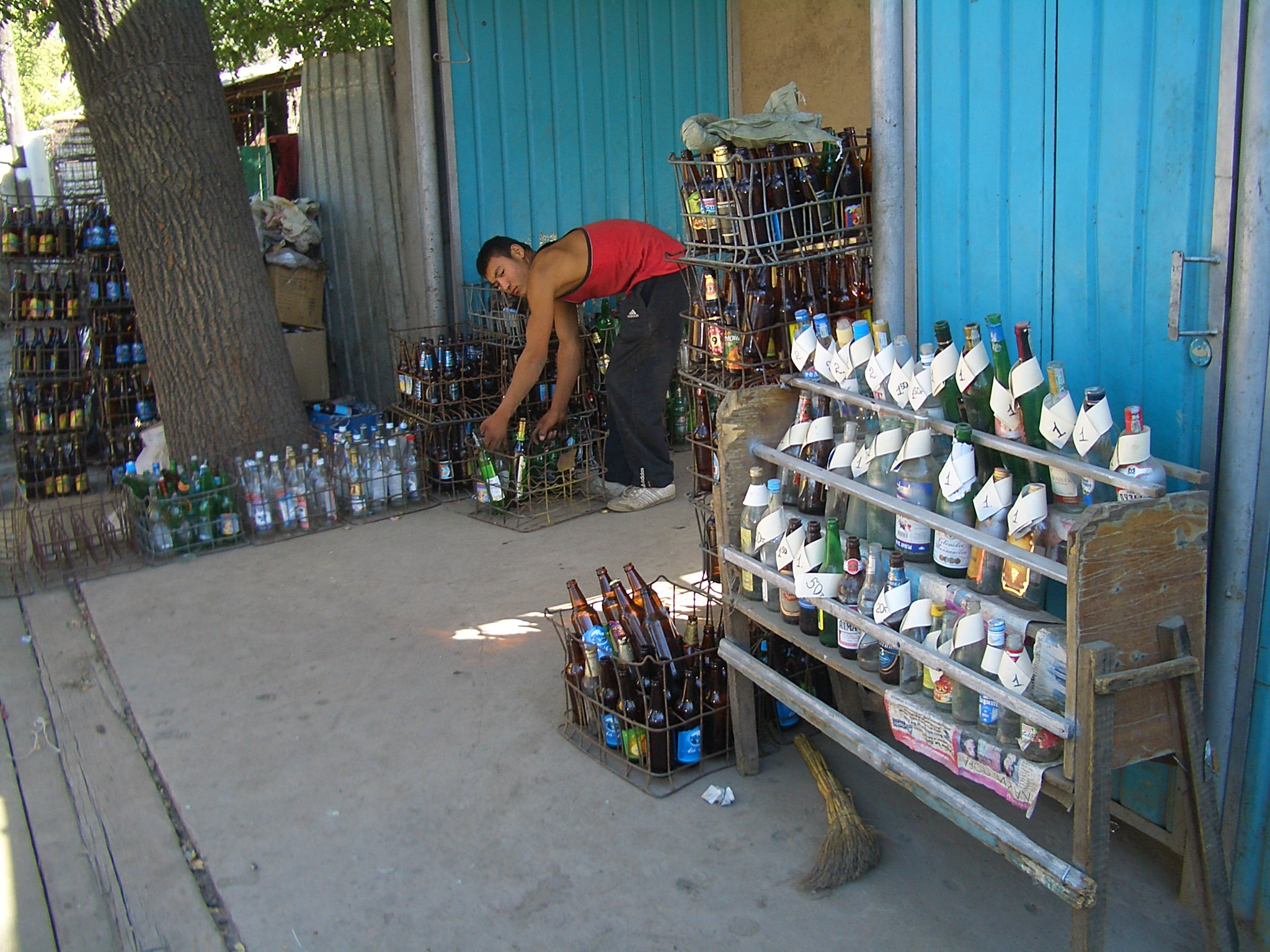
Refillable glass bottles collected, and deposits refunded, at a collection point in Bishkek, Kyrgyzstan. Deposit values (from 50 tyiyn to 2 Kyrgyz som, i.e. 2–5 U.S. cents) for various bottle types are posted next to the sample bottles on a rack.

Container-deposit legislation (also known as a container-deposit scheme, deposit-refund system or scheme, deposit-return system, or bottle bill) is any law that requires the collection of a monetary deposit on beverage containers (refillable or non-refillable) at the point of sale and/or the payment of refund value to the consumers. When the container is returned to an authorized redemption center, or retailer in some jurisdictions, the deposit is partly or fully refunded to the redeemer (presumed to be the original purchaser). It is a deposit-refund system.

Governments may pass container deposit legislation for several reasons, including to encourage recycling and complement existing curbside recycling programs; to reduce energy and material usage for containers, to reduce beverage container litter along highways, in lakes and rivers, and on other public or private properties (where beverage container litter occurs, a nominal deposit provides an economic incentive to clean it up, which can be a significant source of income to some poor individuals and non-profit civic organizations); and to extend the usable lifetime of taxpayer-funded landfills.

Deposits that are not redeemed are often kept by distributors or bottlers to cover the costs of the system (including handling fees paid to retailers or redemption centers to collect, sort, and handle the containers) or are escheated to the governmental entity involved to fund environmental programs. Studies have shown that container-deposit schemes are generally very successful in practice, with return rates commonly reaching up to 90% or more.

== History ==
A & R Thwaites & Co in Dublin, Ireland, announced in 1799 the provision of artificial "soda water" and that they paid 2 shillings a dozen for returned bottles. Schweppes, who were also in the business of artificially made mineral waters, had a similar recycling policy from about 1800, without any legislation. Scottish bottled beverage companies also voluntarily introduced such a scheme to encourage the return of their bottles for reuse. In Sweden a standard system for deposits on PET bottles and aluminium cans was established by legislation in 1984.

British Columbia's legislated deposit-return system, enacted in 1970, is the oldest such program in North America.

== Laws by country ==
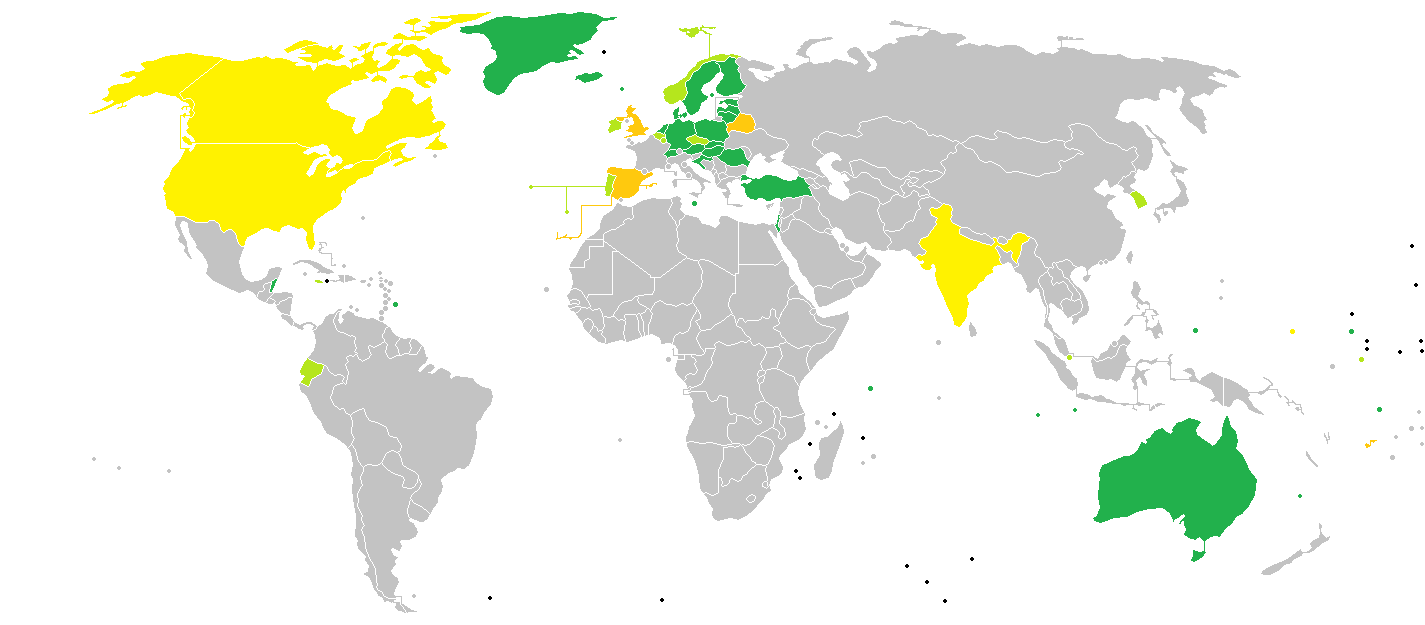
A map illustrating container-deposit legislation worldwide. _ Deposit scheme covering plastic, metal and glass. _ Deposit scheme covering 1 or 2 of plastic, metal and glass. _ Deposit schemes in some regions. _ Deposit scheme planned.

=== Overview ===
Container-deposit schemes by jurisdiction
Country	Implementation	Aluminium	Glass	PET	Beverages Covered	Driver	Ref.
Australia	1977–2025	Yes	Yes	Yes	Plastic, metal and glass drinks containers. Scope varies depending on state/territory.		
Austria	1990, last amended 2025	Yes	Yes	Yes	Beer and beer mixes, alcoholic beverage mixes, cider and other fermented beverages, juices and nectars, soft drinks, waters, wines and spirits	Government	
Barbados	1986, last amended 2019	Yes	Yes	Yes	Carbonated and non-carbonated soft drinks, mineral and soda water, beer and malt beverages	Government	
Belarus	TBA	Coming soon	Coming soon	Coming soon	All beverages except dairy-based products	Government	
Belgium	1993	No	Yes	No	Refillable beer containers	Government	
Belize	2009	Yes	Yes	Yes	Carbonated soft drinks, beer and other malt drinks, in plastic, metal (aluminium, steel) and glass containers, sized up to 3.79L.		
Canada	Various	Various	Various	Various	Varies by province/territory. Active in Alberta, British Columbia, Newfoundland and Labrador, New Brunswick, Northwest Territories, Nova Scotia, Ontario, Prince Edward Island, Quebec, Saskatchewan, and Yukon.		
Croatia	2005, last amended 2020	Yes	Yes	Yes	Containers >200mL: juices, water, beer, wine, hard liquor; Containers <200mL: milk and dairy products	Government	
Czech Republic	amended for 2026	Coming soon	Yes	Coming soon	Currently for glass bottles; planned for all containers for alcoholic (up to 15% ABV) and nonalcoholic drinks	Government	
Denmark	1981, last amended 2020	Yes	Yes	Yes	Beer, carbonated and uncarbonated soft drinks, energy drinks, fermented drink products (excluding wine and spirits), cider, alcoholic and non-alcoholic mixer products, mineral water, juice	Industry (1922) Government (1981)	
Ecuador	2012	No	No	Yes	Alcoholic, non-alcoholic, carbonated, and non-carbonated beverages	Government	
Estonia	2005	Yes	Yes	Yes	Soft drinks, water, beer, cider, juice, nectars and juice concentrate, low-ethanol alcoholic beverages (≤ 6% alcohol by volume)	Government	
Fiji	TBA	Coming soon	Coming soon	Coming soon	TBA	Government	
Finland	1996 (cans) / 2008 (PET) / 2012 (glass)	Yes	Yes	Yes	Almost all soft drinks, water, beer, cider, long drinks, sport drinks, juice, liquor/spirits/wine sold by Alko	Government or Manufacturer	
Germany	2003, last amended 2024 (milk)	Yes	Yes	Yes	Beer, soft drinks (carbonated and non-carbonated), water, mixed alcoholic drinks, juice in PET bottles, milk in PET bottles	Manufacturer	
Hungary	2024	Yes	Yes	Yes	Ready-to-drink or concentrated beverages (except milk and milk-based beverages), in single-use aluminum cans and glass/plastic bottles, ranging from 0.1 litres to 3 litres in size.		
Iceland	1989	Yes	Yes	Yes	All ready-to-drink beverages, wine and liquor	Government	
Ireland	2024	Yes	No	Yes	All beverages except dairy products	Government	
Israel	2001, last amended 2010	Yes	Yes	Yes	All containers between 100mL and 5L	Government	
Jamaica	2021	No	No	Yes	Unknown	Government	
Latvia	2022	Yes	Yes	Yes	Water, mineral water, lemonade, energy drinks, tea, juices and nectars, beer, wine coolers and mixed drinks with less than 6% alcohol content	Government	
Lithuania	2016	Yes	Yes	Yes	Beer and beer cocktails, cider and perry, fruit wine and fruit-wine-based drinks, soft drinks, water, kvass, juices and nectar	Government	
Luxembourg	2023	No	Yes	No	All beverages	Government	
Kiribati	2005	Yes	No	Yes	Beer, soft drinks, water	Government	
Malta	2022	Yes	Yes	Yes	Water, carbonated and non-carbonated soft drinks, ciders, beers, ready-to-drink coffee, and dilutables	Manufacturer	
Micronesia (Kosrae, Pohnpei, Yap)	1991, last amended in 2007	Yes (except in Pohnpei)	Yes	Yes (except in Pohnpei)	Unknown	Government	
India (Maharashtra)	2018, last amended 2019	No	No	Yes	Unknown	Government	
Marshall Islands	2018	Yes	Yes	Yes	All beverages, in plastic (PET), metal (aluminum) and glass containers, sized over 0.946L.		
Netherlands	1991, last amended 2021	Yes	Yes	Yes	Beer, water, soft drinks; system is opt-in for fruit juice producers	Government	
Norway	1997, last amended 1999	Yes	No	Yes	Soft drinks, water, juice, alcoholic beverages, and some supplements.	Government	
Palau	2011	Yes	Yes	Yes	Beer and ales, mixed wine and spirits, tea and coffee-based drinks, soda, non-carbonated water, all non-alcoholic drinks	Government	
Poland	2025	Yes	Yes	Yes	All single-use plastic beverage containers up to 3L, metal cans of up to 1L and reusable glass bottles up to 1.5L.	Government	
Portugal	2026	Yes	No	Yes	Bottled water, carbonated soft drinks, juices and nectars, energy drinks, beer, cider, and flavoured alcoholic beverages like alcopops		
Romania	2023	Yes	Yes	Yes	All beverages (except milk) in single-use containers up to 3 liters	Government	
Seychelles	2007	Yes	Yes	Yes	Unknown	Government	
Singapore	2025	Yes	No	Yes	Unknown	Government	
Slovakia	2022	Yes	Yes	Yes	Water, beer, juices, wine	Government	
South Korea	1985, last amended 2003	No	Yes	No	Alcoholic drinks, such as soju and beer, carbonated soft drinks	Government	
Sweden	1886, last amended 2022	Yes	Yes	Yes	All ready-to-drink beverages, excluding dairy	Government	
Spain	2029	Coming soon	No	Coming soon	Plastic bottles, aluminium cans and cartons up to 3 litres. Starts 2029.		
Switzerland	2001	Yes	Yes	Yes	All beverages in refillable containers, one-way soft drinks, beer and mineral water; not implemented	Government	
Turkey	2022	Yes	Yes	Yes	Tea and coffee, carbonated soft drinks, energy drinks, cow milk, fruit and vegetable juices, water (sparkling and non-sparkling), sports drinks, alcoholic beverages	Government	
Tuvalu		Yes	Yes	Yes	Mineral water (in PET bottles), sweetened drinks (in PET bottles and cans) and alcohol drinks (in cans), in plastic (PET), metal (aluminium) and glass containers.		
United Kingdom	2027	Coming soon	No (except in Wales)	Coming soon	PET, aluminium and steel containers with a capacity between 150ml and 3 litres. Glass containers only in scope in Wales. Starts October 2027.	Government	
United States	Various	Various	Various	Various	Varies by state. Active in California, Connecticut, Hawaii, Iowa, Maine, Massachusetts, Michigan, New York, Oregon, Vermont.		

=== Africa ===
==== Kenya ====
By 2005, the beverage industry in Kenya applied a deposit-refund system for glass bottles that had proven to be popular amongst wholesalers, retailers and consumers alike to participate in, not just in Nairobi, but throughout the country. At the time, there was a deposit of 10 Kenyan shillings on soft drink bottles, and 25 shillings on beer bottles.

==== South Africa ====
Although there is no formalised deposit-return scheme for packaging or plastics in South Africa, individual companies such as Coca-Cola have implemented deposit-return schemes for their own products with success. Manufacturers introduced this system without involvement of the government around 1948. Approximately 75% of beer containers, 45% of soft drink containers, and some wine and spirits bottles participate in the scheme. South Africa was noted in 2012 as one of the few countries that included plastic bottles in its schemes. Aside from bottles, similar deposit-refund schemes exist in South Africa for batteries, cars, and tyres.

=== Americas ===
Container-deposit legislation in North America: Container deposits on most bottles and cans Container deposits only on beer/alcoholic beverage containers Container deposits discontinued No container deposits

By 1998, there were voluntary deposit-refund schemes for glass containers in Barbados, Bolivia, Brazil, Chile, Colombia, Ecuador, Jamaica, Mexico and Venezuela.

==== Canada ====
In 1970, British Columbia became the first Canadian province to establish a mandatory deposit-return system for soft drinks and beer containers. As of 2021, nearly all provinces and territories in Canada have followed suit; the territory of Nunavut is the only jurisdiction in Canada that has yet to implement some sort of deposit refund system. In Ontario, only containers of alcoholic beverages come with deposits, in Manitoba only beer containers participate in the deposit scheme.

Deposits range from CAD$0.05 to CAD$0.40 per unit depending on the material and size of the container and whether the container contains an alcoholic or non-alcoholic beverage.

Below is a brief summary of each program:

- British Columbia: While the original program covered only carbonated soft drinks and beer, the deposit legislation expanded to include any ready-to-serve beverage sold in a container that is sealed by its manufacturer (e.g. bottled water, juice, new age drinks, and alcohol). There are currently two stewardship agencies in BC that carry out deposit-refund obligations on behalf of beverage producers: Encorp Pacific (for non-alcoholic beverages, wine, spirits, some ciders and coolers, and some import beer) and Brewers Distributor Ltd. (BDL) (for domestic coolers, beers, and ciders). In 2017, BC's program recovered over 1 billion containers for an overall return-rate of 75.8%. Bottle deposit on single use beverage containers have increased to CDN $0.10 from CDN $0.05 in November 2019. As of February 2022 milk and milk substitute containers are also refundable.
- Alberta: All beverage containers (glass bottles, metal cans, Tetra Paks, gable-top cartons, bags-in-boxes, plastic bottles and jugs, drink pouches), including milk containers (Alberta was the first jurisdiction in North America to accept and charge a deposit on milk containers in June 2009), are charged deposits at the point of sale; 10¢ for containers 1 L or less, and 25¢ for containers larger than 1 L. Containers can be dropped off at depots and are picked up by the Alberta Beverage Container Recycling Corporation. In 2014, over 2 billion beverage containers were returned to Alberta depots for an overall return rate of 83%.
- Saskatchewan: Established in 1988, Saskatchewan's deposit-return program applies to all ready-to-serve beverage containers, except those for meal replacements, or dietary supplements. SARCAN began taking milk and milk substitutes on April 1, 2017. SARCAN Recycling is responsible for administering the program and operates under contract to the Saskatchewan Ministry of Environment. In fiscal 2014–2015, a total of 405.6 million beverage containers were returned to SARCAN recycling depots for an overall container return rate of 87%.
- Manitoba: Manitoba's program was implemented in 2010 and is limited to beer containers, which are charged a deposit of CAD$0.10 or $0.20 depending on the size. Other containers (except milk) are charged a non-refundable $0.02 per unit levy (Container Recycling Fee) and can be recycled in municipal curbside recycling programs.
- Ontario: The Ontario Deposit Return Program (ODRP), which came into force in February 2007, is a voluntary program implemented by the provincial government that covers wine, spirits, and imported beer containers (plastics, metal, bimetal, glass, gable top, Tetra Pak, bag-in-box containers). Because there is no law mandating that wine and spirits be placed on deposit, they may be added to municipal blue box programs voluntarily. Refillable and non-refillable beer containers are collected through a separate program administered and operated by Brewers Retail Inc. (The Beer Store). Alcoholic beverage containers, as well as any associated packaging, can be returned to 443 beer store locations, 113 breweries (beer containers only), 141 retail partner stores, 63 LCBO northern agency stores, 4 additional LCBO stores, and 115 empty bottle dealers (small independent depots contracted in more remote locations where beer retailers are not available), for a total of 879 redemption locations. TBS trucks collect these empty containers and back-haul them to various distribution centres where recyclables are sent to a processing facility for sorting, baling, and shipping to market. Refillable bottles are sent back to the brewers for washing and refill. Containers returned through Ontario's deposit-return system showed a total recycling rate of 89% for 2014–2015, while refillable beer bottles were returned at a rate of 98%.

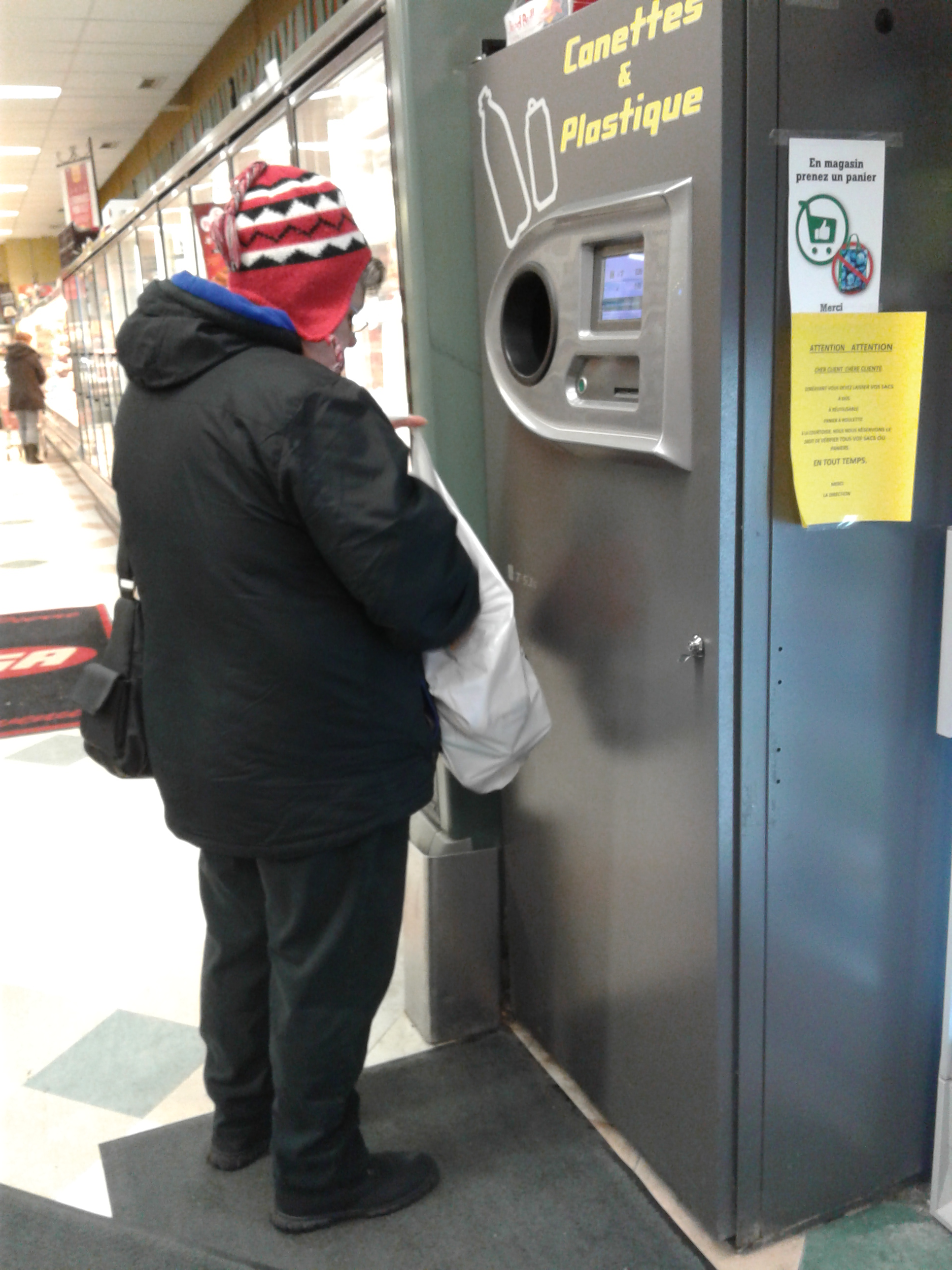
A reverse vending machine in a Montreal grocery store

- Quebec: Quebec's deposit-return system was established in 1984 and covers beer and carbonated soft drink containers. As of March 1, 2025, ready-to-drink beverages ranging from 100ml to 2L carry a $0.10 deposit. Boissons Gazeuses Environnement (BGE) administers the program for non-refillable soft-drink containers on behalf of industry, while Recyc-Quebec oversees the beer container collection program. In 2014, the recycling rate for containers recovered via the deposit-return system was 78% (includes data for refillable bottles).
- New Brunswick: This program was created in 1992 and covers all ready-to-drink, non-refillable beverage containers 5 L and under, including soft-drinks, beer, wine, spirits, flavoured waters, fruit juices, vegetable juices, and low alcohol drinks. Containers for milk and milk products (and substitutes) as well as processed apple cider are exempt. Encorp Atlantic Inc. is the stewardship agency responsible for managing the collection, transportation, and partial processing of non-alcoholic beverage containers on behalf of brand-owners, and New Brunswick Liquor (NB Liquor) is responsible for the collection of alcoholic beverage containers. Program oversight is the responsibility of the Department of Environment. New Brunswick's deposit-return program is somewhat unique in that it operates under a "half-back" model where only half of the original deposit is refunded to the consumer when a container is returned for recycling. The unrefunded portion of the deposit is used to cover the costs of administering the program and part of it also goes towards the province's Environmental Trust Fund, which is used for environmental conservation and other provincial initiatives aimed at reducing waste. In 2014, New Brunswick's recycling rate for non-refillable containers was 73%.
- Newfoundland and Labrador: In 1996 the provincial government established The Multi Materials Stewardship Board (MMSB) as a self funded crown agency, Intended to develop, implement and manage waste diversion programs for various specific waste streams, province wide. The following year MMSB began a licensing and standardization framework for recycling depots. Branded as Green Depot, all locations are independently owned and operated enterprises. There are 55 Green Depots province wide accepting non refillable ready-to-serve beverage containers for refund, excluding those for milk & milk alternatives, infant formula, meal replacement, beverage concentrates, distilled water bottles and containers over 5 liters. Refillable glass beer bottles are not included in MMSB's used beverage container program as local brewers regulate refillable beer bottle return. Brewers agents, breweries, and most convenience stores selling beer will accept back these bottles for store credit or sometimes cash at 10¢ per bottle being a full return of the initial deposit. A limited number of Green Depots do accept back refillable glass beer bottles for a 5¢ return depending on their location. Non refillable deposits sit in two categories with containers for non-alcoholic drinks, beer, miniature spirit bottles under 50ml and spirits in tetra-pak, gable top and pouch type containers being charged an 8¢ deposit and refunding 5¢. Containers for spirits primarily in larger glass and plastic bottles charge a deposit of 20¢ and refund at 10¢. Since 1997 over 3.37 billion containers have been diverted from landfill through Newfoundland and Labrador Green Depots. Additionally since 2013 Hebert's Recycling inc, has been collecting and processing all recyclable containers from Green Depot locations using its patented Enviopactor system of truck mounted recycling compactors to streamline recycling shipments from depots to centralized facilities.
- Nova Scotia: Launched on 1 April 1996, Nova Scotia's deposit-return program applies to all ready-to-drink beverage containers excluding milk, milk products, soya milk and rice beverages. Other containers that are exempt from the program are certain meal replacements, formulated liquid diets, foods for very low energy diets, thickened juices, baby formulas, concentrates and non-alcoholic beverages in containers of 5 L or more. The organization responsible for managing the program is DivertNS (formerly the Resource Recovery Fund Board Inc.). Like New Brunswick's program, Nova Scotia's deposit-return system is based on a "half-back" model where only half of the original deposit paid per container is refunded to the consumer. The non-refundable portion of the deposit is used as revenue by DivertNS to help pay for program costs. In 2014, the program collected 334 million non-refillable beverage containers for a recycling rate of 84%.
- Prince Edward Island: The province's deposit-return system was launched on 3 May 2008 as a replacement to a law that had prohibited the sale of non-refillable soft drink containers. The program is overseen and administered by the Department of Environment, Energy and Forestry and covers all ready-to-drink beverage containers up to 5 L, except those used for dairy products, milk substitutes or nutritional supplements. Similar to the other Atlantic provinces, PEI's deposit-return system is based on a "half-back" model where only 50% of the original deposit paid is refunded to the consumer when he/she returns the empty container to a depot. In 2014–2015, PEI had a non-refillable beverage container recycling rate of 80% and a total container recycling rate of 82%.
- Yukon: Introduced in 1992, Yukon's deposit-return program covers all ready-to-drink beverage containers (glass, plastic, steel, aluminium, and Tetra Pak), excluding those containing milk and milk substitutes. The program is managed by the Department of Community Services and requires consumers to pay a surcharge on the purchase of certain beverage containers, which includes a refundable deposit and a non-refundable recycling fund fee (RFF). Upon return of the empty container to a depot or processor, a portion of the surcharge (the refundable deposit) is refunded to the consumer, while the non-refundable RFF is kept by the retailer and remitted to the territorial Recycling Fund, where unredeemed deposits also go. In 2014, Yukon had a non-refillable recycling rate of 82%. In May 2016, the Yukon government announced changes to the Beverage Container Regulation. These changes, which were expected to be implemented 1 August 2017, will affect the surcharges and refunds applicable to beverage containers including milk and milk substitutes and will simplify the regulation. Once the territory's new regulations kick in, all beverage containers will fall into two categories: (1) 750 ml and less, including all milk & milk substitutes (surcharge 10 cents, refund 5 cents), and (2) 750 ml and more (surcharge 35 cents, refund 25 cents).
- Northwest Territories: Launched on 1 November 2005, Northwest Territories' deposit-return program covers all ready-to-serve beverage containers made of glass, plastics, aluminium, bi-metal, and mixed materials, including juice, milk and liquid milk products (added February 2010), soda, water, beer, wine, liquor and other alcoholic beverages. Excluded from the program are containers for infant formula; containers for milk and liquid milk products smaller than 30 ml; and powder milk. The Department of Environment and Natural Resources (DNR) is responsible for administering the program. Similar to Yukon's program, the total surcharge per container includes a refundable deposit and a non-refundable handling fee. Whereas the refundable deposit is returned to the consumer when they return the beverage container to a depot, the non-refundable handing fee is put into the Environment Fund and is used to help cover program costs. In fiscal 2014, approximately 26 million beverage containers were returned for reuse or recycling, translating into an overall recycling rate of 89%.

==== Peru ====
Peru has a deposit on some bottles of 620 millilitres (ml).

==== United States ====
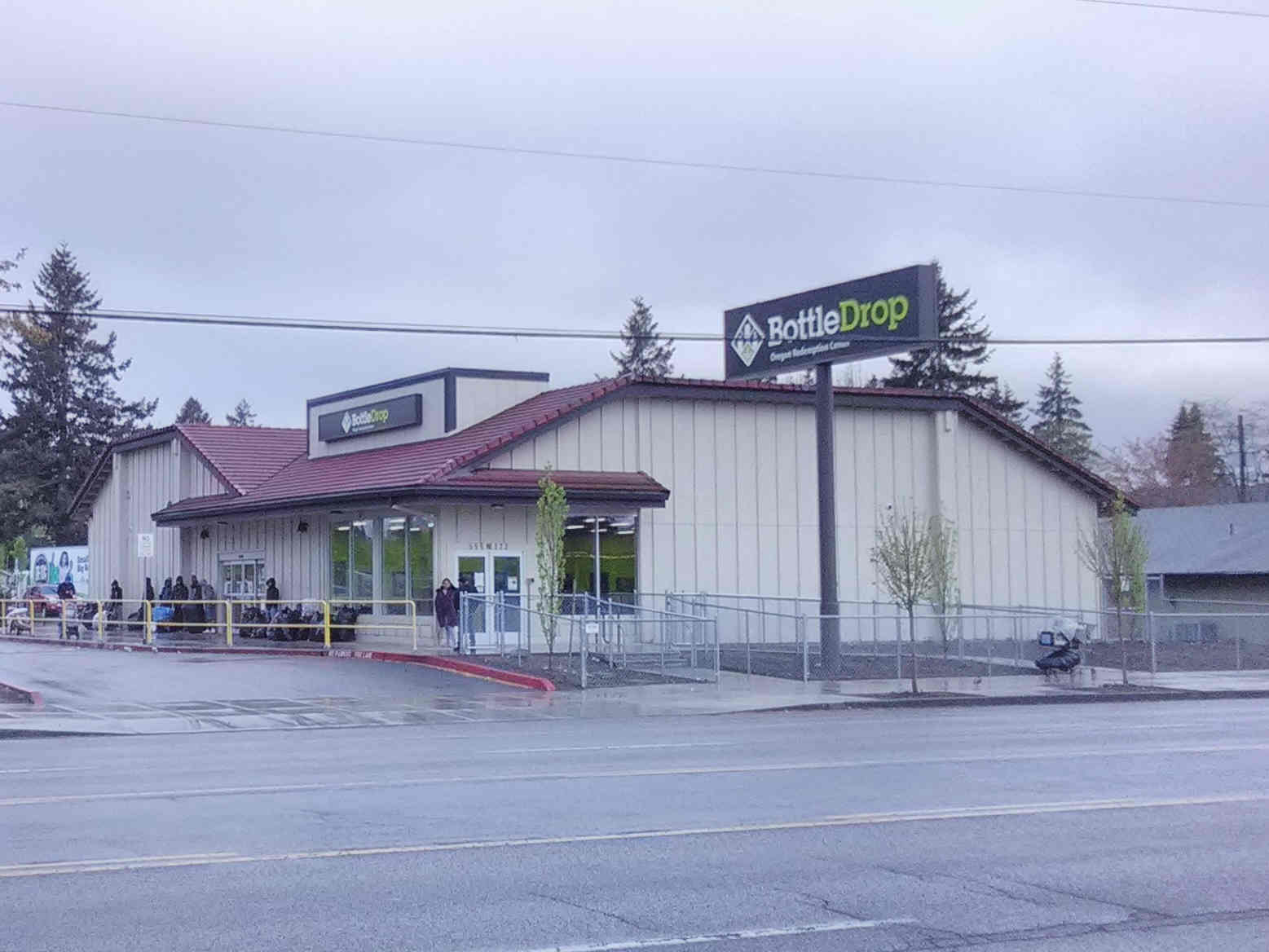
A beverage container redemption center in Oregon, USA

There are currently 11 states in the United States with the container deposit legislation.

- California: Enacted in 1981 and operated by CalRecycle, California's bottle bill charges a 5¢ refundable deposit on containers less than 24 US fluid ounces (710 ml), and 10¢ for containers 24 US fluid ounces (710 ml) or greater.
- Connecticut: Connecticut's bottle bill was introduced in 1980, but was expanded in 2009 to include bottled water. The deposit is the same for all container types and is 10¢.
- Hawaii: Hawaii's bottle bill has been in place since 2005 and is government-operated. A refundable deposit of 5¢ is charged on all plastic (PET, HDPE), metal, bi-metal, and glass beverage containers 2 l or less, except for milk and dairy products. In 2015, the system achieved a total return rate of 68%.
- Iowa: Introduced in 1979, The deposit is uniform across beverage categories and is currently 5¢. Unredeemed funds are kept by beverage distributors and it has been found to be highly profitable to them.
- Maine: Established in 1978 after a ballot initiative, Maine's bottle bill charges a 5¢ deposit on plastic, metal, and glass containers and 15¢ for most liquor and wine bottles.
- Massachusetts: The state's bottle bill was effective as of January 17, 1983. The deposit levied is 5¢.
- Michigan: Implemented in 1978, Michigan's bottle bill charges a 10¢ deposit on plastic, metal, glass, and paper containers less than 1 gallon.
- New York: New York's bottle bill has been in place since January 12, 1983. New York charges a 5¢ deposit on plastic, metal, and glass containers 3.78 l (1 gallon) or less.
- Oregon: The Oregon Bottle Bill, enacted in 1971, was the first container deposit legislation in the United States. The deposit/refund value is uniformly 10¢ per applicable container. The deposit is held by the beverage industry cooperative and they keep all the unclaimed deposit.
- Vermont: Implemented in 1973, Vermont's bottle bill charges a 5¢ deposit on plastic, metal, and glass beer, wine coolers and other malt beverages, soft drinks and other carbonated beverage containers. Most liquor and spirits bottles are charged a deposit of 15¢.

States that formerly had can deposit regulation:

- Delaware (5¢), introduced 1982, abolished 2009, replaced by Universal Recycling law.

=== Asia ===
==== Israel ====
In Israel, there is a 0.30-shekel (₪) deposit on beverage containers over 100 mL and under 5 L, except for dairy products. The system is operated by the ELA Recycling Corporation, a private non-profit organization owned by Israel's beverage manufacturers. Businesses are required to accept bottles if they sold them, or if they are over 28 square meters and sell beverages from the same manufacturer or importer. Businesses are not required to accept more than 50 bottles per customer per day. The deposit was initially ₪0.25, but was raised shortly after the ₪0.05 coin was discontinued.

In 2015, the system achieved a total return rate of 77%.

Most 500 ml beer bottles (local brands such as Goldstar and Maccabee plus certain imported ones like Carlsberg and Tuborg) have a deposit of ₪1.20, and are willingly accepted even by smaller businesses (plastic water bottles, glass wine bottles and soda cans are mostly accepted by larger supermarket chains, some of which possess reverse vending machines). In order to collect more products with its large storage area, Aco Recycling introduced G-1 Smart Reverse Vending Machines with 3 Shredder for Asofta; official operator for deposit scheme in Israel.

==== Japan ====
The container deposit legislation, as a monetary approach to the garbage/recycling problem, has never caught on in Japan. However, under increasingly ever stricter sorting rules announced by each town or city, garbage is meticulously sorted into kitchen garbage, newspapers/books, metal cans (washed)/plastic bottles (rinsed), garden weeds, etc. in each neighborhood for pickup by collection cars, usually on different days notified by the local government.

==== Singapore ====
In 2018, a privately driven project, in which the public were able to return plastic bottles and cans at three reverse vending machine for rewards, was launched. Subsequently, National Environment Agency rolled out a wider public initiative deploying at least 50 machines throughout Singapore from the end of 2019 onward. Encouraged by the response to the scheme, legislation was passed in 2023 to enforce compulsory enrollment all plastic bottles and cans sold in Singapore onto a deposit return scheme, but the scheme's public activation was delayed to 1 April 2026 from the previous year to allow drink producers and retailers to implement the scheme.

==== South Korea ====
By 1997, South Korea had introduced a deposit-refund system for beverage containers.

==== Taiwan ====
By 1997, Taiwan had introduced a deposit-refund scheme for PET soft drink bottles.

==== Turkey ====
In Turkey, a recycling pilot project was launched in 2018, where plastic bottles and cans could be deposited at vending machines at three Istanbul Metro stations in return for credit on a public transport ticket card. In 2021, the Turkish government decided to introduce deposit return system (DRS) by January 1, 2022, to protect Turkey's 8,000-kilometer coastline. The upcoming deposit refund scheme is expected to help reduce different types of litter, such as land and marine litter, and prohibit packaging waste from damaging landfills within the country. One of the main reasons the Turkish government has implemented DRS is that it will increase the recycling of plastic and glass containers by 250 percent and help turn the 811,000 tons of glass and plastic containers thrown into landfills each year into secondary raw materials.

=== Oceania ===
==== Australia ====
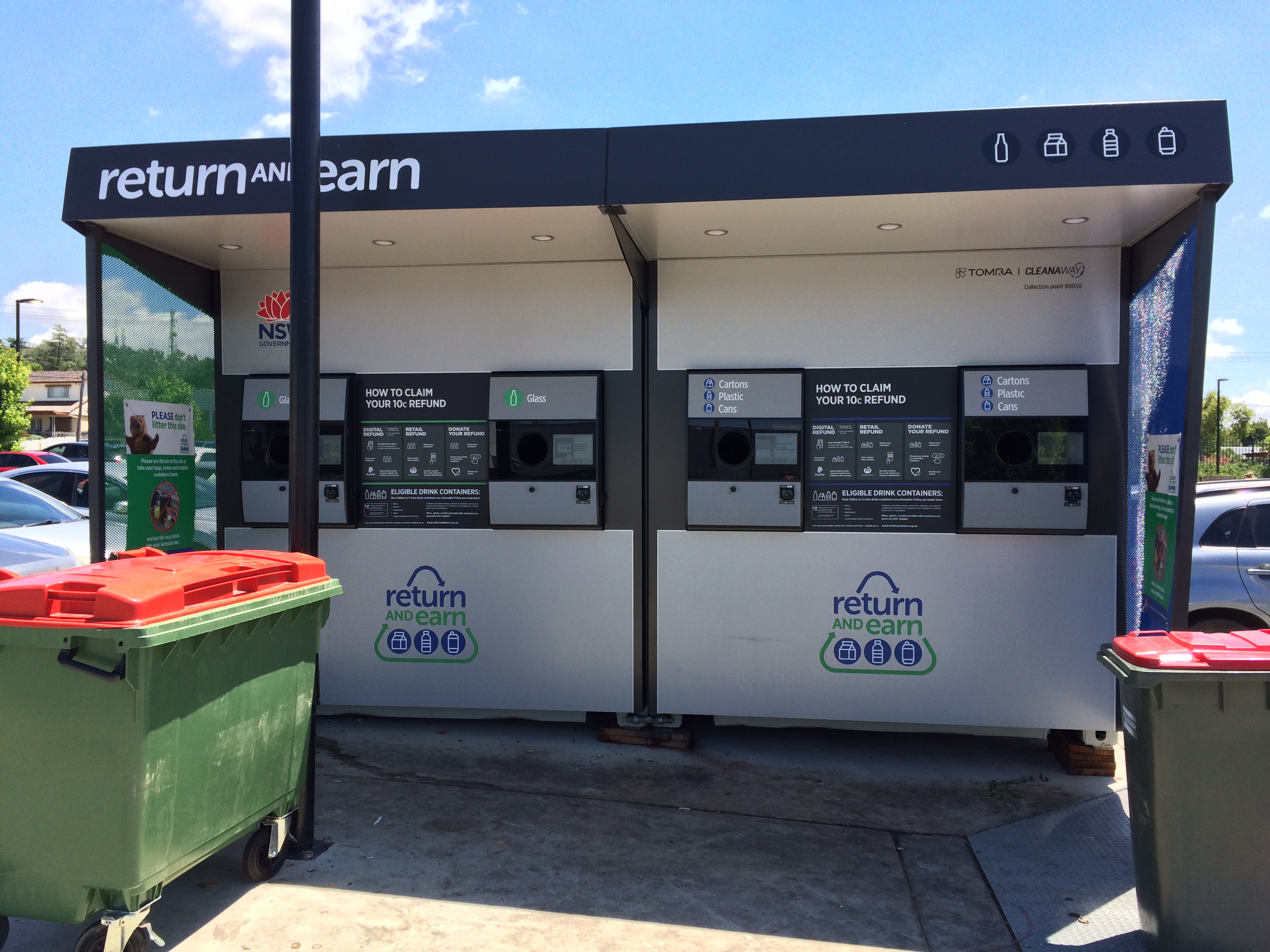
Reverse container vending machine in Kooringal, New South Wales

In the days when bottles were washed and re-used, drinks manufacturers paid for the return of their (proprietary) containers, but with the advent of single-use containers great savings were possible, leaving their disposal as the consumer's responsibility.

While a national scheme has been repeatedly delayed largely due to threats from the beverage industry of multi-million dollar advertisements against politicians who support it and earlier disagreements between states, there has been a growing momentum of state-based operated container deposit schemes (CDS). All states have implemented or will introduce a state-based container deposit scheme operating by 2023, with Victoria the final jurisdiction to support such a scheme. With 8 billion beverage containers landfilled or littered every year in Australia, proponents argue that it is the most effective method to reduce such litter; and improve recycling above that achieved by kerbside. It also has many co-benefits such as funds for charities and several thousand new jobs, that cannot be achieved by other approaches.

- The state of South Australia introduced a container deposit scheme in 1977. A refundable deposit of AUD 10 cents is charged per drinks carton, can or bottle (only containers marked as eligible for refund; currently does not include wine and spirit bottles, milk cartons, or concentrated/and or vegetable juice intended to be diluted before consumption), however the introduction of a 10-cent deposit on wine and spirit bottles is expected to be fully implemented by late 2027. As of 2023, the overall return rate is 76%.
- Northern Territory introduced a container deposit scheme in 2012. A 10-cent (AUD) refundable deposit is charged on all beverage containers with the exception of unflavoured milk, soy milk, cordial bottles (undiluted), concentrated fruit/vegetable juice intended to be diluted before consumption, and still or sparkling wine (in glass bottles). Unredeemed deposits remain with the producer/filler. In 2015–2016, the system achieved a total return rate of 54%.
- The state of New South Wales (the most populated state, with 7.5 million residents) announced that it would be adopting a 10-cent (AUD) deposit scheme, which commenced on 1 December 2017. Wine and spirit bottles are expected to be included in this deposit scheme by mid-2027. The program has achieved a return rate of 69%.
- On 22 July 2016, the Queensland government announced that the state would introduce a container deposit scheme which commenced on 1 November 2018. A 10 cent (AUD) refund is provided for empty drink containers between 150 ml and 3 l. The scheme was extended to wine and spirit bottles in Nov 2023.
- The state of Western Australia's scheme commenced on 1 October 2020. The scheme applies to certain empty drink containers ranging in size from 150 ml to 3 L and excludes domestically consumed drink containers such as wine and spirit bottles, milk and juice containers. The amount of the deposit/refund is AUD 10-cents.
- Victoria's Container Deposit Scheme (CDS Vic) was introduced on 1 November 2023 as part of its updated recycling and waste management policies, through scheme coordinator VicReturn. A 10 cent refund is provided to Victorians for every eligible drink container they return. Most aluminium, glass, plastic and liquid paperboard (carton) drink containers are accepted.
- Tasmania launched its scheme on 1 May 2025.

==== Fiji ====
The United Nations Development Programme had funded a feasibility study to look at the possibility of establishing a deposit-return system in Fiji, building on the experience gained from their successful projects in Kiribati and the Federated States of Micronesia.

In 2011, the Fijian Government approved the Environment Management Waste Disposal and Recycling Amendment Regulations 2011, and the Environment Management Container Deposit Regulations 2011. The Regulations provide the legal framework for the introduction of a container deposit and refund system, allowing beverage producers and importers to adjust pricing and accommodate deposits. The Regulations will also allow the Department of Environment to register and establish the Managing Agency that will administer Fiji's container deposit system, and establish a revolving fund account to receive all deposits paid by producers for all beverages sold. No further details are available.

==== New Zealand ====
Single-use containers were increasingly introduced between the 1950s and 1980s. New Zealand had no container-deposit legislation until 2008 when the Waste Minimisation Act 2008 passed into law. The Act has provision for product stewardship of which container-deposit legislation is the most familiar type. As of 2010 there is no widespread deposits available on containers with some beer bottles being a notable exception. The Ministry for the Environment is working on a container return scheme, which may be introduced in about 2023.

=== Europe ===
==== Austria ====
Austria has a container-deposit system for refillable PET and glas bottles since 1990. In 2025, Austria introduced a 25-cent deposit that is levied on all disposable plastic bottles from 100ml up to three litres and disposable aluminium cans in 2025.

==== Belgium ====
Smaller beer bottles (250 or 330 mL) carry a €0.10 deposit, and larger ones (750 mL or 1 L) a €0.20 one. Some fruit-juice bottles, such as those sold by Oxfam Wereldwinkels/Magasins du Monde, carry a €0.30 deposit. Some hard plastic milk and orange juice bottles such as those sold by Delhaize carry a €0.20 deposit. In April 2019 the Brussels Capital Region started a project to test out an expansion of the system to cans, which hold a €0.05 deposit. After the 2019 Belgian regional elections the new Brussels regional government decided to introduce the deposit system for cans, as well as for plastic bottles.

==== Bulgaria ====
In 2023, Schwarz Group, operating in Bulgaria under the Lidl and Kaufland brands introduced a voluntary buyback scheme in some of their supermarkets. They would pay BGN 0.05 per PET plastic bottle or aluminium can. With the introduction of the Euro as legal tender in 2026, one receives €0.02 per container as a voucher, which can be used in the same supermarket within 90 days.

==== Croatia ====
A deposit system for some glass bottles such as beer bottles existed since the time of Yugoslavia.

In 2006, a refundable deposit of 0.50 kn was first levied on non-refillable containers (except dairy products) with a minimum volume of 200 mL (7.0 imp fl oz; 6.8 US fl oz). Retailers over 200 m^{2} (2,200 ft^{2}) are obliged to take-back containers. Collection is often manual, although some collection occurs with reverse vending machines. Retailers must sort containers by material type (PET bottles, aluminium/steel cans, and glass bottles). The scheme is government operated and there is a collection target of 95%. In 2015, the scheme recovered up to 90% of all non-refillable containers placed on the Croatian market.

The plastic bottles for dairy products were later included in the system, then excluded from the system in late 2015, and then brought back into it in 2019.

With the introduction of the Euro as legal tender in 2023, the refundable deposit was converted to €0.07. In 2025, the deposit was increased to €0.10 per item.

==== Czech Republic ====
In the Czech Republic most beer is sold in returnable glass bottles that carry a CZK 3 deposit. These bottles are collected by shops and supermarkets. Reverse vending machines have mostly replaced human staff. There is also a CZK 100 deposit on plastic beer crates with a 20 bottle capacity. Most reverse vending machines accept an entire crate full of empty bottles, returning CZK 160. There is no deposit on other containers.

==== Denmark ====
In Denmark, the first national deposit-return system was introduced in 1922, when the Danish breweries agreed on a standardized glass bottle for beer and carbonized drinks, due to the limited resources available during and in the aftermath of World War I. In 1991 and 1993 this was expanded to also include plastic bottles. Aluminium beverage cans were forbidden from 1982 to 2002, but this ban was found to violate European Union law, and to get into compliance Denmark introduced new legislation in 2002, extending the deposit scheme to also cover aluminium cans.

The law covers beer (alcohol content >0.5% by volume), carbonated soft drinks (alcohol content 0-0.5%), energy drinks, mineral water, iced tea, ready-to-drink beverages, and mixer products (alcohol content 0.5%–10%); juice and uncarbonated soft drinks were added to the deposit scheme in 2019–2020. Excluded from the scheme are wine and spirits (alcohol content >10%), products containing milk, and containers larger than 20 liters. The deposit levels are as follows:

- Disposable aluminium and glass containers under 1 L and refillable glass bottles under 0.5 L, labelled "Pant A": DKK 1.
- Disposable and refillable plastic containers under 1 L, labelled "Pant B": DKK 1.5.
- Metal and plastic containers equal to or greater than 1 L or refillable glass bottles over 0.5 L, labelled "Pant C": DKK 3.

The deposit system operator is Dansk Retursystem A/S, a private non-profit organization. Most collection (95%) is done automatically using reverse vending machines, but some (5%) is done manually. In 2019, the system achieved a total return rate of 92%.

==== Estonia ====
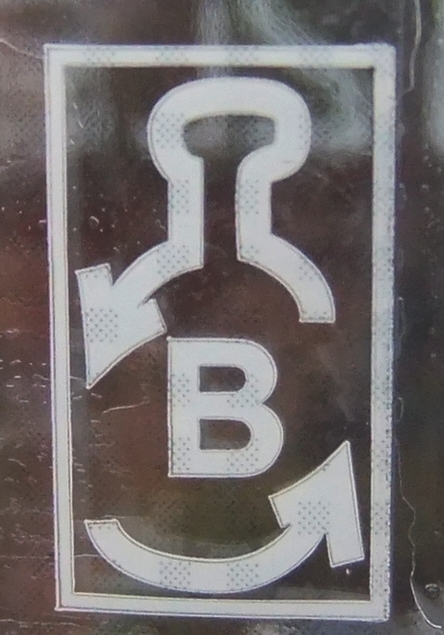
Deposit symbol in Estonia ("B" on a 1.5 L-bottle)

In Estonia there has been a universal deposit and recycling system since 2005 for one-time and refillable containers. This includes soft drinks, water, beer, cider, juice, juice concentrates, nectars, and low-ethanol alcoholic beverages (up to 6% volume). The deposit is €0.10 on most metal, plastic, and glass beverage containers. It does not include strong alcoholic beverages, such as wine or vodka, syrup bottles, glass jars, or Tetra Paks. Since 2019, the system has been set to also accept some out-of-system bottles within accepted categories, though people will not receive a deposit for those. The system is operated by Eesti Pandipakend OÜ, which is a producer responsibility organization representing the Estonian Association of Brewers, the Association of Producers of Soft Drinks, the Association of Importers of Soft Drinks and Beer, and the Estonian Retailers Association.

In 2015, 90% of all PET bottles, 70% of all aluminium cans and 87% of all glass bottles sold in Estonia were returned for recycling and/or reuse. The overall return rate was 82.3%.

==== Finland ====
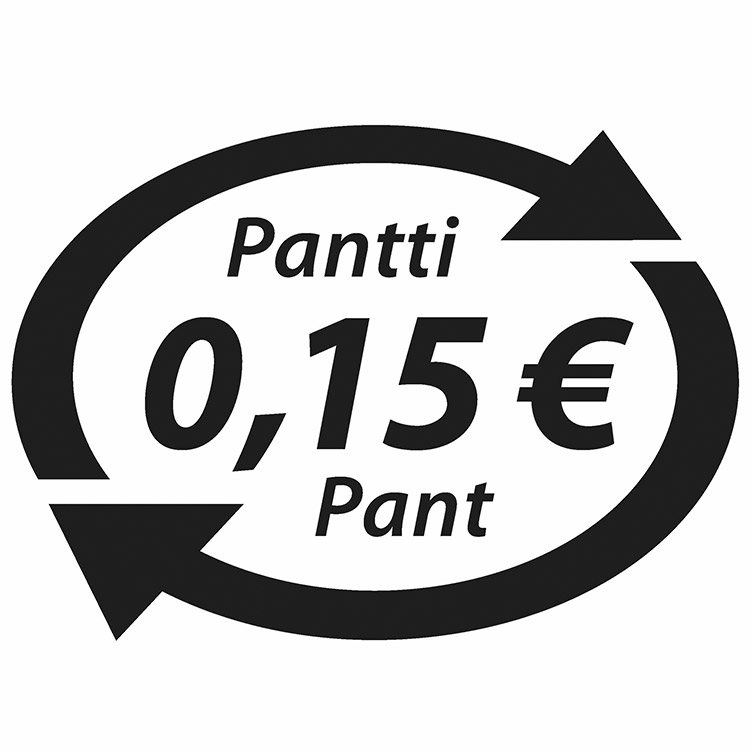
Deposit mark for 0,15 EUR in Finland

Deposit system was first introduced to Finland in 1952 along with summer Olympic Games which brought Coca-Cola to the country – in glass bottles. In the 1980s some re-usable and durable plastic bottles were included in the deposit system. Deposits were introduced on aluminium cans in 1996, on PET bottles in 2008, and on recycled glass bottles in 2012. Almost all soft drinks are covered by the program, in addition to water, beer, cider, long drinks, sport drinks, juice, and liquor/spirits/wine sold by Alko. Milk and other products packed in liquid packaging board are exempt. The system is administered by Suomen palautuspakkaus Oy (abbr. Palpa), which is a private consortium of beverage importers and manufacturers. In 2016, aluminium cans were recovered at a rate of 96%, PET bottles 92%, and one-way glass 88%. The deposit values for these containers are as follows:

- Plastic <0.35 L: €0.10
- Plastic 0.35–1 L: €0.20
- Plastic >1 L: €0.40
- Metal: €0.15
- Glass: €0.10

The scheme is, in technical sense, voluntary and Palpa does not hold a legal monopoly for container deposits systems. Lidl has its own levy system for Lidl bottles. Those beverage containers that do not belong to a container deposit system are levied an excise tax of €0.51/L, regardless of the container size. The tax is so high that essentially all beverage manufacturers and importers opt to join the Palpa system instead of paying the excise tax.

==== Germany ====
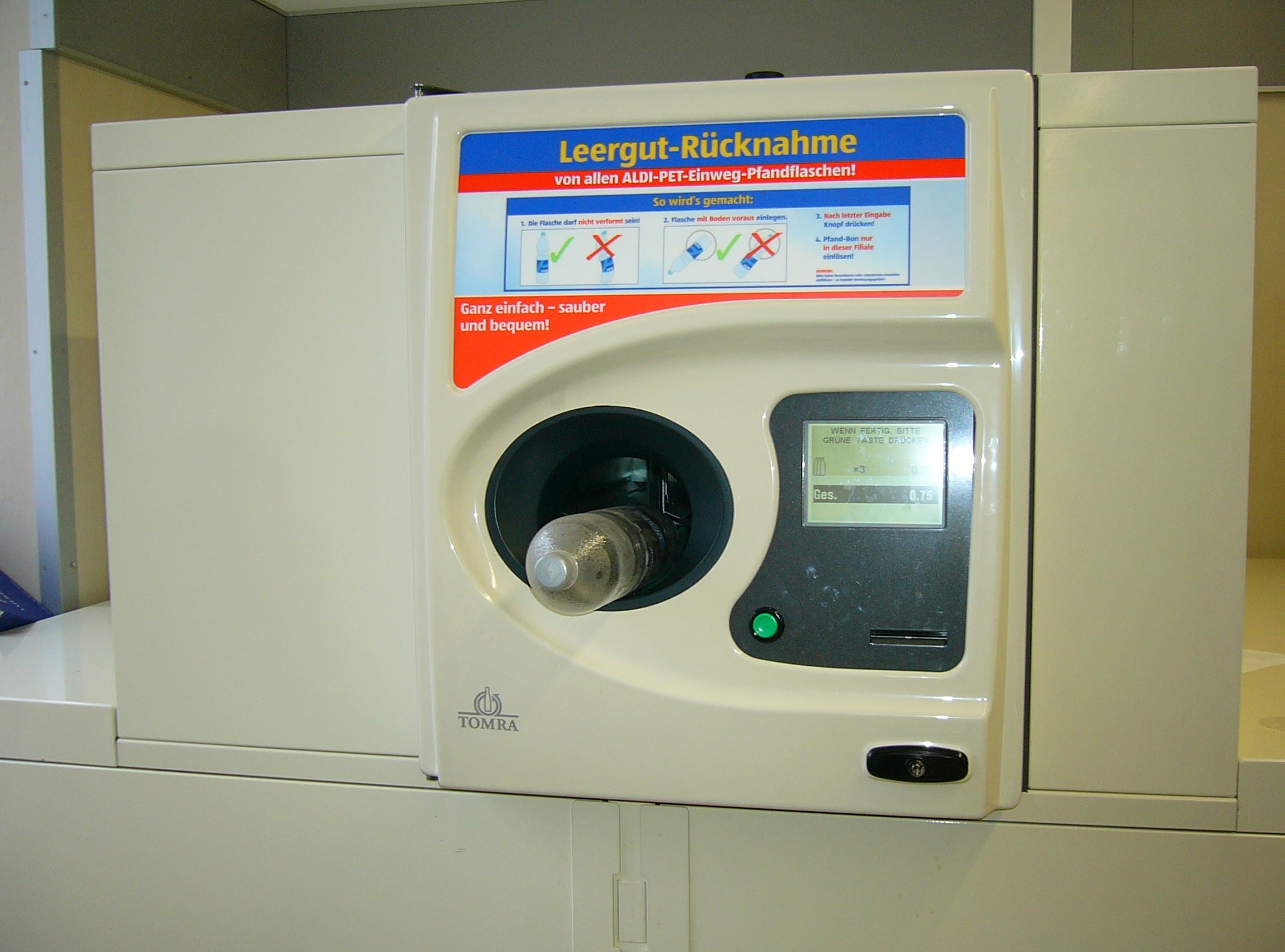
Reverse vending machine in an Aldi supermarket in Germany

In Germany, the deposit legislation covers plastic, aluminium, and glass containers for water, beer, mixed drinks containing beer, carbonated and non-carbonated soft drinks including fruit juices, as well as mixed alcoholic drinks. Excluded from the programme are containers for milk products, wine, spirits, liquors, and certain dietary drinks. Also excluded are containers smaller than 100 mL and larger than 3 L. Germany was noted in 2012 as one of the few countries that included plastic bottles in its schemes.

There is separate legislation (known as Einwegpfand or single use deposit) for non-reusable containers, mostly thin plastic bottles and aluminium cans, distinct from (Mehrwegpfand reusable deposit) for reusable containers, mostly glass and thicker plastic.

Legislation for an Einwegpfand (single use) deposit system was created in 2002 and came into force on 1 January 2003. However, its implementation was fought by lobby groups of German bottling industry and retailers. This fight also included trials at the Federal Administrative Court of Germany and the Federal Constitutional Court of Germany, but all trials were won by the German federal government.

The deposit charge for Einwegpfand containers is required to be relatively high. As of October 2016, the standard deposit for these is €0.25. By comparison, the deposit for reusable containers (mostly glass bottles) is usually between 8 and 15 cents. The usual rates are locally €0.02 for some wine bottles, €0.08 for beer bottles up to 0.5 L, and €0.15 for beer bottles with flip-top closures, beer bottles over 0.5 L and other bottles (mostly water and soft-drinks, lesser fruit drinks, milk, cream, yoghurt). Some bottles have an even higher deposit. Bottle crates have a deposit of €1.50.

The reasoning behind the price discrepancy was to keep environmentally-harmful plastics from ending up as litter or in the regular garbage system. It was also meant to make non-reusable beverage containers more expensive and thus, less attractive.

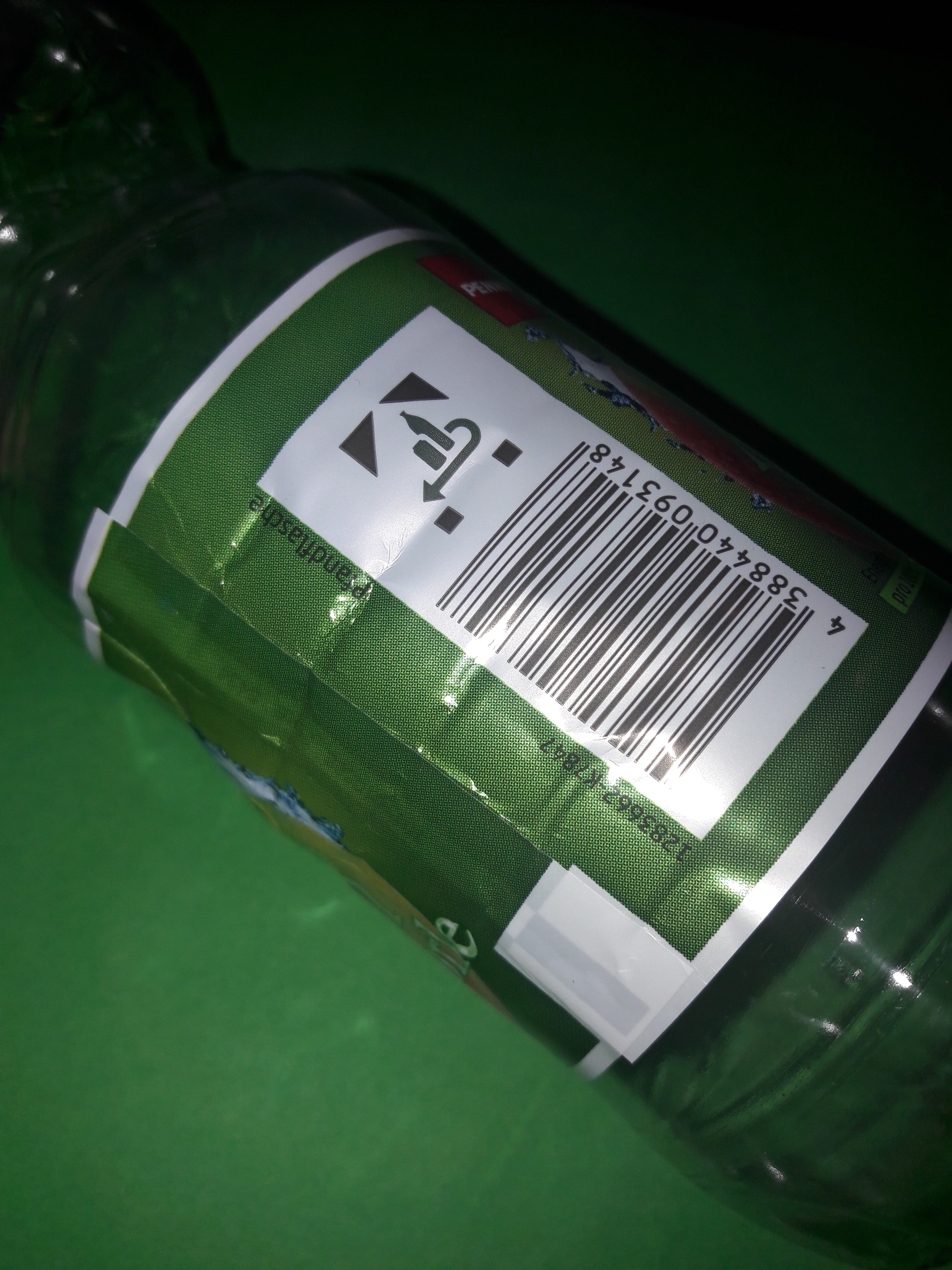
German plastic bottle with an Einwegpfand sign

Retailers are only obliged to take back the material fractions that they sell. The deposit for refillable bottles is not defined by law. Germany's collection system is 80% automated and 20% manual. Most supermarkets in Germany have a reverse vending machine that is designed to be used by customers and which scans "Pfand" returns and prints a receipt for the total value of the refund which can be exchanged for cash or put towards the cost of future purchases.

Supermarkets near the Danish border have established a scheme, where Scandinavian residents are exempt from "Pfand", by signing an "Export declaration" and providing that cans are exported within 24 hours and the contents are not consumed within Germany.

The system has successfully encouraged the recycling of Einwegpfand containers. Between 97 and 99% of non-reusable bottles are returned, and recycling rates for cans are around 99%. On the other hand, the percentage of containers being sold that are reusable has actually decreased from about 80% to below 50% since the system was established. Since manufacturers keep the deposit on any unreturned containers, they are effectively incentivized to produce Einwegpfand containers which yield a higher profit if they are not returned. One estimate suggests they have earned €3bn on unreturned bottles since the system was introduced.

At any given time, an estimated 2 billion beer bottles are in circulation in Germany, each of which sees an average of 36 reuses.

==== Hungary ====
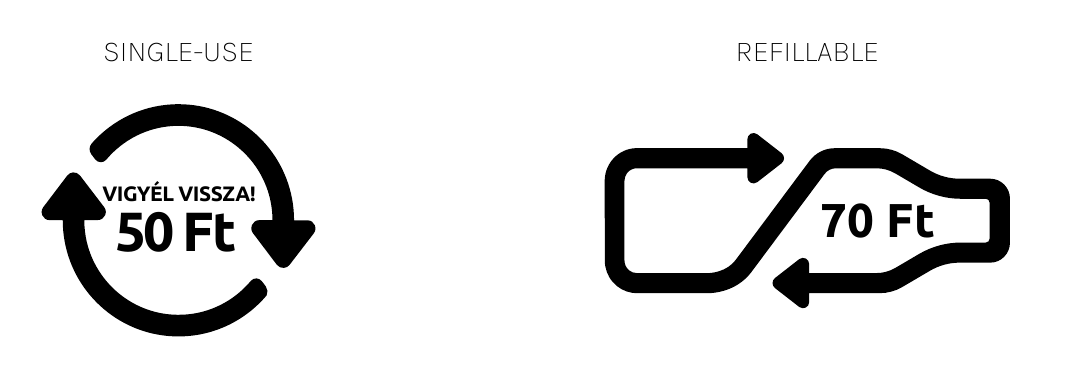
Markings for single-use and refillable containers in Hungary

In Hungary, beer, wine and standardized liquor bottles carry a deposit on them, which has been liberalized — beer bottles had 25 forints on them, but for wine and liquor bottles, the sum was decided by the trader, which people could exploit by buying a drink from one retailer and returning the empty container to the rival who returned a bigger deposit. On January 1, 2024, Hungary introduced a standardized bottle refund system with each single-use bottle and can from 0.1 Liter (apart from milk and milk products) having a 50 Forint (~0.13€) deposit, and bottles/cans are mainly collected by reverse vending machines and must be taken back by every retailer. It is operated by the company MOHU, a subsidiary of the Hungarian oil company MOL.

==== Iceland ====
Iceland has had a deposit system on a national scale for a wide range of containers (plastic, aluminium, and glass) since 1989. All ready-to-drink beverages, wine, and liquor are included in the program. Milk, milk products, and juice extracts are excluded. The deposit is the same for all bottles and cans, ISK 18.

The recycling rate per product is approximately 90% aluminium, 87% PET. Glass is not recycled.

==== Ireland ====
Ireland introduced a Deposit Return Scheme for plastic bottles and aluminium cans on 1 February 2024.

The scheme applies to plastic bottles and aluminium and steel cans between 150mL and 3L. Glass containers and dairy products are excluded.

A deposit of €0.15 applies to containers from 150mL to 500mL inclusive and a deposit of €0.25 for containers over 500mL to 3L inclusive.

All retailers that sell "in scope" beverages are required to be part of the scheme.

==== Lithuania ====
Lithuania implemented container deposit legislation for single-use cans and bottles in February 2016. Lithuania's program is comprehensive and charges a deposit on nearly all types of beverage containers, including those made of plastic, metal, and glass 0.1 l to 3 l. The deposit is applicable to beer and beer cocktails; cider and other fermented beverages; mixed alcoholic and non-alcoholic beverages; all types of water; juice and nectars (sold in glass, plastic, and metal packaging); and fruit wines and wine-product cocktails sold in plastic and metal packaging. Milk, wine, and spirits are exempt. The deposit is the same for all containers and is €0.10 per bottle/can, and most collection is done using reverse vending machines.

Lithuania's deposit return system is operated by Užstato Sistemos Administratorius (USAD). Container return rates for plastic bottles were 34% before the deposit scheme, 74.3% at end of 2016, 91.9% at end of 2017, and 93% in 2018.

==== Netherlands ====
Under the current deposit-return scheme, large polyethylene terephthalate (PET) 1 liter bottles and greater are subject to a €0.25 deposit, but only those for soft drinks and water. All other beverage types, such as medical drinks, wine, spirits, etc., are excluded. The system, which is operated by Stichting Retourverpakkingen NL, is mostly automated collection (89%) with only 11% of returns being done manually. Beer bottles carry a €0.10 deposit, and beer crates €1.50. In 2014, the Netherlands' deposit system recovered 95% of the containers covered by the program.

On 24 April 2020, the State Secretary for Infrastructure and Water Management Stientje van Veldhoven announced that plastic bottles smaller than 1 liter will be subject to a €0.15 deposit, starting on 1 July 2021. While Dutch environmental organisations acclaimed the decision, it is believed that the extensive campaigning activities by athlete and environmentalist Merijn Tinga made the extension of the deposit law happen.

On 3 February 2021, Van Veldhoven furthermore announced that cans too will be subject to a €0.15 deposit, starting on 1 April 2023. Originally it was meant to start on 31 December 2022, but it was postponed due to lobbying of the supermarkets. As of 2026, cans and glass and plastic beverage bottles are included in the scheme.

==== Norway ====
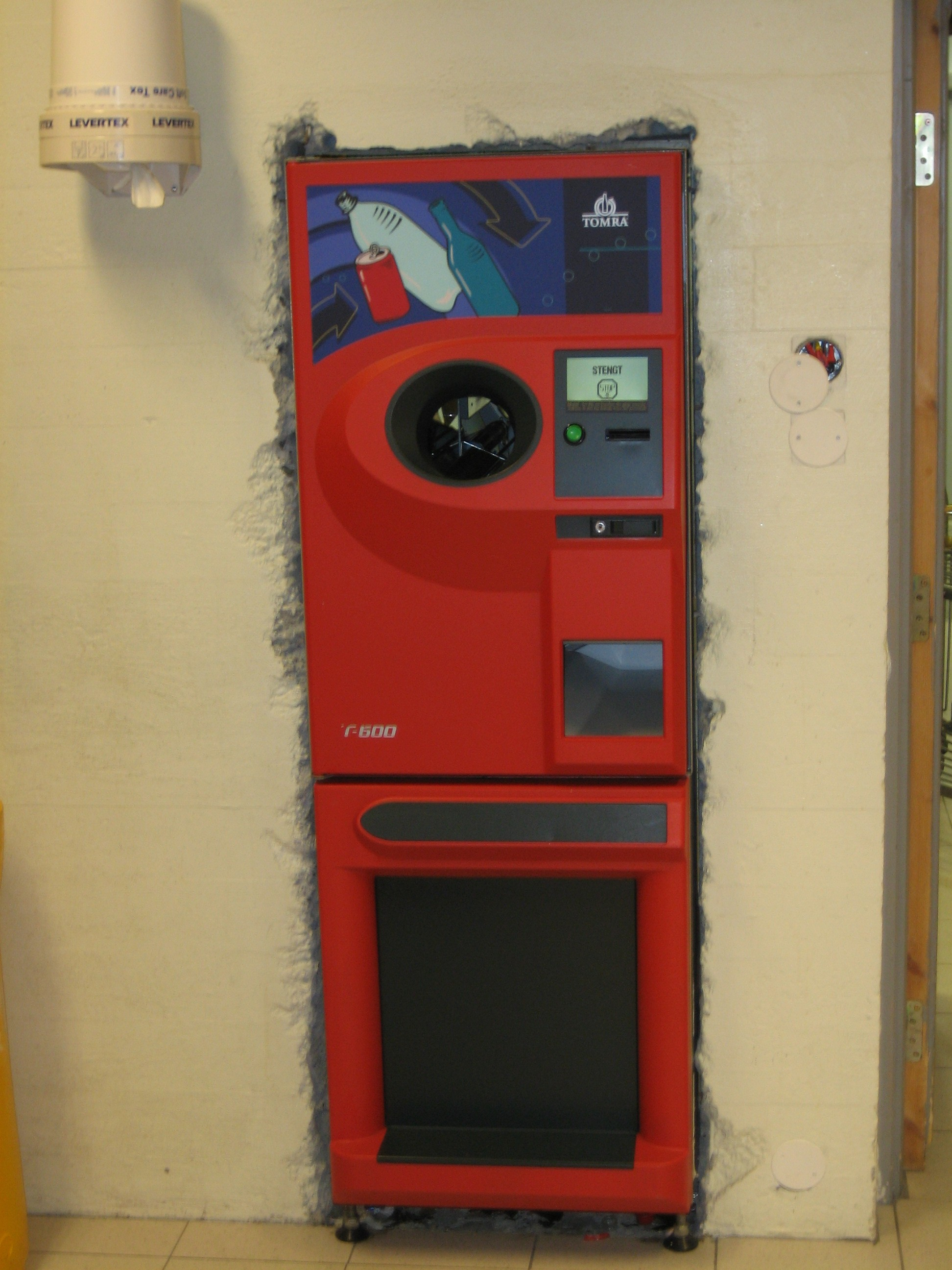
A Tomra reverse vending machine in Hammerfest, Norway

Automated recycling of bottles has been in use since the 1970s. Aluminium and steel beverage cans had a 5,60 kr surtax in Norway up until the end of the 20th century. In 1999, a container deposit legislation was passed, which also abolished this regulation. Today, these are the following container deposits in Norway:

- Cans and plastic bottles up to 0.5 L: 2.00 kroner
- Cans and plastic bottles over 0.5 L: 3 kr
- Bottle crates are also reverse vended.
- As of September 2018 container deposit legislation were removed from glass bottles.

In 2018 the rates were increased to 2 NOK (formerly 1 NOK) and 3 NOK (previously 2.50 NOK) due to inflation and the discontinuation of the 50-øre coin.

Infinitum AS (formerly Norsk Resirk A/S) is responsible for operating the national recycling scheme for non-refillable plastic bottles and beverage cans in Norway. The non-profit corporation was founded in 1999 and is owned by companies and organizations in the beverage industry and food trading.

The Norwegian system works in such a way that the excise tax decreases as the returns increases, meaning for example that 90 per cent returns for cans translates into a 90 per cent discount on the excise tax. This again allows drink products to be sold at lower prices.

In 2014, 95.4% of PET bottles and 96.6% of all drink cans in Norway were returned under the scheme.

Deposits on drink containers have a long history in Norway, starting with deposits on beer bottles in 1902. The deposit back then was 0.06 kr (3.30 kr in 2006 currency value). This deposit arrangement was later expanded to include soft drink bottles.

Up until 1 January 2001, the Vinmonopolet government wine and spirits monopoly chain had deposits on products made by the company itself, this did not include imported products.

All sellers of deposit marked drinking containers are required by law to accept returns of empty containers for cash. As of 2016, drink containers can be returned and deposits retrieved at over 15,000 establishments in Norway. The collection system is 95% automated (using reverse vending machines) and only 5% manual. Most reverse vending machines in Norway are manufactured by Tomra Systems ASA.

==== Portugal ====
In Portugal, fillers must ensure that their return quotas are met, which are 80% for beer, 65% for wine (with certain exceptions) and 30% for soft drinks. Retailers must sell refillable containers for all nonrefillables sold.

==== Spain ====
Spain has a voluntary deposit return scheme that is regulated by three laws:

1. Act 11/1997, 24 April, packaging and packaging waste ("Chapter IV: Deposit, devolution and return system integrated management systems for used packaging and packaging waste")
2. Act 22/2011, 28 July, waste and contaminated soil (Article 31)
3. Royal Decree 293/2018, 18 May, on reducing the consumption of plastic bags

Article 31.2.d of Act 21/2011 of 28 July establishes deposit systems that guarantee the return of the amounts deposited and the return of the product for reuse.

In 2010, the overall return rate was calculated at 87%, while the reuse of beer containers was 57%.

==== Sweden ====
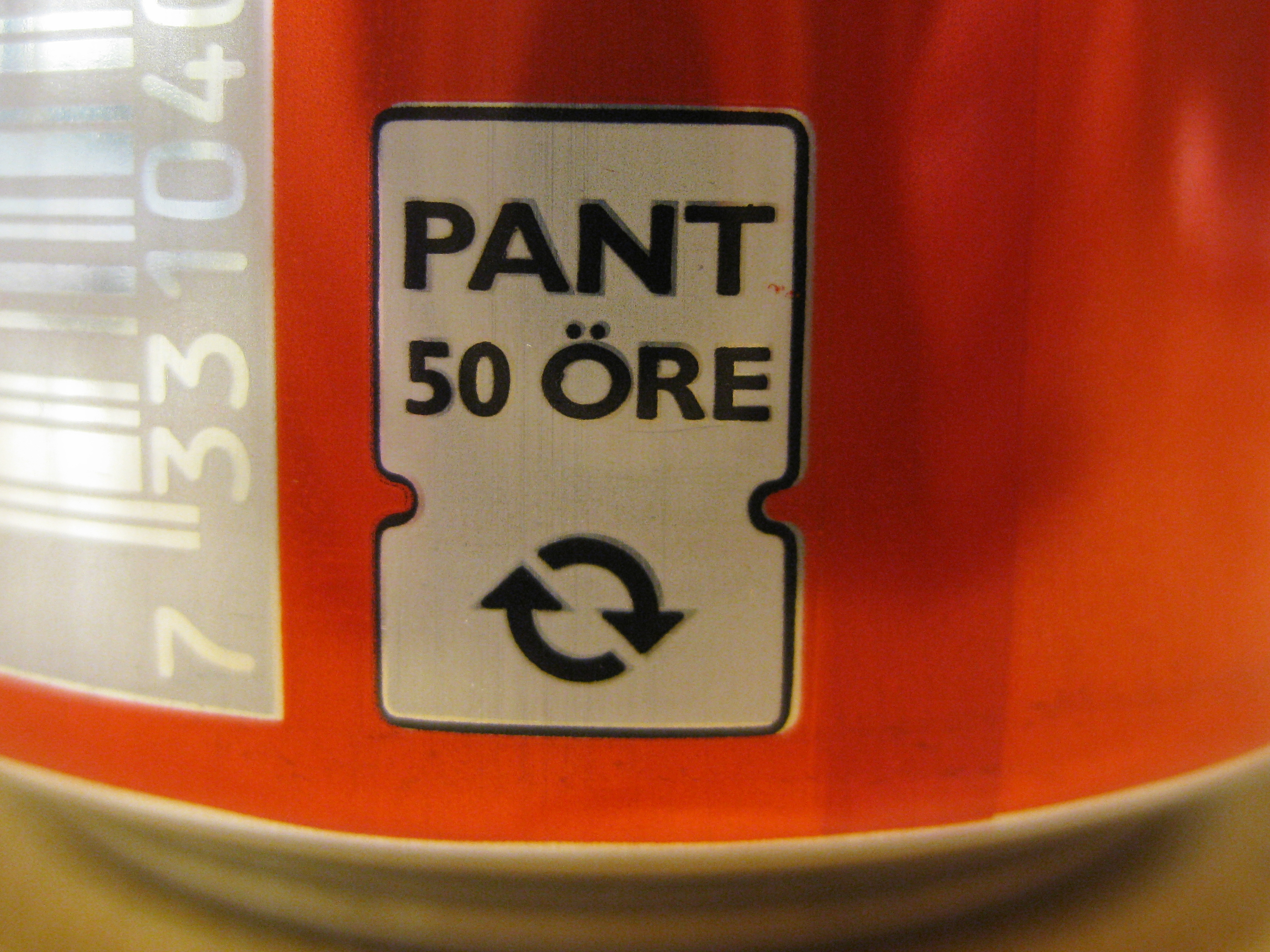
Deposit symbol of the old Swedish 50 öre 33-cl aluminium can

In Sweden, there are deposits on nearly all ready-to-serve beverages, including beer, soft drinks, cider, and bottled water. Since 2015, syrup producers can voluntarily join the deposit system. Since 2017 juice producers are also allowed to join. The deposit values are as follows:

- Metal: SEK 1
- Plastic < 1 l: SEK 1
- Plastic > 1 l: SEK 2
- Glass 33 cl: SEK 0,60, an empty red bottle crate for 20 bottles has a SEK 22,40 deposit.
- Glass 50 cl: SEK 0,90, an empty blue bottle crate for 15 bottles has a SEK 28,00 deposit.

AB Svenska Returpack (Pantamera) is responsible for the deposit system for aluminium cans and PET bottles. The aluminium cans have had a deposit since 1984, and PET bottles since 1994. Svensk GlasÅtervinning AB is responsible for the deposit system of glass bottles. A glass bottle recycling system was introduced in 1884 and the bottles were first standardized in 1885.

Until 1998, all hard alcohol and wine bottles sold at Systembolaget — the government owned alcohol retail monopoly — were sold in standardised reusable bottles with deposit, but due to the deregulation of the Systembolaget's suppliers, the former sole supplier V&S Group dropped the deposit on their bottles due to the restricted bottle shapes giving V&S a disadvantage compared to the competitors. The bottles could be returned and deposit refunded until early 1999 at Systembolaget.

The legislation regarding container deposit systems was updated so that from 1 January 2006, containers from other plastics and metals, e.g., steel cans, can be included in the deposit systems. The law also makes it illegal in Sweden to sell consumption-ready beverages in containers that are not part of an authorized Swedish container deposit system, with the exception of beverages that mainly consist of dairy products or vegetable, fruit, or berry juice. However, private importation from (mainly Eastern European) countries without deposit occurs by vendors that thus compete with a somewhat lower customer price. The recycling of these contraband cans has not been seen as a problem, but Returpack made a campaign in 2010 offering 0.10 krona for each imported can (without deposit) to the benefit of WWF, retrieving 17 million cans. In 2011, a similar campaign was repeated, retrieving almost 18 million cans.

The 1.5 L refillable PET bottle with a deposit of 4.00 kr has been discontinued, and has been replaced by the 1.5 L recycle PET bottle. The last day for returning bottles made by Spendrups for deposit was 30 June 2007, and the last day for bottles made by Coca-Cola Sweden was 30 June 2008.

Although Sweden is one of the leading countries in recycling of beverage containers, Returpack uses TV commercials to promote more recycling. Commercials have been made with well-known melodies sung, like "Guantanamera" and "Pata pata"—sounding like Returpack's slogan "panta mera" (i.e., "recycle more").

In 2016, the overall recycling rate was 84.9% for both aluminium cans and PET bottles, which translates to 177 packages per person in Sweden.

==== Switzerland and Liechtenstein ====
In Switzerland, there is a government ruling that 75% of containers must be returned, otherwise a deposit system may be introduced. Currently a handful of beverages, including milk, sold in glass bottles are done so with a small deposit of 30 or 50 rappen paid by the purchaser, which is returned when the empty bottle is brought back to the store.

According to the Swiss Federal Office for the Environment, The IGORA-Genossenschaft aluminium recycling cooperative levies a prepaid disposal fee on aluminium beverage cans and uses the fees to finance recycling activities.

==== United Kingdom ====
Until the turn of the 21st century, most British bottled beer was sold (whether in off-licences or pubs) in standard quart, pint, half-pint or third-pint (nip) bottles, although some brewers preferred their own distinctive designs. The standard deposit was 7pence (p) for a pint bottle and 5p for a half-pint. However, in the absence of legislation, and given the switch from pub to supermarket sales, and from Imperial to metric measures, the industry has now entirely abandoned refillable bottles.

Beer casks sold for the home or party consumption of draught beer are usually also loaned out against a deposit which may run to several tens of pounds.

In April 2024, Environment Minister, Robbie Moore announced that the UK deposit return scheme would be delayed until October 2027

===== England =====
In England, in January 2017, ministers were reported to be considering a 10p or 20p refundable deposit on plastic bottles and containers after Green Party co-leader Caroline Lucas had voiced her support of such a scheme at the end of 2016. As of February 2017, the idea of a plastic bottle levy was unlikely as the government rejected the deposit scheme proposal. In March 2018, the UK government announced plans to introduce a deposit return scheme in England for drinks containers.

===== Northern Ireland =====
As of June 2015, Northern Ireland had been considering a drinks deposit scheme, following the publication of a feasibility study for a deposit return scheme for drinks containers in Scotland. It has yet to implement such a scheme.

===== Scotland =====
In Scotland, some Barr products in 750 mL glass bottles, had a 30p container deposit although this was discontinued in August 2015. Some Tesco stores have reverse vending machines which pay 1/2p per aluminium can (equivalent value in Tesco Clubcard Points). Furthermore, the landmark Climate Change (Scotland) Act 2009 passed by the Scottish Parliament contains within it powers for Scottish ministers to implement a national scheme. As of April 2017, a Holyrood motion supporting the idea of a small deposit on all drinks containers was signed by 66 MSPs, including member from every party. In May 2015, the Association for the Protection of Rural Scotland (APRS) published Scottish polling which revealed overwhelming support for deposit-return. The figures showed that 78.8% of those who expressed a view supported this approach for Scotland, while just 8.5% opposed it. Several companies, most notably large drinks corporations like Coca-Cola, are known to have lobbied against the introduction of a national deposit scheme. But in February 2017, the drinks company unexpectedly announced its support for a deposit-return program in Scotland, and in a statement to the Independent, Coca-Cola UK stated: "We have embarked on a major review of our sustainable packaging strategy to understand what role we can play in unlocking the full potential of a circular economy in Great Britain." On 5 September 2017, Scotland's First Minister Nicola Sturgeon announced that a deposit return scheme would be implemented as a means to tackle the rising tide of waste. In March 2020 it was announced that the launch date would be delayed to July 2022.

===== Wales =====
As of March 2018 Welsh ministers are working on a plan to introduce a deposit return scheme. In November 2024, the Welsh government announced that its scheme would include glass bottles, in contrast with other schemes in the UK that would be limited to aluminium and PET plastic containers.

== See also ==
- Reverse vending machine
- Waste hierarchy
