= TerraCycle =

American industrial company

- Type: Privately held company
- Industry: Waste management
- Founded: September 2001; 25 years ago
- Founders: Tom Szaky; Jon Beyer
- Headquarters: Trenton, New Jersey, U.S.
- Number of locations: 21 countries
- Key people: Tom Szaky (CEO)
- Products: Goods made from recycled products
- Services: Recycling
- Revenue: ▲$70 million (2023)
- Website: terracycle.com

TerraCycle is a private U.S.-based recycling business headquartered in Trenton, New Jersey. It primarily runs a volunteer-based recycling platform to collect non-recyclable pre-consumer and post-consumer waste on behalf of corporate donors, municipalities, and individuals to turn it into raw material to be used in new products. TerraCycle also manages Loop, a consumer-products shopping service with reusable packaging.

== History ==
TerraCycle was founded by Tom Szaky and Jon Beyer in the fall of 2001. In 2002, the company bought a US$20,000 continuous-flow composting system invented by Harry Windle of Gainesville, Florida, to take organic waste and have it processed by worms into fertilizer. Initial funding came from family and friends of Szaky and Beyer, as well as awards from business plan competitions. Further funding came from private investors. The first investor was Sumant Sinha, who gave $2,000 in exchange for 1% of the company stock.

The dining halls of Princeton University were the first sources of waste used. Instead of pure fertilizer, TerraCycle sold its products in liquid form upon concluding that liquid fertilizer could have better consumer reception. The original rationale for packing its liquid fertilizer in used plastic bottles was because the company could not afford new ones. Later, the company continued this process and marketed their gardening products as "Waste in Waste". Schools and local organizations collected bottles for TerraCycle in exchange for proceeds in what became known as the "Bottle Brigade".

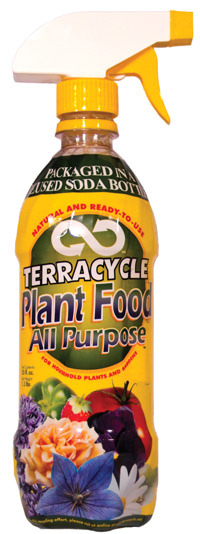
TerraCycle's "plant food" packaged in reused bottles and reject spray bottle tops.

The Coca-Cola Company and PepsiCo both gave TerraCycle a license to use their bottles in TerraCycle products.

In 2004 and 2005, The Home Depot Canada and Wal–Mart Stores Canada began carrying TerraCycle products. During its growth, the company bought an abandoned mansion to house its interns and a warehouse for its fertilizer production and offices. In 2007, TerraCycle developed Brigade and waste collection programs for Honest Tea, Stonyfield Farm, and Kraft Foods. Seth Goldman, founder and CEO of Honest Tea, asked Szaky for a waste program for its Honest Kids brand. As Szaky himself designed sample products for the aluminum-plastic pouches, including pencil pouches and tote bags, Goldman agreed to sponsor the Drink Pouch Brigade. Upon deals with Safeway, Target, and Walgreens to buy the products, TerraCycle acquired approximately 20 million baled juice pouches stored by Encorp in British Columbia, Canada, which contained many Capri-Sun pouches. Kraft granted TerraCycle permission to use Capri-Sun brand pouches in its products, They obtained additional sponsorship for the Drink Pouch Brigade as well. later followed by programs for other Kraft brands.

In 2008, TerraCycle partnered with Target to sell recycled Target plastic shopping bags fused together as reusable bags named "reTotes". At the end of the year, TerraCycle lost $4.5 million. As a result, the company changed its manufacturing processes to use pre-consumer extra and misprinted packaging labels from other companies in its upcycled products. TerraCycle changed to use the majority of its collected post-consumer waste for recycling into plastic molding pellets. Around 2008, it ended its Bottle Brigade program.

TerraCycle launched in the UK in September 2009 as its first market in Europe, and operates in 12 European markets. By 2009, the firm moved away from manufacturing to licensing all of its products. The same year, it outsourced its vermicompost production to worm farmers in North Carolina. In the UK, by 2010 its programmes have diverted over 57 million items of packaging waste from landfill (around the weight of a jumbo jet) while earning over £744,000 for schools, charities and non-profit organisations.

From 2012, the firm and various tobacco companies partnered to launch a widespread collection and recycling system for cigarette butts. The cigarette filters, generally made from cellulose acetate, are refined into pellets that are then used in the production of plastic items such as shipping pallets, benches, and ashtrays. The company promises that the recycled plastic from cigarette filters will only be used in industrial products and not in household plastics, due to exposure to nicotine. Tobacco and paper are composted in this program.

In January 2014, Progressive Waste Solutions announced a 19.99% interest acquisition in TerraCycle Canada to cooperate on recycling initiatives in Canada. In October 2016, TerraCycle and Suez Environment announced that Suez acquired 30% of TerraCycle's European operations to develop collection and recycling programs in Europe. At the World Economic Forum in January 2017, TerraCycle, Procter & Gamble and Suez announced production of the world's first recyclable shampoo bottle made from plastic recovered from beaches, rivers and waterways for the Head & Shoulders brand. The first bottles went on sale in France in June 2017 and in October the project was recognized by the United Nations as a winner of a Momentum For Change Lighthouse Activities Award. In 2019, TerraCycle announced Loop, a closed-loop reusable packaging platform for consumer packaged goods companies. The system ships food, household cleaning, personal care products in a reusable padded container. The products are delivered in reusable containers, which are returned to the Loop tote, picked up by Loop, cleaned, refilled and reused.

== Products and services ==
TerraCycle has created approximately 200 products, all of which are licensed to manufacturers, instead of being manufactured by TerraCycle itself.

It began with the production of fertilizer made from vermicompost, which is produced by feeding organic waste to worms. The worms' excrement was then liquefied into "compost tea" by mixing it with air and warm water in large vats. It was packaged in reused plastic water bottles. The spray bottle tops were rejects from other companies. Residue left over from the vats was used in potting soil and seed starter products.

The company diversified its production into upcycling around 2007 and began creating products from other waste items such as making coin pouches and tablet cases from retired U.S. Postal Service bags. Various products are produced from pre-consumer waste and post-consumer waste, including messenger and tote bags.

Plastic packaging waste, that is not upcycled, is recycled into a raw material that can be used in plastic products, including playgrounds, plastic lumber, plastic pavers, bike racks, park benches, and garbage and recycling cans.

Its recycling programs enable individuals or groups to collect specified waste materials in exchange for donations to a selected cause or school. Users sign up via the firm's website, and shipping and donation costs are generally covered by a sponsoring company related to the specified recycling program. The waste materials, typically non-recyclable, are either refurbished, upcycled, or recycled. Terracycle contracts with third parties for its recycling.

== Corporate affairs ==
=== Headquarters ===
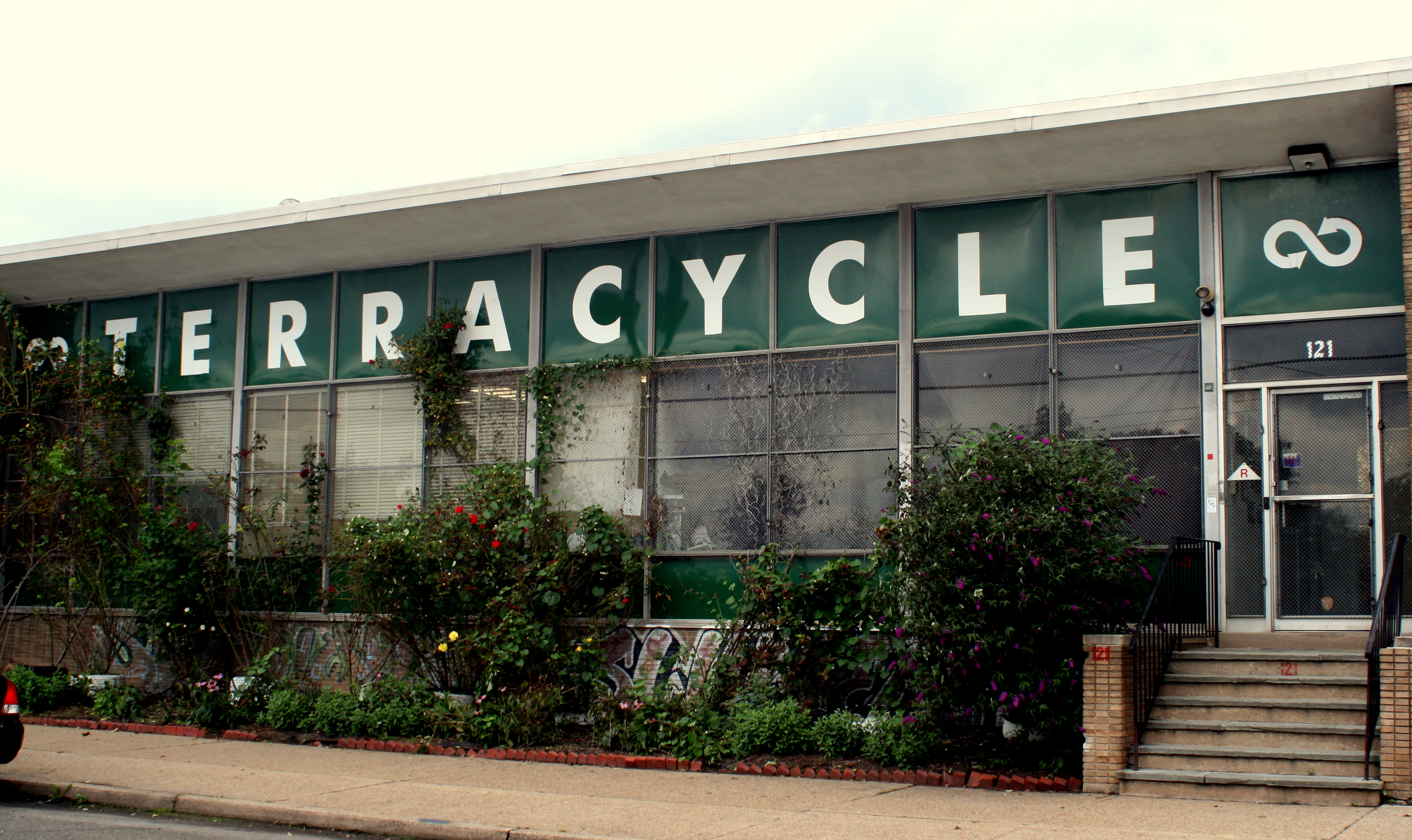
The front of TerraCycle's headquarters.

TerraCycle's main headquarters are located in Trenton, New Jersey. The office was originally a 20,000 square feet (1,900 m^{2}) abandoned warehouse for a newspaper distribution facility. The headquarters were purchased by TerraCycle in the summer of 2004. Its renovations were done by TerraCycle's internal design team, led by employee Tiffany Threadgould, and its walls are painted annually by local graffiti artists at "Graffiti Jams".

=== Marketing ===
The TerraCycle company logo is a green infinity symbol with two arrows pointed toward one another. Szaky designed the logo during a lecture at Princeton. In 2007, Scotts Miracle-Gro Company charged the company with false advertising and trade dress violations in TerraCycle's choice of colors, claiming they were similar to its own products. In response, TerraCycle started a media campaign known as "suedbyscotts.com". Scotts dropped the case after TerraCycle agreed to recolor its packaging to orange and green, and remove pictures of fruits and vegetables on its labels.

TerraCycle was the subject of a National Geographic reality television series named Garbage Moguls. The pilot premiered on Earth Day, April 22, 2009. The show featured the company's team searching for solutions to various waste streams. In 2014, Pivot launched Human Resources, a reality TV series providing a behind-the-scenes look at day-to-day operations at TerraCycle's headquarters. It also partnered with game developer Guerillapps to make a Facebook-based flash game known as Trash Tycoon.

In 2021, TerraCycle agreed to update its labeling after settling a lawsuit accusing it of misleading product labeling. It was alleged that the company did not disclose the limits to the quantity of packaging that would be recycled.
