= Danish Outdoor Council =

- Founded: 1942
- Type: Non-governmental
- Headquarters: Copenhagen, Denmark
- Region served: Denmark
- Key people: Lars Ejsted (CEO); Lars Mortensen (Chairman)
- Website: Official website

The Danish Outdoor Council (Danish: Friluftsrådet) is a non-governmental umbrella organisation for organisations active in the promotion of outdoor, recreational activities as well as nature protection interests in Denmark. It was founded on 27 November 1942 and now has 94 member organisations.

== Organisation ==
The highest authority of the Danish Outdoor Council is the General Assembly where all membership organisations are represented. The daily operation of the Outdoor Council is managed by a Board with 11 members and carried out by a Secretariat. The secretariat is located on Scandiagade in the Sydhavnen area of Copenhagen. It was founded in 1942 and now has 02 members.

== Activities ==
The Danish Outdoor Council manages a number of schemes such as Blue Flag in Denmark, Green Flag, Green School and Green Spouts schemes. The Clover Trails (Kløverstier) network with 10 sign-posted hiking trails throughout Denmark was introduced in 2011. It is host organisation of the Foundation for Environmental Education ( FEE). The Danish Outdoor Council also manages the funds for outdoor, recreational activities through Danske Spil.

=== Nature parks ===
The Danish Outdoor Council runs a certification scheme for "natura parks" (Danish: Naturparker).

Current parks under the scheme are:

- Naturpark Åmosen
- Naturpark Vesterhavet
- Naturoark Amager
- Naturpark Maribosøerne

Pilot projects:

- Naturpark Randers Fjord
- naturpark Lillbælt

== Membership organisations ==
=== A members ===
- 4H
- Biologforbundet
- BL-Danmarks Almene Boliger
- Børne- og Ungdomspædagogernes Landsforbund
- Danhostel Danmarks Vandrerhjem
- Danmarks civile Hundeførerforening
- Danmarks Cykle Union
- Danmarks Fritidssejler Union
- Danmarks Jægerforbund
- Danmarks Kulturarvs Forening
- Danmarks Skiforbund
- Danmarks socialdemokratiske Ungdom
- Danmarks Sportsfiskerforbund
- Danish Cyclists' Federation
- Danish Ornithological Society
- Dansk Amatørfiskerforening
- Dansk Autocamper Forening
- Dansk Automobil Sports Union
- Dansk Faldskærms Union
- Dansk Firmaidrætsforbund
- Dansk Forening for Rosport
- Dansk Friluftsliv – forum for natur og friluftsliv
- Dansk Fritidsfiskerforbund
- Dansk Golf Union
- Dansk Islandshesteforening
- Dansk Kano og Kajak Forbund
- Dansk Kennel Klub
- Dansk Land-Rover Klub
- Dansk Naturist Union
- Dansk Orienterings-Forbund
- Dansk Ride Forbund
- Dansk Sejlunion
- Dansk Surf & Rafting Forbund
- Dansk Svæveflyver Union
- Dansk Ungdoms Fællesråd
- Dansk Vandrelaug
- Dansk Vandski & Wakeboard Forbund
- Danske Baptisters Spejderkorps
- DGI
- Danske Naturister
- Danske Tursejlere
- De grønne pigespejdere
- De Gule Spejdere
- Det Danske Spejderkorps
- DK-CAMP
- Dyrenes Beskyttelse
- Federation of Danish Motorists
- FDF, Frivilligt Drenge- og Pige-Forbund
- Folkeferie.dk
- Geografforbundet
- Haveselskabet
- Havkajakroerne
- KFUM-Spejderne i Danmark
- Kolonihaveforbundet for Danmark
- LandboUngdom
- Landsforbundet DUI-Leg og Virke
- Landsforeningen af Ungdomsskoleledere
- Modelflyvning Danmark
- Miljøbevægelsen NOAH
- National Olympic Committee and Sports Confederation of Denmark
- Natur og Ungdom
- Naturvejlederforeningen i Danmark
- Royal Danish Aero Club
- Sct. Georgs Gilderne i Danmark
- Træskibs Sammenslutningen
- Ungdomsringen
- WWF Verdensnaturfonden

=== B members ===
- Campingrådet
- Copenhagen Zoo
- Dansk Falkejagtklub
- Dansk Retursystem
- Dansk Turismefremme
- Danske Handicaporganisationer
- Danske Skov- og Landskabsingeniører og Have- og Parkingeniører
- Efterskoleforeningen
- Fiskeringen
- Foreningen Lydum Mølle
- Kommunale Park- og Naturforvaltere
- Land of Legends
- Ringkøbing-Skjern Museum
- Sammenslutningen af Danske Småøer
