= Used clothes =

Used clothes or used clothing could refer to:

- Post-consumer waste
- Vintage clothing
