= Tom Szaky =

Hungarian businessman

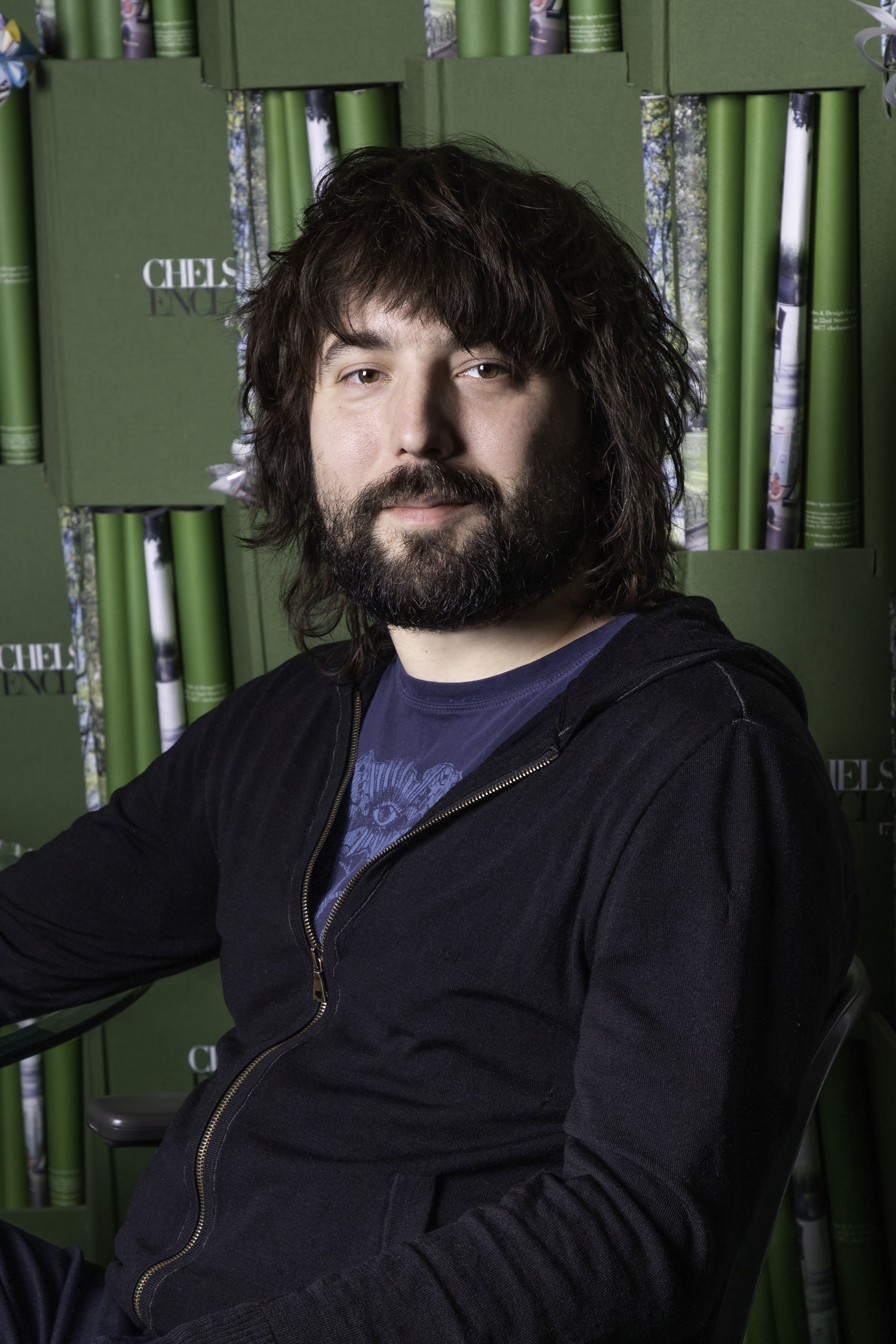
- Born: 14 January 1982 (age 44); Budapest, Hungary
- Occupation: CEO of TerraCycle
- Years active: 2001–present

Tom Szaky (born 14 January 1982) is the CEO and founder of TerraCycle, a private, US-based business headquartered in Trenton, New Jersey that turns non-recyclable pre-consumer and post-consumer waste into raw material to be used in new products.

== Biography ==
=== Early life ===
Szaky's parents are medical doctors, and Szaky is an only child. At age four, Szaky left his home in Hungary after the Chernobyl disaster. In 1987, Szaky immigrated to Canada, where he grew up in Toronto. Szaky attended high school at Upper Canada College. Szaky notes that growing up in Canada and around the strong conservationist movement there is what sparked his interest in environmentalism. According to Szaky, he became fascinated with the concept of recycling after seeing the “astounding” things people threw in the trash, adding that the first television set he ever saw was being thrown in the garbage. This experience proved formative as he credits it with helping him understand that waste was a “modern idea.”

He started to attend college at Princeton University, originally intending to major in psychology and economics. He dropped out during his sophomore year to develop his green recycling business model, known as TerraCycle.

== Career ==
Early on in his career, Tom started three small 'dot.com' companies. These were Werehome.com, Priority.com, and studentmarks.com. Building on his early success, he attended Princeton University where he studied economics and merged his interest in environmentalism and social good with his entrepreneurial studies. Following a road trip to Montreal, Szaky discovered vermicompost and developed a business plan for the Entrepreneurship Club's annual Business Plan Competition that centered around the business model of converting garbage into worm poop fertilizer. Even though he placed fourth in the competition, the seed that would become TerraCycle was planted along with the company's first product in mind. Szaky sits on the board of the World Economic Forum Consumers Beyond Waste initiative.

=== TerraCycle ===
Armed with initial capital funding generated through family, friends and monetary awards earned via additional business plan contests, Szaky purchased a $20,000 continuous flow composting system that converted organic waste from the dining halls of Princeton University into fertilizer through the use of worms. It was at that time TerraCycle's corporate breakthrough came, when Szaky realized that by utilizing discarded plastic bottles as the packaging for the fertilizer, which he engaged schools and local organizations to collect, he could reduce production costs and allow the fertilizer to be marketed as “an entire product made of garbage.” In 2004, the company secured its first high-profile clients with Home Depot Canada and Wal-Mart Canada agreeing to carry TerraCycle products, thereby solidifying the company as a viable business.

In 2006, Tom was named the "#1 CEO under thirty" by Inc. magazine in its July 2006 issue for his work at TerraCycle.

In 2007, TerraCycle pivoted away from organic fertilizer manufacturing and began moving toward developing recycling solutions and collection systems designed to recycle products and packaging that is traditionally not recyclable through standard municipal waste facilities. Once collected, the packaging is cleaned and melted into hard plastic that can be remolded to make new recycled products. Since the company's inception, Szaky and TerraCycle designed the world's first recycling processes for cigarette butts, soiled diapers, and chewing gum. In 2021, The Last Beach Cleanup filed a Green guides claim against TerraCycle and consumer packaged goods companies, with the complaint withdrawn when TerraCycle agreed to pay legal fees.

=== Loop ===
At the 2019 World Economic Forum's annual meeting in Davos, Switzerland, Szaky announced Loop, a global circular shopping platform that utilizes durable containers that can be reused, recycled, or both. In May of the same year, Szaky launched the first trial of Loop in Paris, France. Carrefour, a French multinational retailer and owner of one of the largest hypermarket chains in the world, was announced as Loop's founding retail partner for the Paris trial with plans to make the Loop service available in its brick-and-mortar stores at a future date.

The U.S. pilot program launched in late May in the Mid-Atlantic region of New York, New Jersey, Pennsylvania, Maryland and Washington, D.C., with Kroger Co., the country's largest grocery retailer, and Walgreens, one of the nation's largest pharmacy chains, as Loop's founding retailers in the United States. Due to consumer demand, additional East Coast markets were added just a couple months later. Loop will launch in Canada, Germany, Japan, the United Kingdom and the western U.S. in 2020.

== Publications ==
Tom created, produced and starred in TerraCycle's reality show, Human Resources which aired 3 ten-episode seasons on Pivot from 2014 to 2016.

He has published four books since 2009:

- Revolution in a Bottle (2009, 2013)
  - Szaky's first book chronicles the young CEO's entrepreneurial beginnings featuring the establishment of TerraCycle.
- Outsmart Waste (2014)
  - Szaky's second book focuses on the environmental degradation associated with the prevailing societal response to waste management.
- Make Garbage Great (2014)
  - The CEO's third published work functions as a how-to-guide for an environmentally conscious lifestyle.
- The Future of Packaging: From Linear to Circular (2019)
  - Szaky's fourth book offers a road map out of the modern waste crisis through packaging design with perspective from 15 innovators in sustainability and was named the book “Most Likely to Save the Planet” by the Independent Publisher Book Awards.

== Personal life ==
Tom is married to Avigail Adam and has four children.
