= Pre-consumer recycling =

Pre-consumer recycling is the reclamation of waste materials that were created during the process of manufacturing or delivering goods prior to their delivery to a consumer. Pre-consumer recycled materials can be broken down and remade into similar or different materials, or can be sold "as is" to third-party buyers who then use those materials for consumer products. One of the largest contributing industries to pre-consumer recycling is the textile industry, which recycles fibers, fabrics, trims and unsold "new" garments to third-party buyers.

There are generally two types of recycling: post-consumer and pre-consumer. Post-consumer recycling is the most heavily practiced form of recycling, where the materials being recycled have already passed through to the consumer.

According to the Council for Textile Recycling, each year 750,000 tons of textile waste is recycled (pre- and post-consumer) into new raw materials for the automotive, furniture, mattress, coarse yarn, home furnishings, paper and other industries. Although this amount accounts for 75% of textile waste in the United States, there is little research on textile excess produced in countries that play a larger role in global textile production, such as China, Vietnam, Thailand, India and Bangladesh.

== See also ==
- Looptworks
- TerraCycle
- Upcycling
