= Looptworks =

- Founded: 2009
- Founder: Scott Hamlin; Gary Peck
- Headquarters: Portland, Oregon
- Area served: United States
- Products: bags accessories clothing

Looptworks is a Portland, Oregon business that upcycles or re-purposes abandoned, pre-consumer and post-consumer materials into limited-edition products. By re-using the world's pre-consumer excess, the U.S.-based company aims to "break the cycle of waste". The products created by Looptworks primarily focus on bags, accessories and clothing.

It is estimated that a single garment factory can create up to 60,000 pounds (27 metric tons) of textile waste, which normally goes to landfills. Looptworks intends to use that waste to make new products. "Our intent is to follow the waste stream. We as western society have gone over [to Asia] and asked a lot of people to do favors for us but haven’t considered what the implications are. We have to clean up our mess", according to Scott Hamlin, Looptworks's co-founder. Looptworks intends to call attention to excess and waste, and encourage "thoughtful consumption."

Looptworks's designs will change frequently, as sources of supply vary, making each design effectively a "limited edition", which the company hopes adds to the attraction for some consumers.

Looptworks will have a much quicker design cycle than most apparel makers with an estimated 9 weeks as opposed to 54 weeks.

Looptworks has introduced "laptop sleeves" constructed from a wetsuit factory's scrap neoprene.

According to Ariel Schwartz of Fast Company: "Looptworks isn't the first company to manufacture upcycled goods-but it is the first clothing line to exclusively use textile waste that would otherwise end up in the garbage."

== Sponsorship ==
Looptworks was the official supplier and sponsor of the Cascadia official soccer team during June 2014 - May 2018.

== See also ==
- Upcycling
- Pre consumer
