= Trash Tycoon =

- Logo
- Developer: Guerillapps
- Platform: Adobe Flash
- Release: Facebook; September 6, 2011
- Genre: Social network game
- Mode: Multiplayer

Trash Tycoon was an upcycling social network game developed by Guerillapps in 2011. The game applied traditional social gameplay features with the issues of waste, water, and green. Gameplay included cleaning a town overrun by trash, recycling, and constructing products and decorations out of recycled material. The game shared a number of partnerships with real world companies, including TerraCycle, Carbonfund.org, TreeHugger, and Kraft Foods. Trash Tycoon was shut down on July 29, 2012.

== Gameplay ==
Players collect litter in a city covered in trash and upcycle waste into valuable, environmentally friendly products. The player could create other items such as jewelry, toys and furniture, which they could either keep for themselves or sell for profit. The game's production processes reflect the aims of sponsor and partner TerraCycle, a company that provides solution programs for waste that is typically non-recyclable. The 21 million people who participate in TerraCycle’s recycling programs and Trash Tycoon earn points for every piece of waste they collect and return to a TerraCycle kiosk. These points convert to special bonuses including in-game money, special decorative items, or exclusive badges that allow users to show in-game friends their Greenness habits outside of the game.

== Multiplayer ==
Trash Tycoon allowed players to team up with neighbors in a multiplayer environment to collaborate in real-time and clean up the virtual city. The game also contained a real time chat feature. Additionally, neighbors could help players regain energy and speed up production.
