= Dansk Retursystem =

- Formation: 2000
- Type: GO
- Legal status: Monopoly
- Purpose: Container deposit
- Headquarters: Hedehusene

Dansk Retursystem A/S is a Danish not-for-profit organization that handles the Danish Container deposit system. The company has a monopoly until at least 2020. The company is headquartered in Hedehusene and in 2008 it had a turnover of 842.3 million kroner.

== Overview ==
The company was founded in 2000 by Denmark's breweries in conjunction with the supermarket chains. It is now regulated by the Ministry of Environment. The company is funded by the fee paid by the beverage companies and bottles that are not returned (deposit never collected). The money it makes is used to improve the system.

Danish Returns are owned by the Danish Returns Holding A / S (85.62%), Harboe Brewery (14.27%), Vestfyen (0.10%) and Mineral Water Factory Speed (0.01%). The holding company is owned by Carlsberg Breweries A / S (which is the major shareholder), Royal Unibrew and Thisted Brewery.

== See also ==
- Container deposit legislation
