= Encorp Pacific =

Non-profit organization in British Columbia

- Company type: Non-profit organization
- Founded: 1994; 32 years ago
- Headquarters: Burnaby
- Number of locations: 170 (2018)
- Area served: British Columbia
- Key people: Allen Langdon (Director)
- Revenue: $94,617,619 (2018)
- Website: www.return-it.ca

Encorp Pacific (commonly known as Return-It) is a non-profit organization which manages the recycling of beverage containers and electronic devices in British Columbia. Encorp Pacific was initially founded in 1994 to collect non-alcoholic beverage containers with refundable deposits. In 2001, Encorp Pacific signed a deal with the Liquor Distribution Branch to also collect all alcoholic beverage containers. In 2006, the organization also began collecting milk containers (which are now collected by Recycle BC) and electronic devices for recycling. In February 2019, a pilot program began, allowing the collection of textile waste at some locations.

== Recycling depots ==
170 return locations operate throughout the province under the Return-It name, although most locations are privately owned. Many of these depots also have partnership with other product stewardship groups, such as Product Care and Call2Recycle to collect additional recyclable materials.

In December 2013, the first Express kiosk was opened inside of a Return-It depot in Burnaby. The system allows users to register online, bag their refundables in clear plastic bags and print labels for the bags at the depot. The bottles are then counted by depot staff and money is placed into the user's account. The first stand-alone Return-It Express location opened in Yaletown. In October 2019, Return-It placed a converted shipping container in Tofino as the first "Express & Go" location, designed for small communities without a depot.

== Beverage container deposits ==
Encorp Pacific collects refundable deposits and container recycling fees on most ready-to-drink beverage containers in British Columbia, regardless of material type. Beer container deposits are managed directly by their distributor; however, they are still accepted at Return-It depots. Milk containers have never been deposit-bearing in the province. As of November 1, 2019, the deposit on non-alcoholic beverage containers 1L or smaller was doubled from 5¢ to 10¢.

=== Return rates ===
As of 2019, Encorp Pacific had a government-mandated recovery rate of 75%, expressed in the Environmental Management Act.

| Year | Containers sold | Containers returned | Return rate |
|---|---|---|---|
| 2008 | 1,379,887,232 | 1,064,064,122 | 77.1% |
| 2009 | 1,353,133,342 | 1,072,598,298 | 79.3% |
| 2010 | 1,277,506,339 | 1,027,105,322 | 80.4% |
| 2011 | 1,237,182,406 | 987,186,525 | 79.8% |
| 2012 | 1,237,108,765 | 973,327,078 | 78.7% |
| 2013 | 1,214,144,300 | 972,397,241 | 80.1% |
| 2014 | 1,224,579,061 | 968,583,632 | 79.1% |
| 2015 | 1,266,027,839 | 999,290,454 | 78.9% |
| 2016 | 1,282,922,473 | 1,000,749,811 | 78.0% |
| 2017 | 1,349,149,437 | 1,023,306,039 | 75.8% |
| 2018 | 1,350,852,403 | 1,045,466,471 | 77.4% |

== Recycling bins ==
160 street-side bins are located in the City of Vancouver for refundables, as of 2013. Encorp Pacific has also placed bins for refundables inside of large venues across British Columbia.
