= Merijn Tinga =

Dutch environmental activist

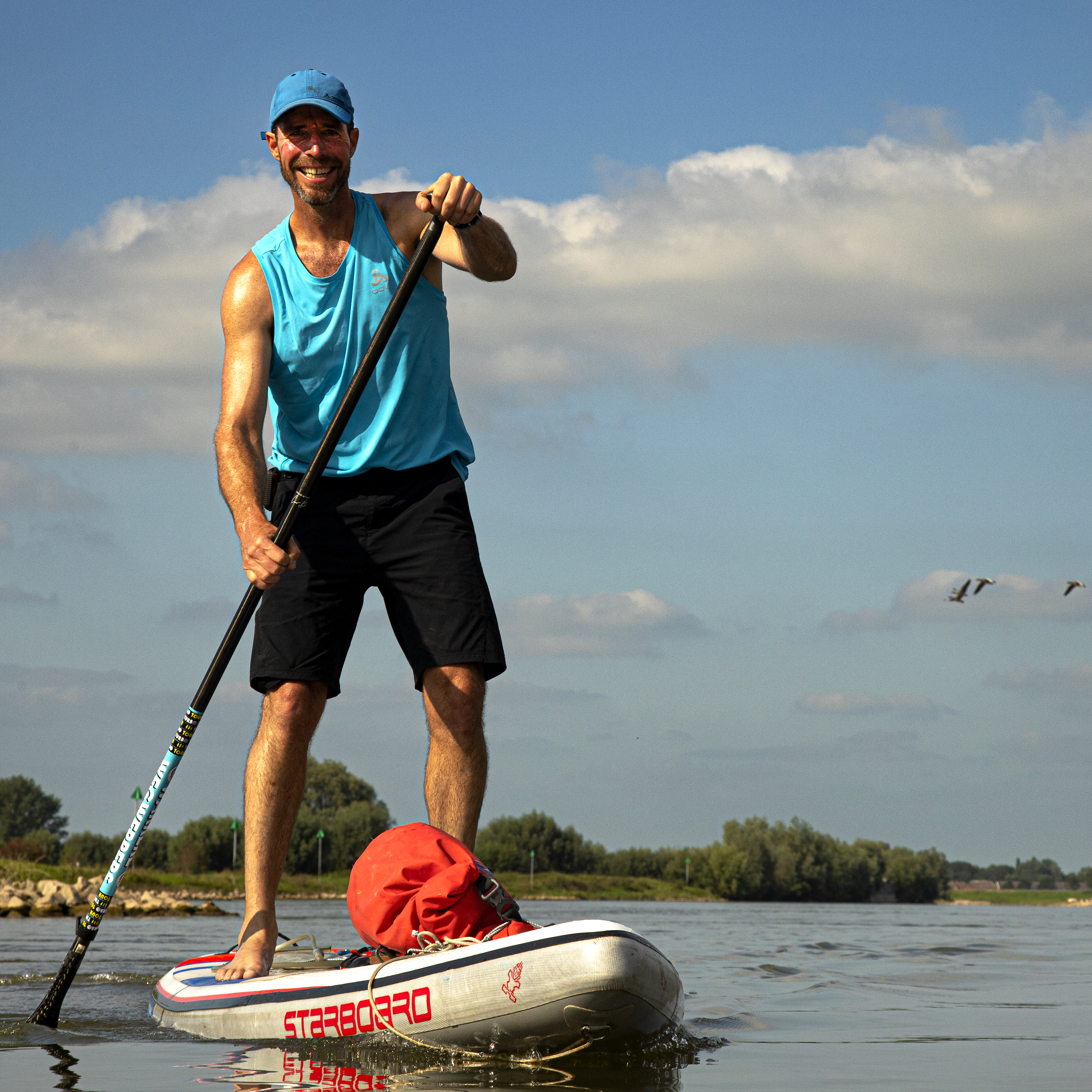
Merijn Tinga on his sup tour 2021 campaigning for waste separation at schools

Merijn Tinga (Leeuwarden, the Netherlands, 1972) is a Dutch environmental activist. As the Plastic Soup Surfer he campaigned for reducing plastic pollution and the plastic soup.

Tinga used different campaign methods: kiteboarding and standup paddleboarding expeditions to raise awareness of the plastic soup problem, a motion for the Dutch House of Representatives that was adopted by the Dutch Government, judicial notices handed over by bailiffs to CEO's of companies whose products cause plastic pollution, collecting photos of littered products and holding companies accountable for this, a lawsuit and covenants. In 2023 he surfed from Norway to Uk and in 2024 from UK to France to draw attention to the issue of marine littering and specifically plastic beverage containers. He was named one of the 50 most interesting athletes of the year 2023. Tinga was member of the "Statigeldalliantie". The campaign for deposits was successful: the Dutch government introduced deposits on cans and plastic bottles.

== Biography ==
=== Plastic Soup Surfer ===
Merijn Tinga studied biology, worked as a biology teacher and became a visual artist. Since 2014 he combined art and activism and campaigned against the plastic soup under the name of the Plastic Soup Surfer. Tinga carried out several expeditions. In 2014, he kiteboarded 350 km along the Dutch and Belgian coast on a kiteboard made of plastic litter he had found on the beaches, to raise awareness of the plastic soup problem. In the summer of 2015, he collected floating plastic as he sailed along the coast of Scandinavia. During this expedition, Tinga concluded that only cleaning up plastic litter will not solve this problem.

=== Campaign for the introduction of deposit fees for small plastic bottles ===
In the period 2016–2020, Tinga campaigned for the introduction of deposit fees on small plastic bottles in the Netherlands. In 2016 he kitesurfed from Scheveningen, the Netherlands, across the North Sea to Lowestoft, England on a foilboard made of plastic littered bottles. With this trip, he drew attention to a petition for a deposit fee on small plastic bottles. In 2017, Tinga presented a petition motion that called for 90% less plastic littered bottles within three years, together with 57.000 collected signatures, in the Dutch House of Representatives. The petition motion was adopted by the Dutch Government. A deposit fee on small plastic bottles has been introduced in the Netherlands as of July 2021.

==== Bailiff and judicial notice ====
In 2017, Tinga developed a new strategy: using a bailiff with a judicial notice. This legal instrument is a 'declaration of awareness' by which companies are formally informed of the pollution, dangers and consequences of the litter as a result of their products or packaging. From the moment that a judicial notice is handed over to the CEO, a company is no longer able to claim to be unaware of these facts.

Tinga used this strategy after a 1200 km standup paddle tour down the Rhine, From Source to Sea, on a standup paddleboard made of littered bottles. This way he managed to meet with the CEO's of soft drink manufacturers and Dutch retail companies that tried to block the introduction of deposits on small plastic bottles.

=== Campaigns against products causing plastic pollution ===
In 2018, Tinga and Dirk Groot (who, by the name of the Zwerfinator, campaigns against litter), started collecting photos of plastic litter as evidence of the pollution and approaching the manufacturing and retail companies together with a bailiff and a judicial notice to ask them to come up with solutions.

In 2018, Groot and Tinga approached the CEO of Pervasco, the producer of Anta Flu throat lozenges, after collecting 16.000 photo's of littered Anta Flu wrappers. As a result, Pervasco switched to biodegradable paper wrappers in 2020.

In 2019/2020, Tinga and Groot collected thousands of photo's of littered plastic shards of crackling balls, light fireworks, and plastic splash water balloons. Soon after preparing a lawsuit against the Dutch retailers of crackling balls, most retailers stopped selling this product. By signing the Crackling Ball Covenant, most Dutch retail companies pledged to stop the sale of all fireworks containing plastics. In 2020, Tinga and Groot convinced most retail companies to sign the Splash Plastic Covenant by which they pledged to stop selling plastic splash water balloons and plastic confetti.

=== The Plastic Avengers Manifest ===
In 2019, Tinga organised a conference for Dutch actors in the field of plastic. They drafted the Plastic Avengers Manifest, a framework for a new way of dealing with plastic. Vice-president of the European Commission, Mr. Frans Timmermans, became the official ambassador of this Manifest.

=== Campaigning for DRS in London ===
In July 2023 Merijn Tinga surfed on Thamse river in London in support of the UK initiative for legislation in regard to deposit return scheme for beverage containers. In this unusual track, Tinga using windsurfing board, bearing back discarded plastic bottles traced to their origin in Sweden.

He then spent five weeks to surf between Oslo and London, calling for the British government to establish a nationwide deposit return scheme. He also brought a petition with many signatures to environment minister Rebecca Pow encouraging the conservative politician to take action on the legislation for DRS in the UK.

As a result of his expedition and in addition to meeting ministers and politicians, Tinga even met representatives from Coca-Cola in Westminster and he was invited to follow-up DRS discussions in September 2023. The UK government later in 2024 announced that they will pursure a deposit return scheme for beverage containers.

His surfing for the cause of plastic recycling promotion was significantly covered by the local media, including BBC night news

=== Campaigning for DRS in France ===
In 2024, he did a 850 km expedition of surfing from London to Paris. he successfully surfed from London to Paris in three weeks to draw attention to the littering of plastic in the sea, a similar campaign to what he already performed for the UK.

== Bibliography ==
- Merijn Tinga, Plastic Soup Surfer. Hoe één persoon verschil kan maken. Uitg. Hollandia 2021. ISBN 978-90-6410-725-2
- Merijn Tinga, Tegen de stroom in. Bot Uitgevers 2025. ISBN 9789083483658

== Filmography ==
Eelke Dekker: Message on a bottle (2016). About Tinga's North Sea crossing on a kite foil.

Eelke Dekker: From Source to Sea (2018). About Tinga's SUP tour down the river Rhine. The film was broadcast by National Geographic.

Eelke Dekker: Plastic Paradox (2019). Documentary about the 2017 Rhine SUP tour and the Plastic Avengers Conference, broadcast by National Geographic.

== Subsequent campaigns ==
From 2022 onwards, Tinga continued his collaboration with litter researcher Dirk Groot. Their research and observations on beverage containers and packaging litter in public spaces were referenced several times in debates in the Dutch House of Representatives. In 2022, their findings on beverage cartons were discussed during a parliamentary committee debate.

In 2023, State Secretary Vivianne Heijnen stated that a joint report by the Zwerfinator and Plastic Soup Surfer provided practical recommendations for managing packaging litter and public waste bins. She agreed to discuss their proposals with the Afvalfonds and other stakeholders and to report back to the House of Representatives.

== European deposit return campaign ==
Beginning in 2023, Tinga undertook a multi-year windsurfing and paddleboarding expedition across Europe to raise awareness of deposit return schemes and plastic litter. The journey consisted of four stages, following a route from Oslo via London, Paris and Nice to Rome. During the expedition, he met with government officials and politicians to discuss the introduction and expansion of deposit return schemes.

In May 2026, Tinga completed the fourth and final stage, travelling approximately 750 kilometres from Nice to Rome. At the Vatican, he met Pope Leo XIV and discussed deposit return schemes and plastic pollution with him. Tinga asked the pope to accept a reverse vending machine. According to Tinga, the pope responded that he would have the proposal referred for consideration. A few days later, Tinga reported that representatives of Vatican City had contacted him to discuss deposit return schemes further.

== See also ==
- BBC coverage of the London expedition on youtube
- Introduction article for Tinga in the 50 most interesting athlete, 2023
