= Post-consumer waste =

Trash or garbage discarded by the end-consumers of products

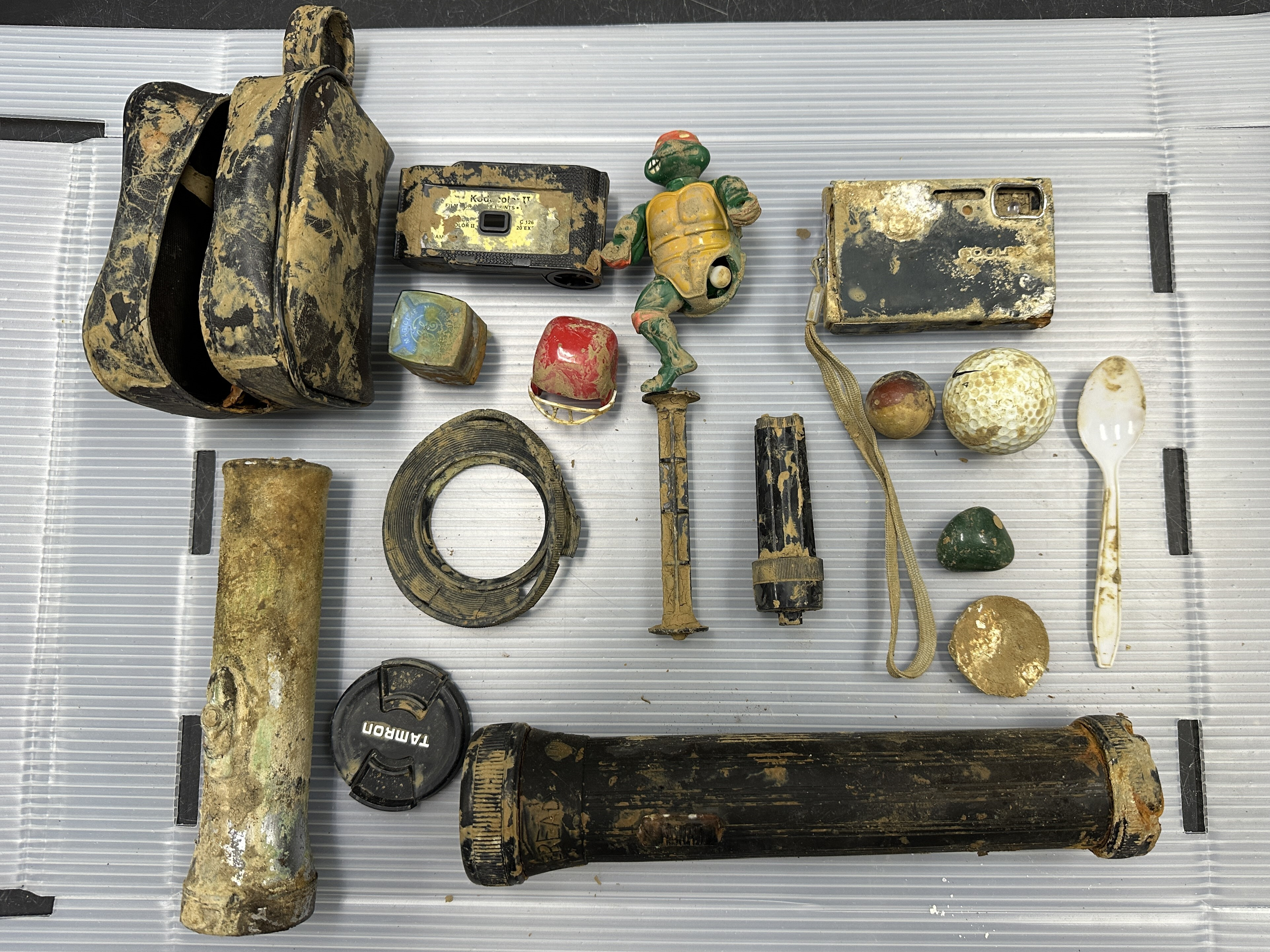
Discarded items found in a lake at Mammoth Cave National Park.

Post-consumer waste is a waste type produced by the end consumer of a material stream; that is, where the waste-producing use did not involve the production of another product. It is the garbage that individuals routinely discard in a waste receptacle or a dump, or by littering, incinerating, pouring down the drain, or washing into the gutter.

Post-consumer waste is distinguished from pre-consumer waste, which is the reintroduction of manufacturing scrap (such as trimmings from paper production, defective aluminum cans, etc.) back into the manufacturing process. Pre-consumer waste is commonly used in manufacturing industries, and is often not considered recycling in the traditional sense. Post-consumer material is post-consumer waste that is diverted from landfills and reprocessed into new material to reenter the production cycle.

Post-consumer waste is associated with a cradle to grave or linear cycle of production. In this system goods are created using standards of what is the easiest and most cost effective, instead of using standards focused on creating recyclable and reusable materials. Instead of being sent back to the industrial sector to be repurposed into new products, the material is sent to the “grave” or landfills/open dumps.

== Types ==
Post-consumer waste includes:

- packaging
- parts that are not needed, such as fruit skins, bones in meat, etc.
- undesired things received, e.g.:
  - advertising material in the mailbox
  - a flyer received in the street without having the opportunity to refuse
  - dust, weeds, fallen leaves, etc.
- things one no longer needs, e.g. a magazine that has been read, things replaced by new versions, clothes out of fashion, remaining food that one cannot keep or does not want to keep
- broken things, things no longer working, spoiled food, worn-out clothes, clothes which no longer fit
- outgrown items, toys, clothing, books, schoolwork
- disposables such as tissues and finished batteries
- human waste, waste of pets, waste water from various forms of cleaning
- leftover materials from single use commodities
  - plastic grocery bags
  - plastic water bottles
  - cardboard boxes
- "post-life waste"
  - one's body or ashes
  - things people do not want and cannot sell
  - broken/unused cars
  - items that cannot be used

== Legal issues ==
In many countries, such as the United States, there is no reasonable expectation of privacy in post-consumer waste once it leaves the consumer's home. Anyone can search it, including the police, and any incriminating evidence recovered can be used at trial. This doctrine was established in The California v. Greenwood case, in which the U.S. Supreme Court held that there is no common law expectation of privacy for discarded materials. This has since led people to argue the legality of taking post-consumer waste for salvage value.

There has also been controversy over the fact that these laws have caused many arrests for the use of illicit substances. After California v. Greenwood there were many cases of individuals having been convicted on evidence that was found in the trash of growing or processing illegal substances, most often marijuana. The post-consumer waste in question varies from drug paraphernalia to full marijuana plants in some cases. This has caused some to wonder about who holds the legal responsibility towards and ownership of post-consumer waste.

According to the decision of California v. Greenwood, the consumer relinquishes ownership and responsibility of their refuse. The verdict of this was intended to address cases like those mentioned above. But it also brings up questions of whether or not people are responsible for their own post consumer waste and the damage that it causes. There have been several cases in the wake of Greenwood questioning this very thing, such as if it is legal for third parties other than trash collectors to lay claim to someone's refuse or if someone is responsible for hazardous post-consumer waste they disposed of once it enters public landfills.

== Excessive waste ==
Especially within the food system, there is a lot of food loss and waste occurring at the consumer end. Post-consumer waste accounts for a large proportion of food that is wasted. This can be attributed to many reasons, including the way in which food is labeled. According to a study published in 2020, the confusing labeling of "use by", "consume by", or "sell by" dates is a significant reason why food is wasted at such a high volume when the food is otherwise entirely edible. Another reason is the way that food is used once it reaches the average consumer household due to many factors, with the main factors being social, behavioral, and personal purchasing habits. Additionally, each of those factors influences each other and affects the amount of food that is wasted per person.

Food waste from production to land use changes adds to the worldwide carbon footprint with the amount between 2000 and 3600 kg CO_{2} equivalent. The focus should be on prevention from within households as each generation are massively increasing their food waste. Multiple studies have shown that the greenhouse gases caused by our food waste at times can be more harmful to the environment than coal power plants.

This is part of a longstanding belief that manufacturers are responsible for the prevalence of post-consumer waste. Many people accused manufacturers for being responsible for its prevalence due to the many materials not being made with recycling or reuse in mind. Additionally, products often have excessive packaging serving no real purpose other than being useful for marketing.

In recent years there has been increased regulation regarding the subject, such as in the EU where new regulations are being passed in order to support more sustainable packaging use and create a cradle-to-cradle material flow. The Food and Agricultural Organization (FAO) discovered that 1/3 of all made food is wasted each year adding up to about 1.3 billion tons of food that was edible.

== Avoiding post-consumer waste ==
As previously mentioned, current systems of consumer waste use a cradle-to-grave or linear model of waste management. This is a model of the lifecycle of a product that results in the product reentering the supply chain instead of being disposed of. This system allows for greater reduction of waste as a large section of the waste produced would be able to enter the supply chain.

There are many ways for individuals to participate in the process of reducing post consumer waste, especially in communities where local governments encourage processes that reduce post consumer waste and promote the cradle-to-cradle structure. The most productive activities to do this are to reuse materials that a person already owns instead of disposing of them, learning methods of repairing and repurposing materials that no longer function, and when buying items is necessary buying those items that will not break or lose functionality after a small number of uses.

This process is often quite difficult as products are often not designed to be reused. This has led to many individuals blaming the producers of these products for the excess amounts of post-consumer waste. This accusation has been held against manufacturers for many years, claiming that retailers incentivized short term profits over the long term safety of the environment. One study shows how as far back as the 1990s, many large scale retailers were claiming to understand their responsibility to waste management, but offered no policies or initiatives to cut back on the amount of waste that is inevitably produced by the consumer.

To combat this, some governments and private institutions have attempted to find new ways of avoiding excessive post-consumer waste. In the European Union, one project is being developed which uses enzymes to dissolve plastic and cardboard waste into basic materials that can be remade into new products for consumer use. In the United States there are organizations such as the Vermont Journal of Environmental Law which holds an annual conference to discuss how best to combat the excessive post consumer waste issue in the United States. Strategies like this allow for greater control over the issue of post consumer waste without changing the supply chain as a whole.

== See also ==
- Household hazardous waste
- Municipal solid waste
