= Capri-Sun =

Brand of juice pouches

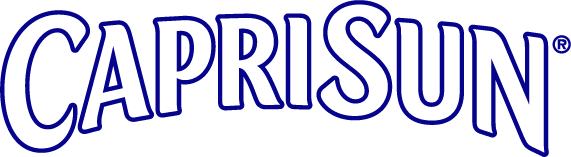
- Primary logo Logo used by Kraft
- Type: Juice concentrate drink
- Manufacturer: Capri Sun Group (Wild), (Note: Capri Sun GmbH, Capri Sun AG, and Capri Sun Group Holding AG are the Wild subsidiaries based in Germany and Switzerland; Capri Sun Inc. is the Kraft subsidiary based in the United States. While the Wild subsidiaries are sometimes metonymically called "Capri-Sun", their official names do not contain hyphens. Capri Sun GmbH, not Capri Sun Inc., owns the Capri Sun trademarks in the United States. Where this article uses "Capri-Sun" unqualified to refer to a corporate entity, it is about the Wild subsidiaries.) with regional licensees including Kraft
- Origin: Germany
- Introduced: 22 June 1969; 57 years ago (as Capri-Sonne)
- Website: capri-sun.com/group/en/

Capri-Sun (UK: /ˈkæpri/ KAP-ree, US: /kəˈpriː/ kə-PREE) is a brand of juice concentrate–based drinks manufactured by the German company Wild and regional licensees. Rudolf Wild invented the drink in 1969 and introduced it in West Germany as Capri-Sonne (a name retired in favor of the English name in 2017). It has come to be sold in over 100 countries, with licensees including Kraft Foods in the United States (as Capri Sun) (Note: This article uses whichever name is applicable in the time and place being discussed. When a time or place would span multiple names, it defaults to the most international name (usually Capri-Sun, in early years Capri-Sonne).) and Coca-Cola Europacific Partners in parts of Europe. (Note: As of March 2024, Capri Sun Group is in the process of taking over all markets previously licensed to Coca-Cola Europacific Partners. The exact cut-over dates vary by country.) It is one of the most popular juice brands in the world; as of 2023, roughly 6 billion pouches are sold per year globally.

Since its launch, Capri-Sun has been packaged in laminated foil vacuum Doy-N-Pack pouches, with which the brand has become strongly associated. In the United States, these pouches predated the advent of Tetra Brik, in an era when fruit juice was usually sold in large containers. The pouch design has stayed largely the same, but changes in some markets have included transparent bottoms and paper straws, while other container types have been introduced for some products. Capri-Sun is available in varying ranges of flavors in different countries, targeting different national flavor profiles. Globally, its best-known flavor is Orange.

Capri-Sun's main products are high in sugar content, although lower than many competitors. Characterizations of the juice drinks as "all-natural" have led to conflict in several countries between consumer advocates who highlight the high sugar content and low juice percentage and Capri-Sun and its licensees, who have generally maintained that the term correctly describes the ingredients. Disputes over sugar content and "all-natural" status have led to two lawsuits in the United States and the removal of the brand's main line from Tesco shelves in the United Kingdom.

In France, Capri-Sun has figured prominently in rap songs and has been noted as a drink of choice in poor areas. Capri-Sun is often marketed to children, which has earned it a negative award from the consumer advocacy group Foodwatch. In the United States, Kraft and its former parent company, the tobacco conglomerate Philip Morris Cos. (now Altria), have successfully marketed Capri Sun using strategies developed for selling cigarettes to children. American parents often misidentify Capri Sun as healthy, and it is one of the most favorably rated brands among Generation Z Americans.

== Brand history ==
=== Origins and global overview ===
Rudolf Wild

Rudolf Wild founded Rudolf Wild & Co. (better known as Wild) in Heidelberg, Germany, in 1931. After World War II, Rudolf Wild created Libella, which, according to Rudolf's son Hans-Peter Wild, was Germany's first branded beverage with a fruit-juice base. Libella was successful, and Wild pursued several other ventures, including Capri-Sonne, which was developed in the 1960s. Restrictions on color additives at the time in West Germany led to less visually appealing soft drinks, incentivizing opaque packaging. Rudolf Wild & Co. engaged with Thimonnier, a French company that primarily manufactured sewing machines, for rights to use their patented pouch design and pouch-making machines. According to Hans-Peter, Rudolf Wild & Co., they did not obtain exclusive rights to Thimonnier's patents but bought all of their machines to make the pouches. After initial issues with spoilage and stains were resolved, the product debuted in West Germany in 1969. The name references the Italian island of Capri, a fashionable yet affordable vacation destination for Germans of the 1960s. Capri inspired many other product names around the same time and place, such as the Ford Capri, Capri pants, and Langnese Capri ice cream; it was branding that appealed to, and represented, bourgeois indulgence.

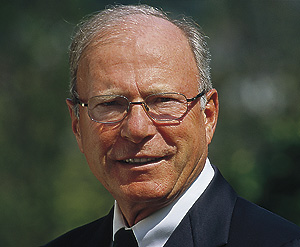
Hans-Peter Wild

At the initiative of Hans-Peter Wild, champion boxer Muhammad Ali began promoting the brand in 1978. SiSi-Werke, the Wild subsidiary responsible for Capri-Sonne, said that the deal included one product crate a week for four years. The endorsement—in which Ali said Capri-Sonne was, like him, "the greatest of all time"—led to a significant increase in sales. By 1982, Capri-Sun was sold in 23 countries, in 19 of which it was the most popular fruit juice. Availability rose to 52 countries by 1991.

Capri Sun GmbH (renamed from SiSi-Werke in 2018) is organized and headquartered in Germany and is a subsidiary of Swiss companies Capri Sun AG and Capri Sun Group Holding AG and of German company Wild. When Rudolf Wild & Co. went public in 2009, Hans-Peter Wild excluded Capri Sun AG from the offering to avoid losing control of it. Wild licenses the brand to different companies, which as of 2009 bottle Capri-Sun in 18 countries; Wild subsidiary INDAG supplies the various bottling plants. Another subsidiary, Pouch Partners, which has served as Capri-Sun's pouch supplier, was sold to CCL Industries in 2023 and rebranded as CCL Specialty Pouches.

In 2009 Capri-Sun's global sales of 1.106 billion liters of absolute volume (243 million imp gal; 292 million U.S. gal) ranked third in the world among fruit juice brands, after Tropicana and Minute Maid. At that time, per capita consumption in the United States and Germany was around 6 Capri-Sun pouches per year, while the French island of Réunion—a major Capri-Sun exporter where the juice sells for the same price as water—had the highest per capita consumption at 9.6. As of 2023, Capri-Sun sells an estimated 6 billion pouches per year globally. As of 2024, Forbes reports sales in more than 100 countries, netting roughly $500 million per year.

=== Europe ===
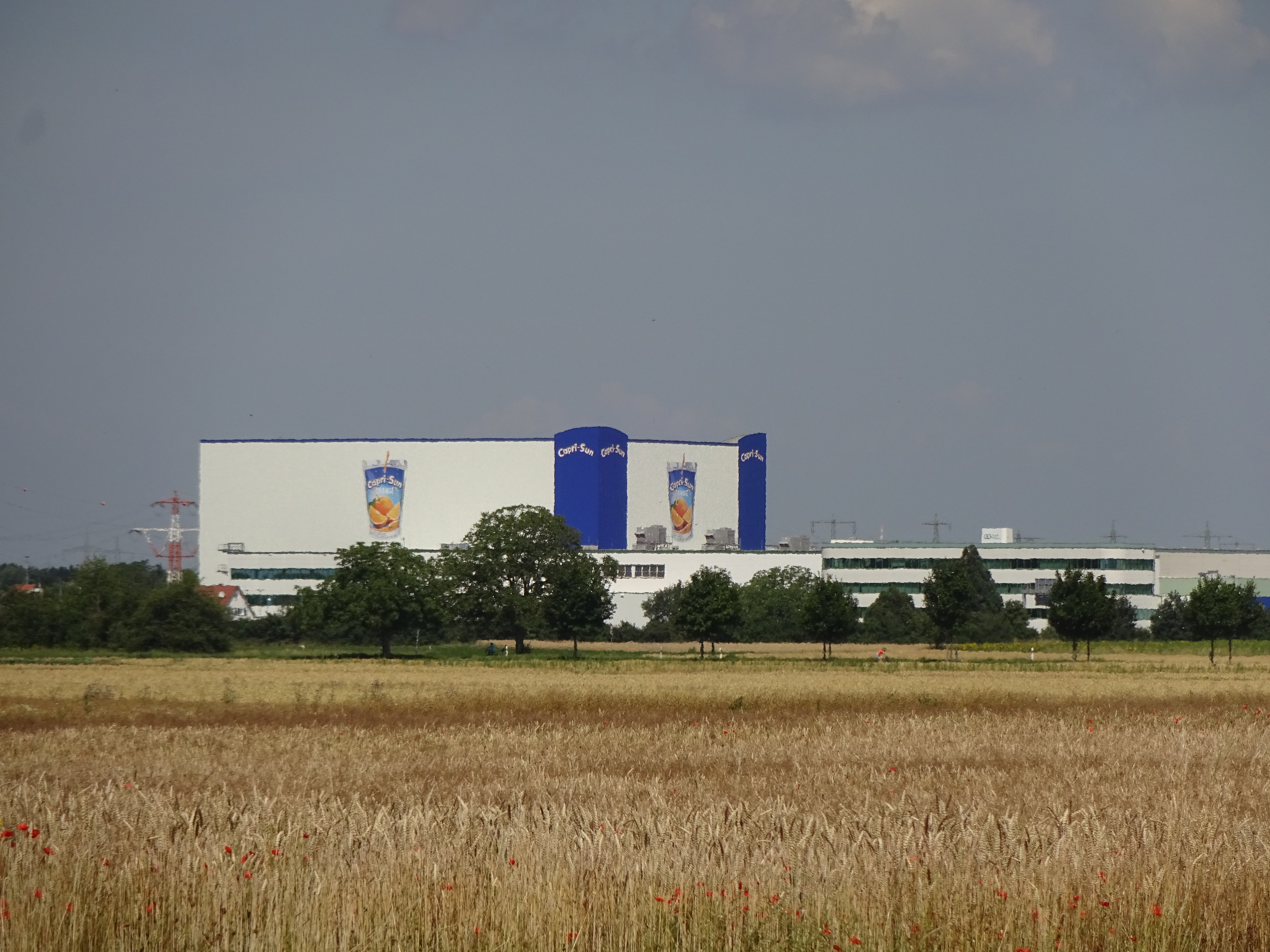
The Capri-Sun factory in Eppelheim, Germany, is shaped like a box of Capri-Sun.

After initial poor sales under RHM Foods, Coca-Cola Schweppes Beverages took over production of Capri-Sun in the United Kingdom in 1994. Coca-Cola Enterprises (CCE), which bought Coca-Cola Schweppes in 1997, began selling the drink in France in 2007. As the number of children in Germany aged 6 to 12 decreased, SiSi-Werke developed a resealable spouted pouch aimed toward older demographics, which debuted in Germany and the United Kingdom by 2009. By 2014, CCE was selling Capri-Sun in France, Ireland, the Netherlands, and the United Kingdom; its successors Coca-Cola European Partners and Coca-Cola Europacific Partners (CCEP) continued selling the brand. In Ukraine, as of 2015 Capri-Sun is licensed to Rosinka. In France, 213 million pouches were sold in 2016, a 24% increase from the previous year. Sales increased another 20% to 250 million the next year.

In February 2017 SiSi-Werke announced that it would rename Capri-Sonne to Capri-Sun in Germany, the last country to have retained the original name. The brand faced some criticism for the change, some of it lighthearted in tone; they did not rule out reintroducing the name later. Three months later, Capri Sun Group's CEO reported no negative impact on sales. Starting in 2018, Capri Sun Group began assuming direct control of more of its distribution, starting with Switzerland, Austria, the Middle East, China, and Poland. Citing a desire to be more "agile and responsive", in 2023 it announced an end to its agreement with CCEP (covering Belgium, France, Luxembourg, the Netherlands, Portugal, Spain, Sweden, and the United Kingdom), with a gradual transition to begin in March 2024. It hired an additional 70 employees for the CCEP transition.

=== North America ===
==== 1979–1991: Shasta Beverages ====
In 1979 Shasta Beverages (then a part of Consolidated Foods) began to license the drink from Wild in the United States under the name Capri Sun. After two promising test runs in Buffalo, New York, and Atlanta, Georgia, Shasta began a rolling expansion, starting with the Midwestern and Southeastern United States in 1980 and 1981.

When Shasta introduced the product in the United States, its single-serving packaging was unusual in contrast with the 46-US-fluid-ounce (1.4 L) cans that dominated the fruit juice market. Despite initial issues on the rollout, the packaging was light, durable, blunt, long-lasting, freezable, and insular. The patented design, trademarked under the name Doy-N-Pack and exclusively licensed by Shasta from Wild, soon faced a competitor in aseptic "brick packaging" like Tetra Brik. Both proved popular in stores, and Doy-N-Pack would usher in the use of pouches for single-serving food and beverage containers in the United States.

Shasta intended the product for children around 7 to 12; its marketing director for new products told a journalist, "Adults have a mental block about putting the straw in—they try to be careful, and it just doesn't work." Instead of general advertising, Shasta's marketing placed image spots in kids' magazines such as DuckTales and Sports Illustrated for Kids, building brand loyalty based on promotional offers, word of mouth, and child-oriented package design. Early marketing emphasized the product as all-natural, a designation that was met with some criticism. By 1982, it had a 10% market share where it was available and was aiming for a 15–20% share against competitors Hi-C and Hawaiian Punch, which were about half its price. Most of Capri Sun's early market share gains came at the expense of small brands.

In 1983 the Capri Sun brand brought Shasta $28 million in sales. In 1985, Sara Lee (the former Consolidated Foods) sold Shasta to National Beverage. Capri Sun Inc., a dedicated subsidiary, was established to market Capri Sun in the 1980s, headquartered in San Mateo, California, with factories in nearby Fresno and in Granite City, Illinois.

==== 1991–present: Kraft Foods ====
In December 1991 Kraft General Foods (Note: Renamed Kraft Foods, Inc. in 1995. The North American grocery business was split off in 2012 as Kraft Foods Group; the rest of the company became Mondelez International. Kraft Foods Group merged with Heinz to become part of Kraft Heinz in 2015.) announced a buyout of Capri Sun Inc. for $155 million ($306 million in 2025), making it part of General Foods USA. The acquisition was expected to strengthen the Kraft's share in the juices and drinks market and increase Capri Sun's marketing power. The acquisition covered marketing rights in the United States (extending to Puerto Rico), Canada, (Note: Capri Sun was being advertised in Canada by March 1991, continuing after Kraft's purchase in September; a 2009 CNN Money article noted Kraft as the distributor there.) and Mexico, (Note: Kraft announced in 2000 that it would be launching Capri Sun in Mexico, imported from the U.S.; in 2013, Jumex, rather than Kraft, announced plans to bring Capri-Sun to the Mexican market for the first time, with Capri Sun AG and sister company WILD-INDAG providing equipment and support.) the former two of which Kraft retains rights in as of 2022.

Kraft's parent company, Philip Morris Cos. (later renamed Altria), had been barred from marketing cigarettes to children, but had accrued significant experience in selling to young people before the ban was implemented. To make use of this expertise, they acquired sugary drink brands, including Capri Sun, Kool-Aid, and Tang. The campaign they created emphasized flashy colors and beach scenes, evoking a bright and fun-seeming "California cool"; later, they would switch to a sporty theme. In 1994, Philip Morris added Capri Sun to Lunchables, prepackaged lunch sets for schoolchildren. By 2006, marketing techniques had gone online as well, including a website where children under the age of 13 could submit photos for a chance to win a vacation for their families or send Capri Sun–themed greeting cards. These techniques were extremely successful: by 1996, Capri Sun was selling 26% more each year than the last, and sales had risen to over $230 million from around $100 million in 1991. This rise was also attributed to improvements in manufacturing efficiency. In 2008, Capri Sun went from projecting a 5% drop in sales to a 17% increase because of a "Respect the Pouch" campaign aimed at 6–12-year-olds. A 2019 review in The BMJ, which criticized the health effects of marketing sugary drinks to children, found that the marketing techniques introduced by Philip Morris were still in use, even after Kraft became independent of it in 2007.

In the 2020s Capri Sun has been noted for its marketing to parents. In 2020, Kraft used the Granite City plant to manufacture pouches of filtered water labeled "we're sorry it's not juice", donating 5 million pouches to schools in the Granite City area and Chicagoland. The accompanying ad campaign, according to Ad Age, was targeted towards parents in the area who were concerned about COVID-19 pandemic safety restrictions shutting down drinking fountains. In 2022, the company released an advertisement more directly targeted at parents in light of new regulations, starring a character named "Juicio". The character, modeled after the male leads of romance novels (such as those modeled by Fabio), appears onscreen in-character for long enough to try and disinterest children viewers and then changes tack to pitch Capri Sun to the adults still watching. This was not their first foray into marketing to parents: under Philip Morris Cos., Capri Sun slightly changed the formula to include juice concentrate, which allowed them to include "Natural fruit drink. No artificial flavors." on the packaging.

=== Africa and Asia ===
In 1980 Capri-Sun established a factory in Nigeria. As of 2019 the brand is licensed there by Chi Limited, a Coca-Cola Company subsidiary. A second African factory was established in Viana, Angola, in 2013. In 2012, SDU Beverages of India agreed to produce Capri-Sun there, with distribution rights in Bangladesh, the Maldives, Nepal, and Sri Lanka. SDU has produced pouches from a factory in Hyderabad since 2014. In L'Étang-Salé on Réunion, a French island in the Indian Ocean, Grand Sud Productions has operated a factory since 2004, which also distributes to Madagascar, Mauritius, Mayotte, and Tahiti. By 2016, the factory had produced more pouches than either Angola or India.

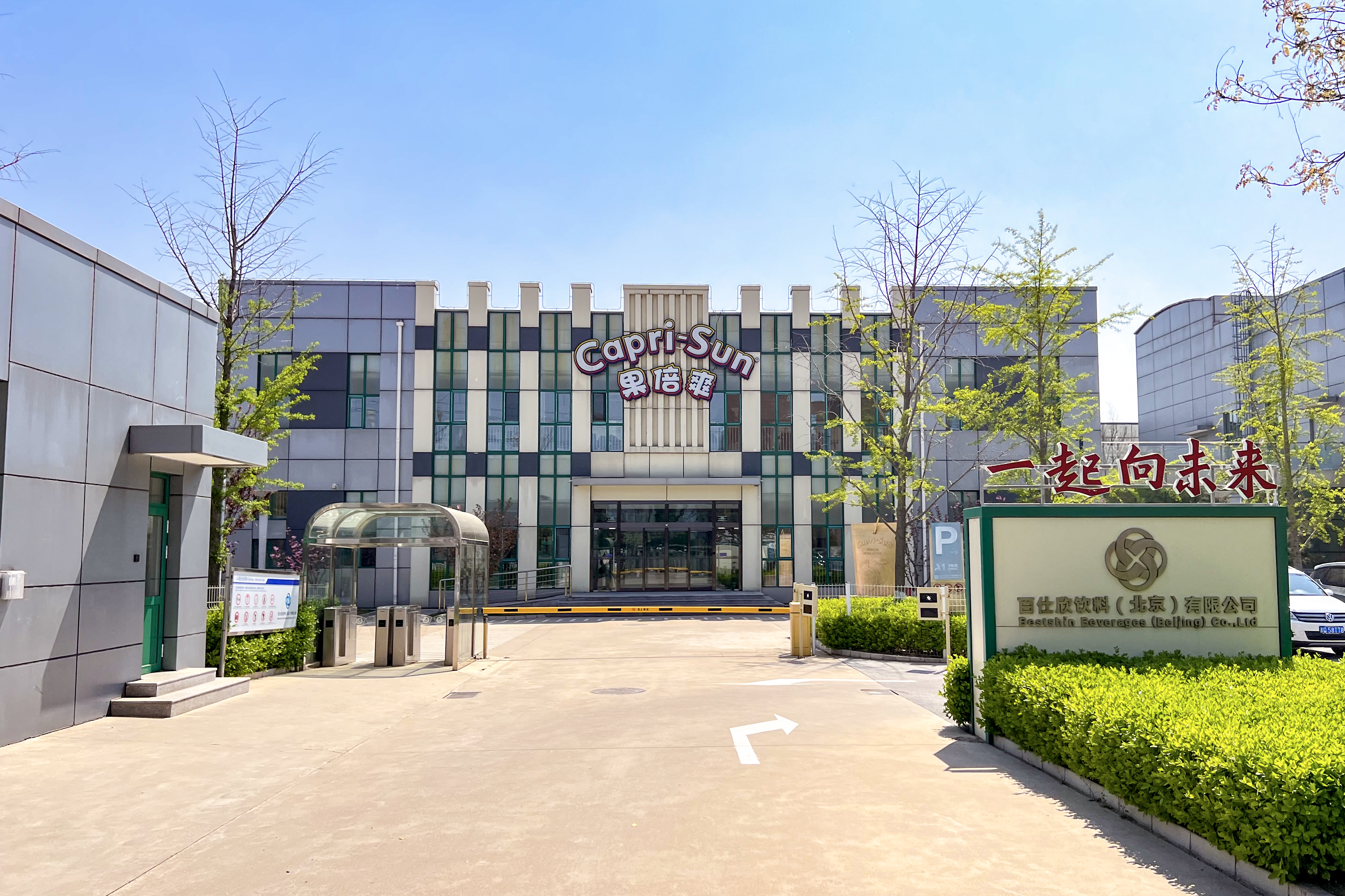
The Capri-Sun factory in the Beijing Yanqi Economic Development Area

Capri-Sun products first became available in China in 2005 but did not spread beyond the Beijing area until 2015, when Reignwood Group partnered with Capri-Sun to expand nationwide. Their factory in the Beijing Yanqi Economic Development Area has a capacity of 650 million pouches per year. According to China Daily, Capri-Sun sold 80 million pouches in China in 2015. Agthia Group began producing Capri-Sun in the United Arab Emirates in 2009, also selling to the rest of the Gulf Cooperation Council, excluding Saudi Arabia. Agthia discontinued their sale of Capri-Sun in 2020.

== Products ==
=== Contents ===
A Capri-Sun executive told China Daily in 2016 that they produce 27 flavors worldwide. The best-known flavor globally is Orange. In the United States, an initial roster of Apple, Fruit Punch, (Note: Pear, grape, orange, apple, pineapple) Lemonade, and Orange has expanded to include Mountain Cooler, (Note: Apple and raspberry) Pacific Cooler, (Note: Apple, cherry, pineapple, and grape) Strawberry Kiwi, Tropical Punch, (Note: Strawberry, orange, pineapple, lemon, and lime, among other flavors) and Wild Cherry. Options vary by country: In France as of 2017, for instance, the only flavors in the main line are Classic (orange) and Red Multifruit (Note: Apple, blackcurrant, and cherry) and Yellow Multifruit (Note: Apple, banana, and passionfruit) organic ("Bio") flavors; Orange, Tropical, Blackcurrant, and Cherry are sold in the United Kingdom as of 2022; and as of 2015 the Chinese market has Orange, White Grape, Pear, and Peach Apple. Flavor profile also varies: German fruit flavors are riper than French ones. Flavors in China, Mexico, and the United Arab Emirates are sweeter than those in Europe, which Capri-Sun says is to cater to local tastes; likewise, Hungarian cherry flavors are more sour than elsewhere.

Flavor notes

In addition to the main line of juice concentrate–based beverages, American Capri Sun products have included four no-added-sugar lines—100% Juice, Fruit Refreshers, Fruit & Veggie Blends (previously Super V), and Organic—and Roarin' Waters, a line of flavored waters. The United Kingdom has its flavored water line, Fruity Water (sold in Mango Passionfruit and Blackcurrant). A "No Added Sugar" version debuted there in 2015, in 2020 becoming "No Added Sugar Nothing Artificial" through use of stevia as a sweetener; in 2023, Capri-Sun began replacing it with "Zero Added Sugar", which contains sucralose. Fruit Crush, another no-added-sugar line, is sold in France in Apple Strawberry and Tropical flavors. Capri-Sun squash (concentrated syrup) is sold in the United Kingdom and Germany. Sisi-Werke introduced an organic variety of the drink in 2011.

A 2009 comparison of various flavored drinks published by the Harvard T.H. Chan School of Public Health classified Capri Sun Strawberry Kiwi in the least healthy tier, alongside all of the other surveyed fruit punch and fruit juice drinks. Drinks in this tier, which had a classification requirement of more than 12 grams (2.9 teaspoons) of sugar per 12 fluid ounces (.35L), were recommended for consumption only "sparingly and infrequently". At 34 grams (8.1 tsp) of sugar, the drink's sugar content was the lowest in the fruit drinks category. Capri Sun Lemon Lime, a sports drink with 20 grams (4.8 tsp) of sugar per 12 ounces, was also placed in the least healthy tier. In 2015, facing declining sales, Kraft switched the main Capri Sun line from high-fructose corn syrup (HFCS) to regular sugar and switched the Roarin' Waters flavored water brand from HFCS and sucralose to sugar and stevia, dropping the sugar content from 30g per 12 ounces to 26g. In 2022, Capri Sun cut the sugar content of its pouches by just under half by adding monk fruit concentrate. The same year, CCEP changed the composition of some of its Capri-Sun flavors to be compliant with the United Kingdom's new rules on food high in fat, salt, and sugar.

In January 2007 a Florida woman, backed by the Center for Science in the Public Interest, filed suit against Kraft for deceptive packaging, alleging that its usage of HFCS made its claimed "all-natural" status inaccurate. Kraft announced a day later that they would cease labeling Capri Sun that way as part of a planned reformulation and repackaging, replacing the words with "no artificial colors, flavors, or preservatives". Tesco, the largest supermarket chain in the United Kingdom, announced in 2015 that it would stop selling Capri-Sun pouches with added sugar, as part of an initiative that also affected competitors Ribena and Rubicon; The Guardian characterized the move as an unprecedented action against branded sugary drink suppliers. In January 2023, a class action was filed in the United States, disputing the "no artificial colors, flavors, or preservatives" tagline in light of Capri Sun apple juice's incorporation of citric acid.

=== Packaging ===
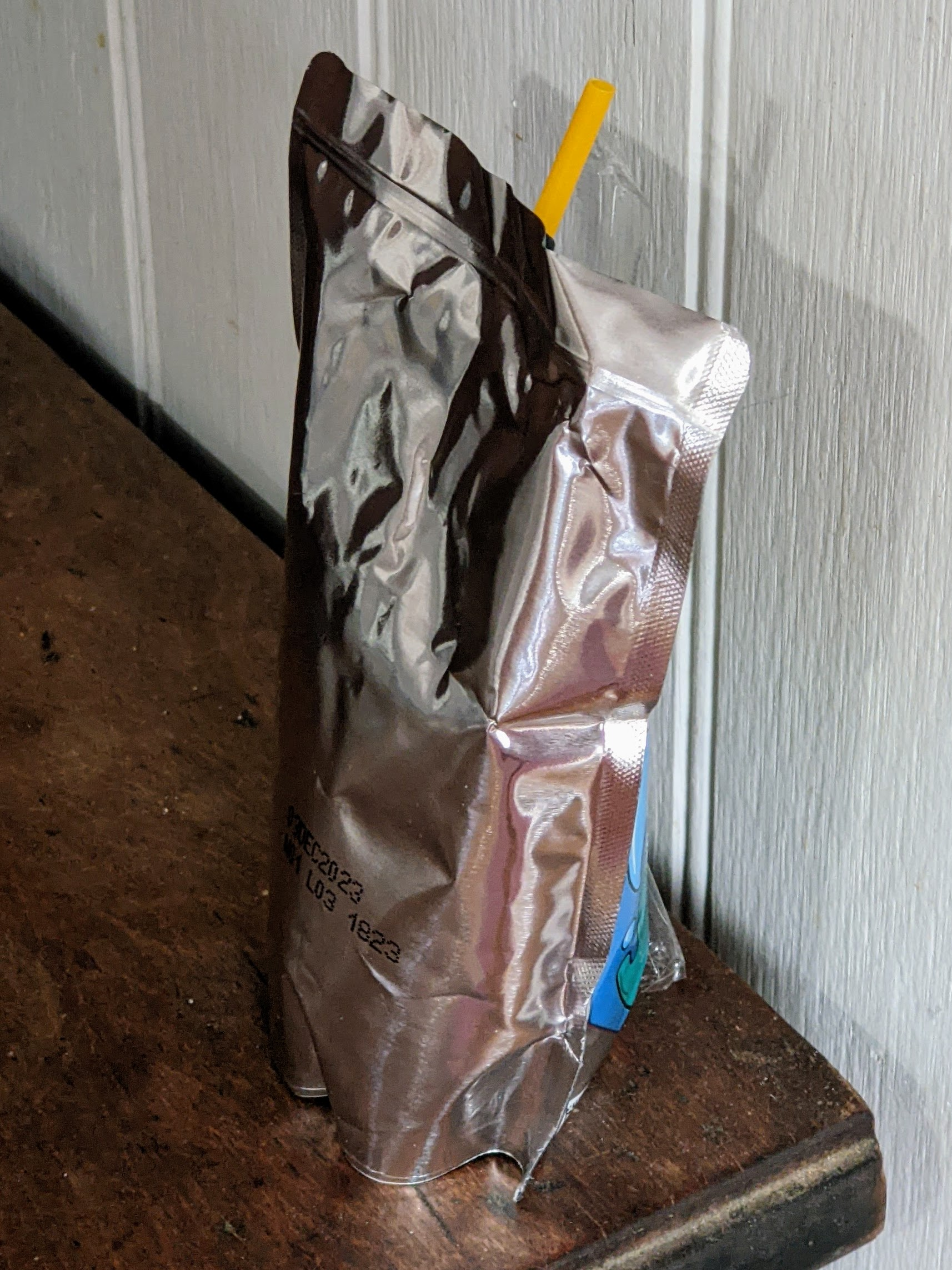
A Kraft-made Capri Sun Doy-N-Pack pouch standing upright

Capri-Sun drinks are stored in laminate foil pouches made of aluminium, polyester, and polyethylene, usually 200 milliliters (7.0 imp fl oz; 6.8 U.S. fl oz) in volume. The distinctive Doy-N-Pack pouches were developed by Rudolf Wild & Co. in collaboration with Thimonnier. The pouches have become a key part of Capri-Sun's brand identity, and their advent in the United States, where Tetra Brik packaging had yet to debut, played a major role in popularizing stand-up pouches. In the United States, the pouches, sold in packs of 10, were initially double the price of their 46-US-fluid-ounce (1.4 L) competitors, but over time stand-up pouches have become cheaper than alternatives. The Doy-N-Pack patents expired in the 1990s. Around 1998, stand-up pouches overtook aseptic "brick" packaging as the more common format for food and beverages.

Capri-Suns were introduced with plastic-wrapped plastic straws. After England banned single-use plastic straws in 2020, Capri-Sun introduced paper straws to its pouches in the United Kingdom, a move it said was environmentally friendly. Capri-Sun drew some criticism for the straws' inability to pierce the pouch in opening the drink and the still-existing plastic wrapping on the straw, which Capri-Sun said was required under British law.

SiSi-Werke attempted to secure trademarks for eight of its pouch designs in the European Union (although not the original pouch shape), in the context of fruit drinks and fruit juices. The European Court of Justice, which has consistently rejected trademarks based on product shape, rejected the request in 2006. The shape is trademarked in Germany, where SiSi-Werke has won multiple court cases defending it. Capri Sun GmbH has filed some lawsuits in the United States to defend its trademark on the pouch design, securing a $650,000 licensing fee from Faribault Foods in one case. In 2017, Capri Sun GmbH sued the pouch manufacturer American Beverage, claiming that the pouches it supplied to SunnyD and 23 other brands constituted trademark infringement. In April 2022, U.S. District Judge Paul A. Engelmayer found conflicting evidence for Capri Sun GmbH's claim that the pouch design was regularly associated with Capri Sun by consumers. The parties reached a settlement-in-principle in October 2023 on the eve of the trial.

After a series of instances in which mold was found in its pouches, Kraft in 2014 introduced clear bottoms, both to assuage concerns about mold and emphasize the lack of artificial colors, which internal research showed most consumers were unaware of. Occasional mold reports have continued, including in a viral 2021 TikTok in which a father shows the mold through a pouch's clear bottom. Kraft stresses that the mold is naturally occurring, and may arise due to small punctures. Kraft permanently reverted to foil bottoms in 2022, citing supply chain issues. The same year, Kraft recalled over 5,000 Wild Cherry pouches after discovering some were contaminated with cleaning supplies.

The packaging of Capri-Sun has been the subject of scrutiny. In 2015, U.S. environmental activist groups started a campaign to make Kraft rethink its packaging of Capri Sun, claiming that the packages are not easily recycled, resulting in 1.4 billion pouches littered annually. Capri Sun pouch recycling is done by TerraCycle, founded in 2001, but according to environmental groups, only 2% of pouches are recycled this way. In Germany, Capri-Sun purchases a recycling guarantee from the aluminium industry (which does the recycling), getting a Green Dot on every pouch and box of pouches. A 2001 essay by Niklas Maak, however, termed Capri-Sonne the "antichrist of the environmentalists" in 1980s Germany for its 12% juice content, as well as the packaging materials. "More waste is not possible for 0.2 liters (6.8 U.S. fl oz) of aqueous liquid", he wrote.

In addition to the well-known Doy-N-Pack pouch, Capri-Sun comes in other packaging in various markets. Products targeting older demographics have included a resealable 330-milliliter (12 imp fl oz; 11 U.S. fl oz) pouch with spout and safety cap, and in the United States a 16.5-US-fl-oz (0.5 L) aluminium "bottle can" manufactured in Japan by Daiwa Can Company. The squash lines are sold in one-liter plastic bottles.

== Impact ==
=== Health and public perception ===
At the same time that Philip Morris Cos. and Kraft marketed Capri Sun to children, child obesity rates in the United States began rising, a phenomenon attributed in part to the rise in sugary drinks consumption across the board. Food industry advertising, including the marketing of sugary drinks to children, has been linked to adverse effects on diet. A 2013 online poll from Foodwatch, a European consumer protection group, resulted in Capri-Sun receiving a "Golden Windbag" award for perceived deceptive advertising to children. Capri-Sun denied that its advertising was targeted towards children.

Parents who respond to surveys tend to overrate the health value of Capri Sun and underestimate its harmful additives. A 2015 study in Public Health Nutrition on American parents' attitudes towards sugary drinks found that 36% of surveyed parents with children between the ages of 2 and 17 rated Capri Sun as "somewhat" or "very healthy"; 48% say that they gave the drink to their children in that age group. Black and Hispanic parents were significantly more likely to rate Capri Sun as healthy than white parents, and the rating was higher than sugary fruit drinks as a category, which only 30% of parents gave the same rating. Regarding Roarin' Waters, 39% rated the same, but only 16% said they give their children a drink. Hispanic parents were significantly more likely than white parents to rate the product as healthy, although black parents were not. Roarin' Waters was one of a few products to be rated less healthy than its category overall; 48% rated flavored water drinks as healthy. The study concluded that those parents may have selected Capri Sun Roarin' Waters because they considered it a healthier option. A 2021 survey published in Pediatric Obesity found that most parents with young children correctly guessed that the Fruit Punch and Roarin' Waters flavors had added sugar, but a majority did not accurately guess that Roarin' Waters contained non-nutritive sweeteners. Only 3.1% of respondents who looked at the front packaging of Roarin' Waters correctly assessed that it contained no juice, and that number increased to a slight majority for those who viewed an information panel about the drink. Niklas Maak criticized the trend of Capri-branded items in West Germany at the time it was launched, terming it a flashy way to sell poor-quality products, and specifically criticized the Capri-Sonne packaging as difficult to handle and use.

In 2015, author Josephine Lébard noted Capri-Sun's popularity, along with that of SunnyD, in Clichy-sous-Bois, a banlieue near Paris—indicative of the drink's broad popularity in poorer areas in France. A representative of Coca-Cola France told Slate.fr in 2018 that 87% of families with children under 15 recognized the Capri-Sun brand. A 2021 report from the Rudd Center for Food Policy and Health found that the average black child in the United States between the ages of 6 and 11 viewed an ad for Capri-Sun 21 times in 2018; for a white child in the same age group, that number was 11.

A 2022 Morning Consult survey of American Generation Z adults ranked Capri Sun in 17th place out of over 4,000 on a list of their most favored brands, rated favorably by 77% of respondents. Capri Sun was also one of the brands with the largest differential between Gen Z and older peers; the brand's favorability rating with Gen Z was 16 percentage points higher than the U.S. adult population at large, 19th highest in the brands surveyed, and 7 percentage points higher than the Millennial (Gen Y) respondents, for 16th place.

=== Reception ===
A 2022 review of fruit punch drinks in the Marin Independent Journal gave Capri Sun All Natural Fruit Punch two of four stars, noting its lower sugar content compared to other listed sugary drinks but criticizing its taste as "watery" and not evocative of the fruits depicted on the label. Marnie Shure of The Takeout, reviewing Capri Sun fruit punch after the addition of monk fruit, wrote that the sweetness had now become the primary flavor, rather than notes of actual fruit as before, and assessed a perhaps 5% increase in tartness, but complimented the lack of aftertaste she associated with most sweeteners. Chad Eschman of VinePair reviewed Capri Sun flavors as they relate to creating mixers; reviews included positively rating the combination of gin and Pacific Cooler as tasting like a large white gummy bear and negatively rating the combination of tequila and Tropical Cooler as "we've made a huge mistake".

A 2017 review of "your kids' lunch box favorites" by Brooke Jackson-Glidden and Cooper Green in the Statesman Journal noted the Capri Sun Strawberry Kiwi's 13 grams of sugar, praising its moderately sweet taste and small size. Green commented that it was "definitely not the best flavor of Capri Sun." The Daily Meal in 2021 (before the monk fruit change) faulted the 13 grams in Fruit Punch and 20 grams of fruit sugar in 100% Juice Fruit Punch, calling it a "red flag" and ranking Fruit Punch among the unhealthiest juice boxes. The publication further criticized the lack of Vitamin C in either.

Roarin' Waters faced early criticism for its sugariness and lack of juice. Gannett News Service's Kim Painter characterized it as "a reduced-calorie fruit drink, apparently made for children who expect all drinks, even water, to be sweet", while James Lileks of the Minneapolis Star Tribune wrote that his daughter thought it tasted like Easy Mac. The Daily Meal also ranked Roarin' Waters (all flavors) on its list of unhealthiest juice boxes, citing its lack of juice and its 8 grams of sugar. They granted that it may be an option for children who do not drink enough water and concluded, "It's not bad for you per se, but you may be better off diluting real juice with water."

=== In popular culture ===
Capri-Sun in Europe has sponsored a number of athletic endeavors, including holding naming rights to the cycling team previously known as IJsboerke in 1981 and 1982.

"Go ahead, stick the straw, stick the straw in the Capri-Sun."

[Vas-y plante la paille, plante la paille dans l'Capri-Sun.]

— BoyBandit, "CAPRI-SUN"

A number of French rap artists, including Jul and Timal, have referenced Capri Sun in their songs. Rappers BoyBandit and Edinho have both written songs called "CAPRI-SUN". Nicolas Santolaria of Le Monde described Capri-Sun as "the new ostentatious elixir of French rappers and gangsters". Humorist Alexandre Majirus connected the trend to a broader phenomenon of 1990s nostalgia in rap. A Coca-Cola France representative told Slate.fr that they were not working with the rappers and neither supported nor opposed the trend. Naps's "À part ça" (2017) originally depicted hiding drugs in a Capri-Sun pouch; the brand name was removed after Capri-Sun sought to have the video taken down.

As of 2023, the Guinness World Record for the fastest time to drink a Capri-Sun is held by Fayis Nazer of India, at 8.02 seconds. When the record was created, Guinness established a benchmark time at 18 seconds, but no one officially attempted to take the title until 2021, when Declan Evans of England completed the task in 16.65 seconds. The record has changed hands multiple times; Guinness says it has received over 100 applications for the title since the video of a successful attempt by André Ortolf of Germany went viral. As of 2024, the record for the fastest drinking time with a paper straw is held by Canadian speed eater Mike Jack, at 21.71 seconds.
