= Eppelheim =

- Town
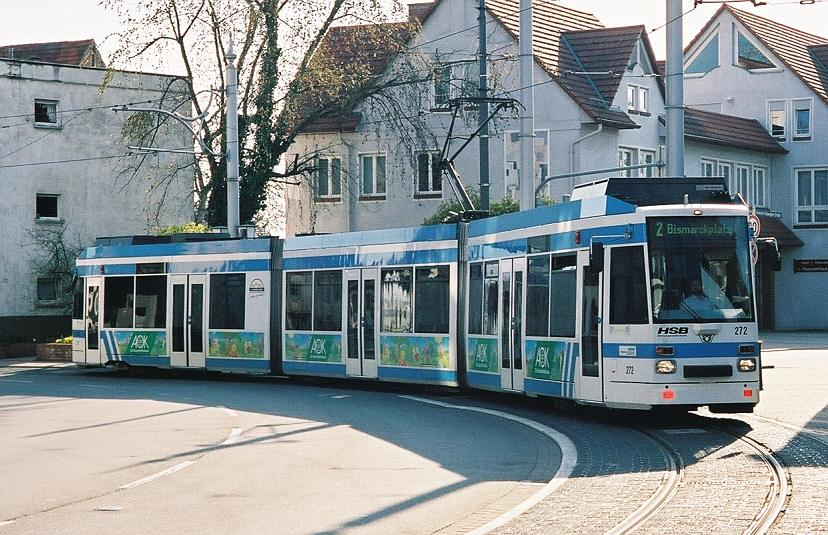
- Streetcar in Eppelheim

- Coat of arms

- Location of Eppelheim within Rhein-Neckar-Kreis district
- Interactive map of Eppelheim
- Location within Germany Location within Baden-Württemberg
- Coordinates: 49°24′N 8°38′E
- Country: Germany
- State: Baden-Württemberg
- Admin. region: Karlsruhe
- District: Rhein-Neckar-Kreis

Government
  - Mayor (2016–24): Patricia Rebmann (Ind.)

Area
  - Total: 5.7 km^{2} (2.2 sq mi)
- Elevation: 110 m (360 ft)

Population (2025-12-31)
  - Total: 15,706
  - Density: 2,800/km^{2} (7,100/sq mi)
- Time zone: UTC+01:00 (CET)
  - Summer (DST): UTC+02:00 (CEST)
- Postal codes: 69208–69214
- Dialling codes: 06221
- Vehicle registration: HD
- Website: www.eppelheim.de

Eppelheim (German pronunciation: [ˈɛpl̩haɪm]) is a city in northern Baden-Württemberg bordering Heidelberg. It belongs to the district Rhein-Neckar-Kreis.

== Geography ==
=== Location and neighboring communities ===
Eppelheim is situated in the valley of the Upper Rhine southwest of the hills of the Odenwald and directly on the Bundesautobahn 5.

The location of the city within the Rhein-Neckar-Kreis is almost completely surrounded by the urban district of Heidelberg. Eppelheim borders the Heidelberg boroughs of Wieblingen in the North, Pfaffengrund in the East, and Kirchheim in the South. To the West lies the municipality of Plankstadt, also within the Rhein-Neckar-Kreis.

Another center in the Rhein-Neckar metropolitan region is Mannheim, about 20 km (12 mi) northwest of Eppelheim.

=== Boroughs ===
Eppelheim does not have any boroughs, but locals orient on the directions of the compass and refer to the parts of the city that way. For example, northeast Eppelheim. However, there are no exact demarcations.

== History ==
Archaeological finds from the Neolithic, the Bronze Age, the Iron Age, and the early Middle Ages indicate that the area where the city is located was inhabited by people for a long time. Eppelheim was first mentioned in historical documents pertaining to a grant in the year 770 in the Lorsch codex under the name Ebbelenheim. From the 11th century Eppelheim was a typical small village of the Electorate of the Palatinate. The number of inhabitants remained continuously under 150 up until the 18th century. Among the reasons for this was the destruction of Eppelheim in 1689. The village, like so many others in the area, was burned down by French troops on 28 January during the War of the Grand Alliance.

Eppelheim was rebuilt and experienced a steady increase in population. In the 20th century the population boomed. The population went from 2644 in 1905 to 13,904 in 1997. The people of Eppelheim chose masonry as a career more than the average German in the 20th century. In 1908 there were over 400. Eppelheim is known in the region as a mason community.

In 1998 Eppelheim was elevated to city status by the State of Baden-Württemberg.

== Government ==
=== Municipal council ===
The municipal council of the city of Eppelheim has 22 members. They carry the title Stadträtin/Stadtrat (city councilor female/male).

Municipal council as of 13 June 2004
Party	Votes	Seats
CDU	%	10
SPD	%	6
Green	%	4
FDP	%	1
FWG (Freie Wähler Gemeinschaft)	%	1
Voter participation: %

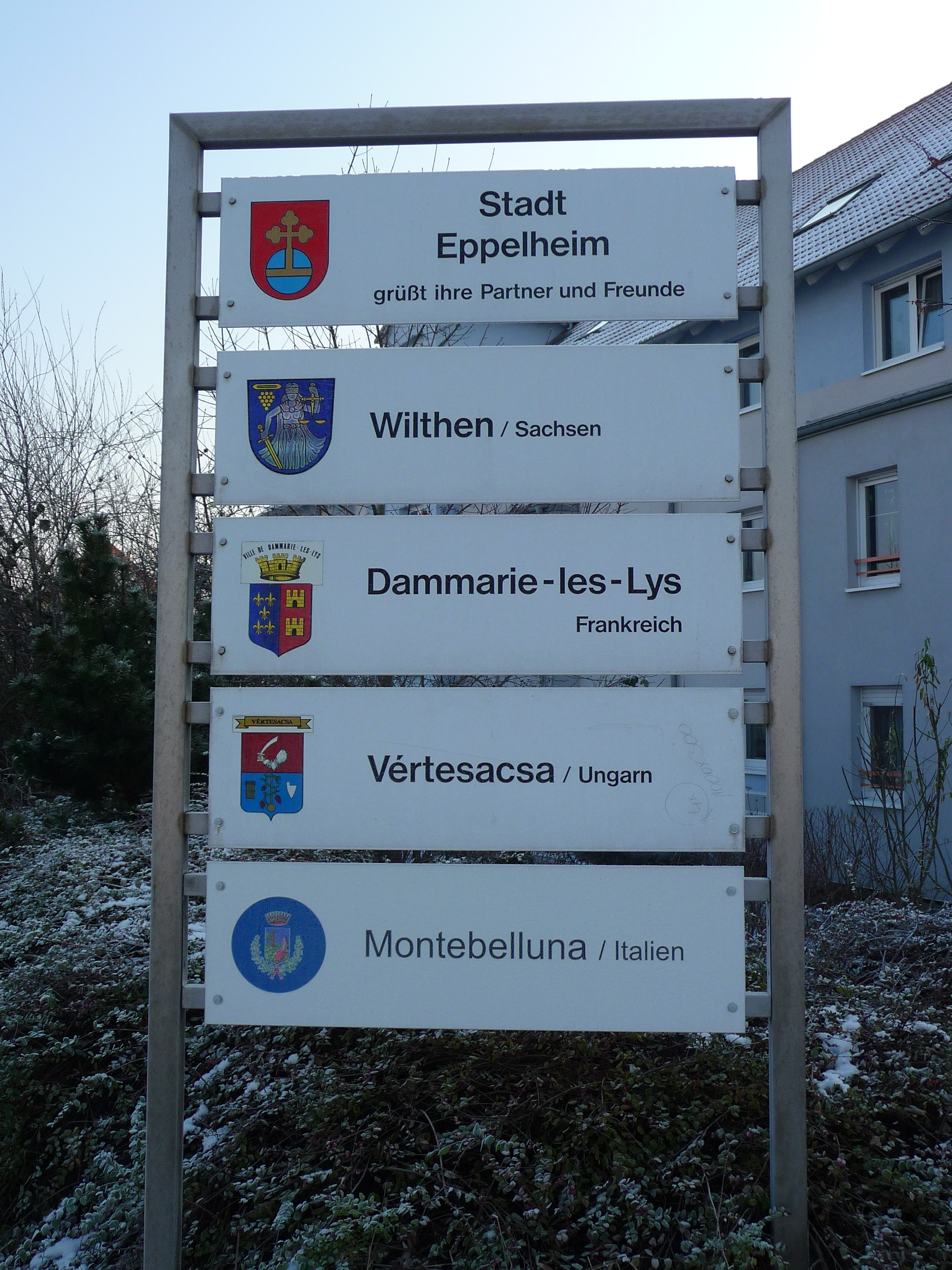
Twinned towns

=== Coat of arms ===
The coat of arms in its current form was introduced in 1900. It is based on a lost seal from 1689. The coat of arms matches inescutcheon of the old coat of arms of the Electorate of the Palatinate, which refers to the honor of the counts palatine of the Rhine. The flag is yellow and red and was awarded by the Ministry of State in 1959.

== International relations ==
Eppelheim is twinned with:

- Wilthen (Saxony), since 1989
- Dammarie-lès-Lys (France), since 1996

Friendly contacts have been established with the following cities:

- Vértesacsa (Hungary)
- Montebelluna (Italy)

== Economy and infrastructure ==
=== Businesses ===
The company Wild has its headquarters in Eppelheim and is the largest employer (including a factory of its subsidiary global brand Capri-Sun) in the southern part of the city with approximately 1400 workers. The tax on the company's business is an important factor in determining the city budget.

=== Transportation ===
Eppelheim is directly on the Bundesautobahn 5 and has access through the Heidelberg/Schwetzingen exit.

The city is connected to the neighboring university city, Heidelberg by the well travelled streetcar line 22. The streetcar is run by the Rhein-Neckar-Verkehr GmbH (RNV). The connection leads to other public transit opportunities. Bus line 713 connects to Schwetzingen via Plankstadt. Intracity connections are offered by Eppelheim's bus line 732, run by Busverkehr Rhein-Neckar GmbH as the so-called City-Bus.

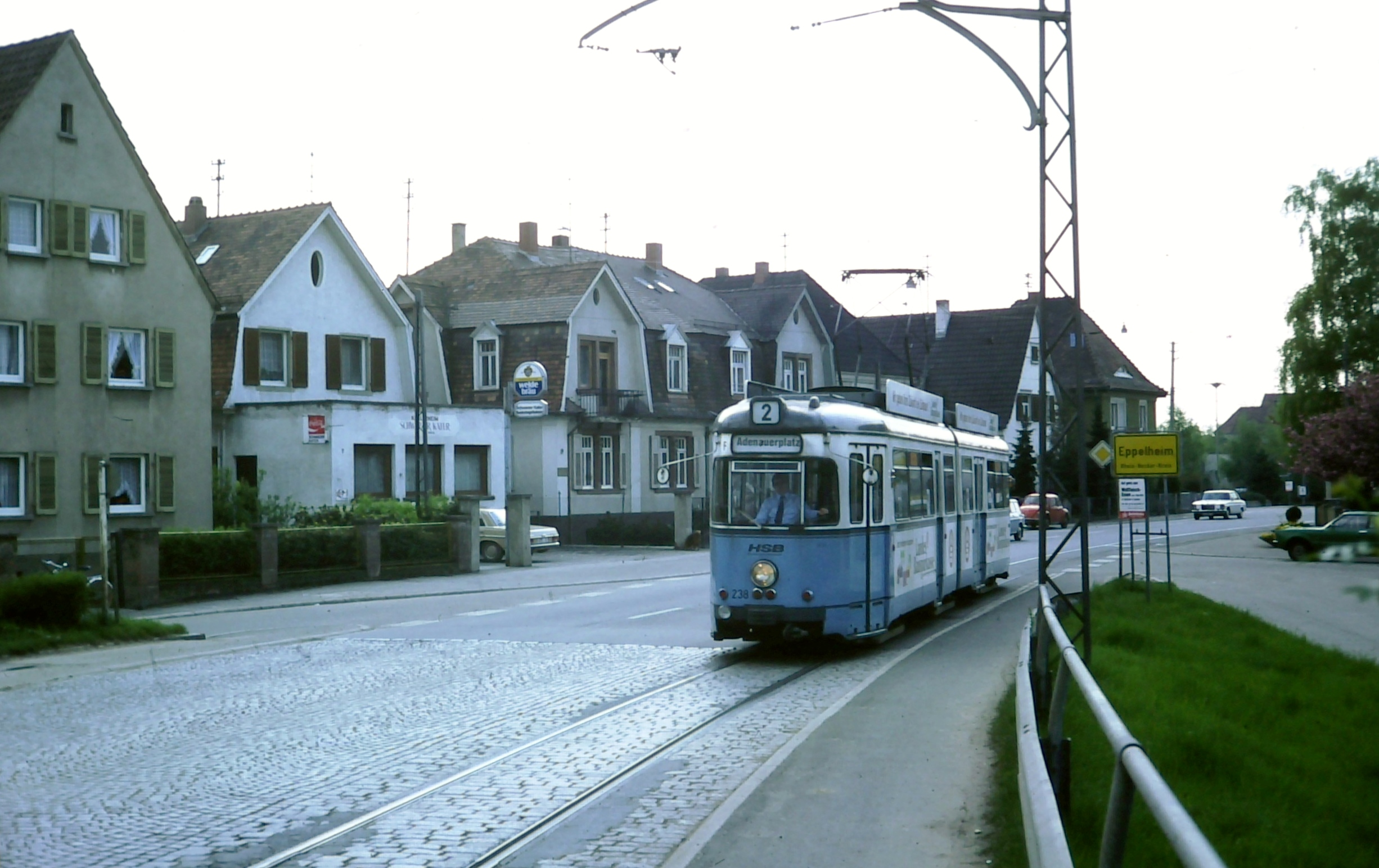
Heidelberg bound tram leaving Eppelheim, 1979

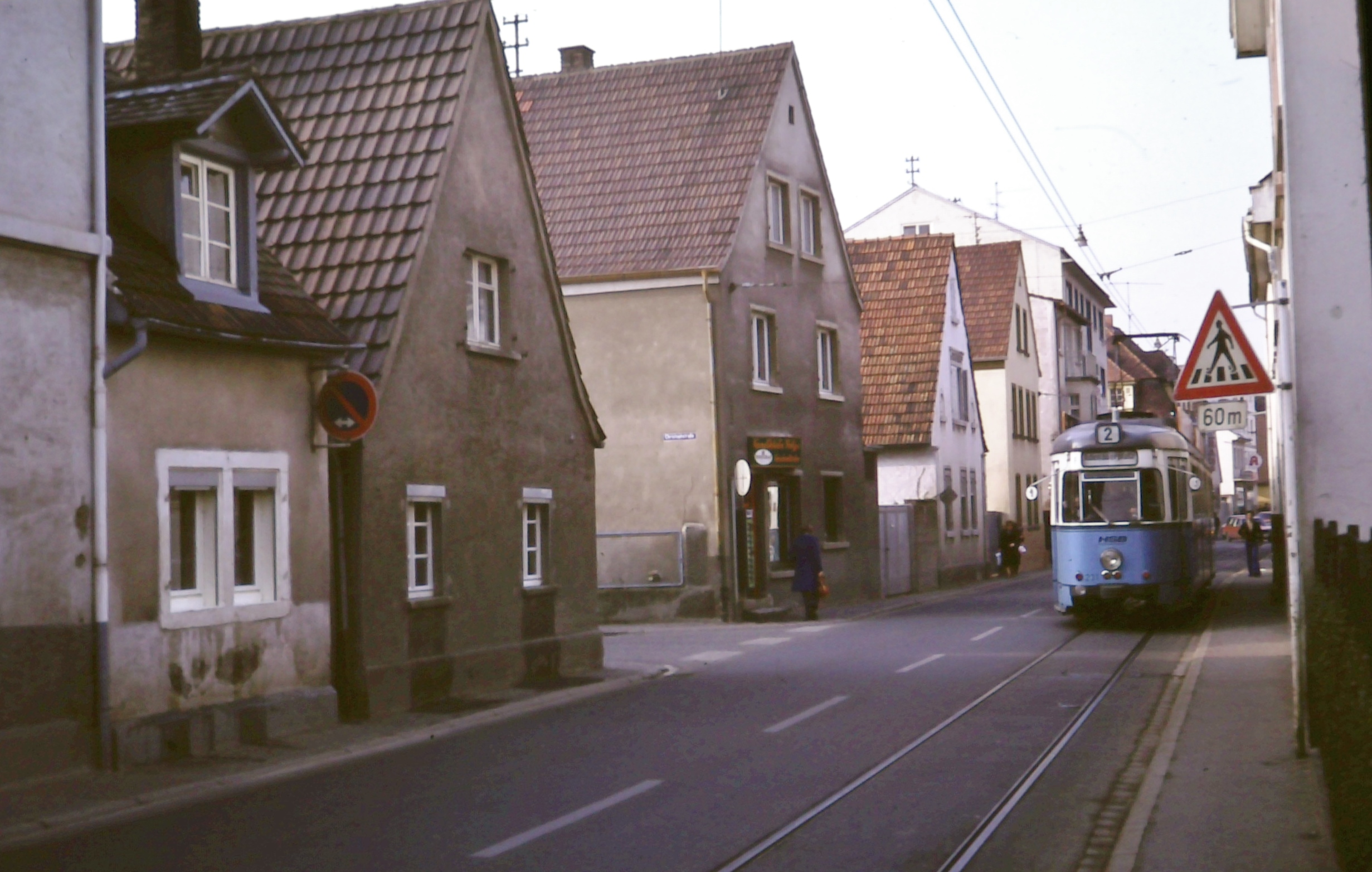
Tram in the main street Eppelheim, 1979

== Personality ==
=== Honorary citizen ===
- 1906: Jakob Neu (1836-1921), head teacher from 1878 to 1907
- Andreas Jäger, mayor from 1919 to 1933 and from 1945 to 1954
- 1979: Rudolf Wild (1904–1995), entrepreneur, founder of the Wild (company)
- Alois Berberich (1913–2000), second mayor
- 1997: Leonie Wild, (1908–2005) co-founder of the Wild-company
- 2001: Inge Burck
- 2003: Hans Stephan, retired rector
- 2006: Hans-Peter Wild, (born 1941), lawyer and entrepreneur

=== Personalities who have worked in Eppelheim ===
- Wolfgang Ketterle (born 1957), grew up in Eppelheim, holder of the Nobel Prize for Physics
- Ernst Knoll (1940–1997), eight times German champion and twice Olympic participant in wrestling
- Jakob Rupper (1896–1958), owner of a steel construction company and Member of the Landtag
- Wolfgang Ernst (born 1957), politician, Lord Mayor of Leimen 2000–2016
