= Wild Flavors =

American food company

WILD Flavors, Inc.
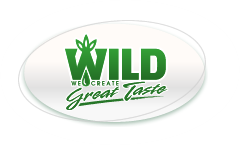
- Type: Private
- Industry: Flavors and colors
- Founded: 1994
- Founder: Dr. Hans-Peter Wild
- Headquarters: Erlanger, Kentucky, USA
- Website: ADM.com

Wild Flavors, Inc. (stylized as "WILD Flavors") is a manufacturer of flavors, colors, and food and beverage ingredients. Its headquarters is in Erlanger, Kentucky and the firm was originally affiliated with Rudolf WILD GmbH & Co. KG and Dr. Hans-Peter Wild. The company was acquired by Archer Daniels Midland (ADM) in 2014.

== History ==
In 1994, the Germany-based Wild Group acquired F&C Company in Cincinnati, OH and renamed it WILD Flavors Inc.

In 2008, the company acquired American Purpac Technologies in Beloit, WI.

In July 2014, the company announced it was being taken over by ADM in a $3 billion deal. The acquisition was completed in October 2014. At the time, ADM announced it would form a new business unit, WILD Flavors and Specialty Ingredients, to include WILD as well as several other ADM product lines.

== Partnerships ==
- 2006 - Cognis Health & Wellness
- 2007 - Diversified Natural Products
- 2009 - Sunwin International

== Products ==
- Resolver Technology - A mix of natural flavors and flavor extracts. It neutralises undesirable off-notes of ingredients having a bitter, soapy, metallic or burning aftertaste.
- SaltTrim - Allows reducing the amount of salt in foods and beverages products without impairing the taste.
- Colors From Nature - A line of natural colors and plant extracts .
