= Kewpie (mayonnaise) =

Japanese mayonnaise brand

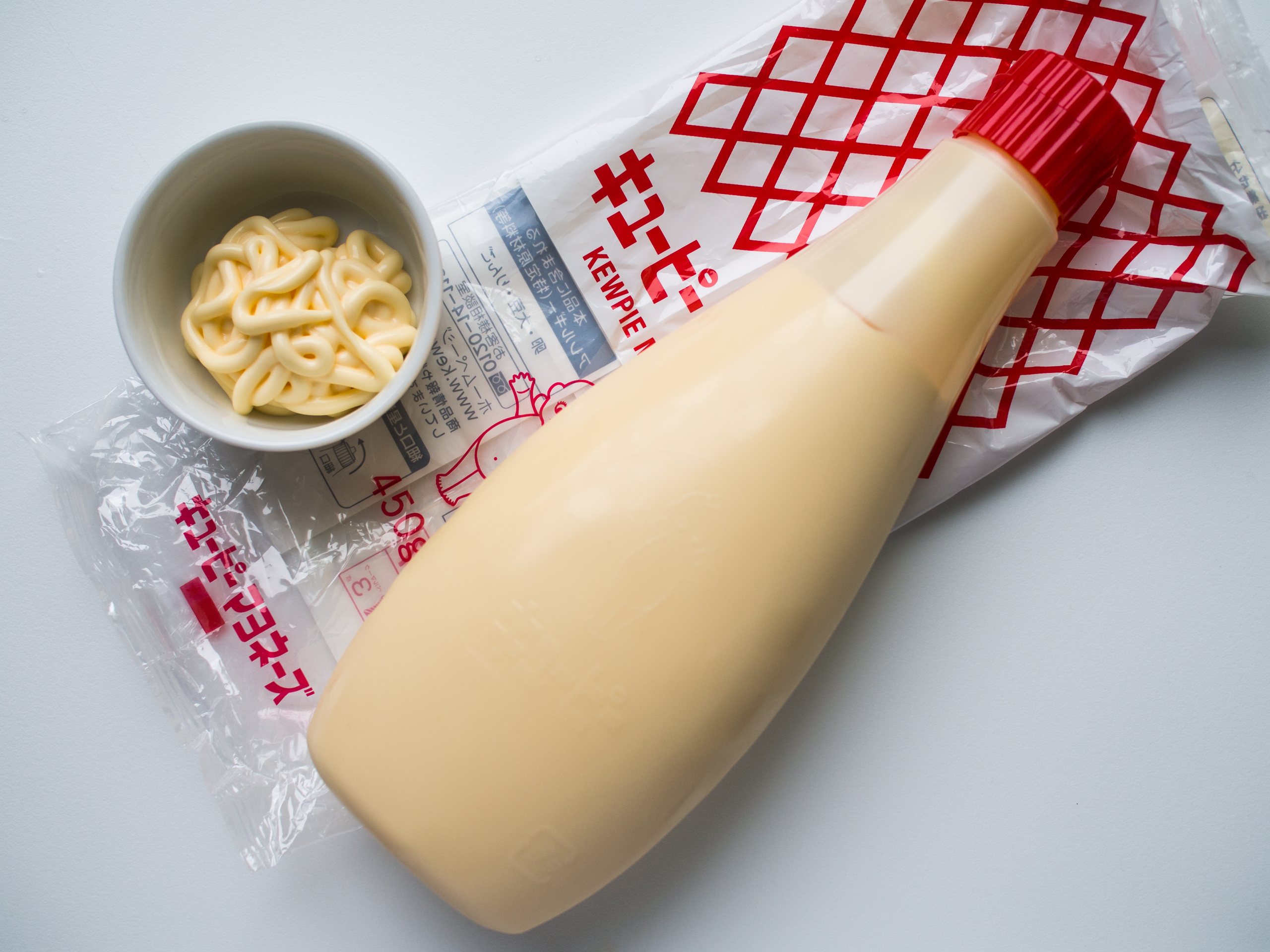
- Product type: Mayonnaise
- Country: Japan
- Introduced: 1925; 101 years ago
- Website: www.kewpie.com/en/

Kewpie (キユーピー, Kyūpī) (English: /kjuːpi/ KYOO-pee) is a Japanese brand of mayonnaise produced by the Kewpie Corporation (キユーピー株式会社, Kyūpī kabushikigaisha). It has a unique flavor, often attributed to its use of egg yolks in place of the whole eggs used in most brands of mayonnaise. Kewpie mayonnaise is associated with the tamago sando, the egg salad sandwich sold in konbini operated by 7-Eleven Japan.

Kewpie is the best-selling mayonnaise in Japan, and is also sold in other countries. Kewpie Corporation also produces a number of other condiments, including salad dressings, pasta sauces, and mustard sauce. Their main exports are mayonnaise and salad dressings. Domestically, they also sell and produce processed food such as kimipuchi for commercial use.

== History ==
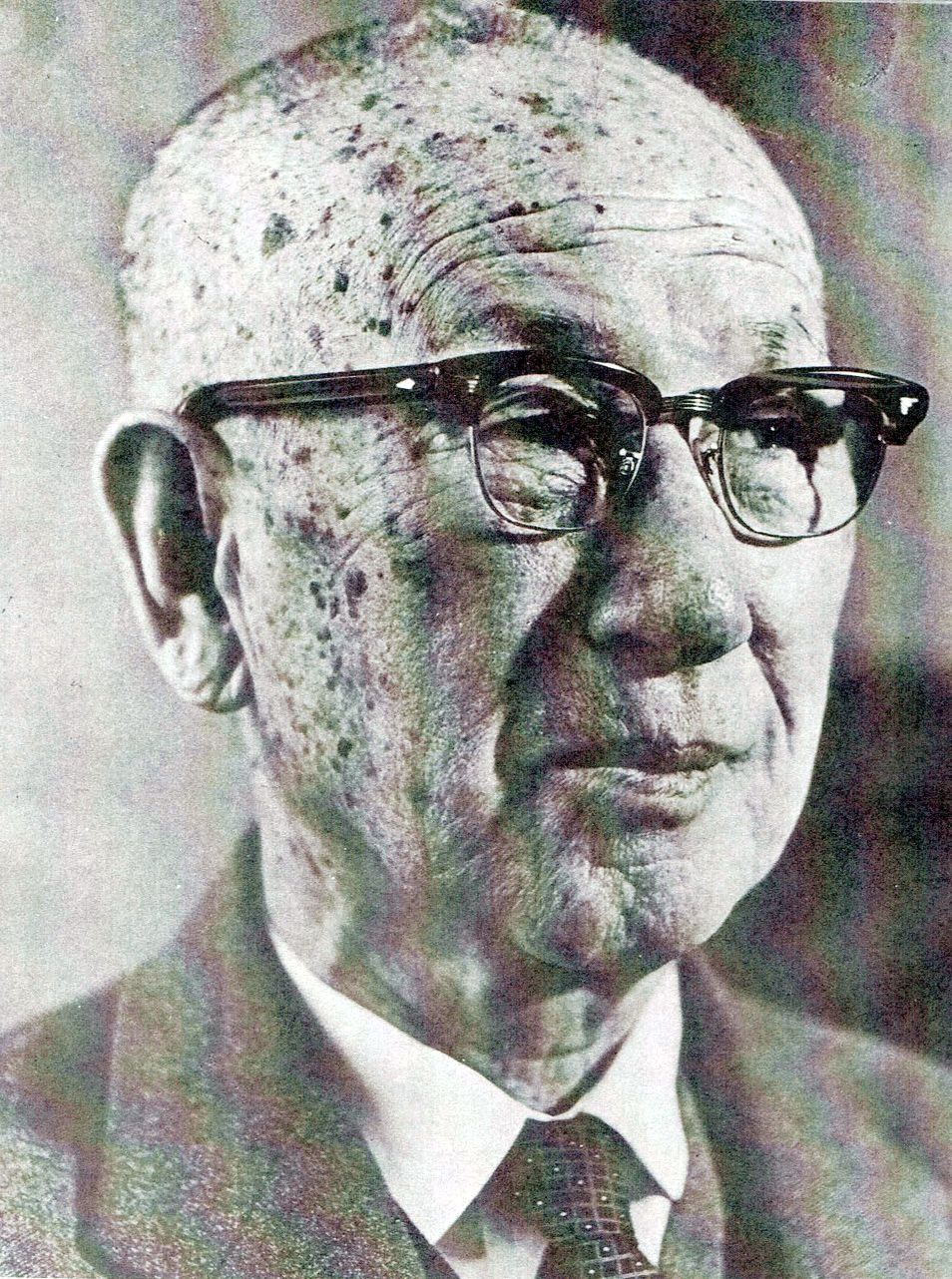
Toichiro Nakashima in 1967

Shokuhin Kogyo Co. Ltd. (食品工業株式会社) was founded in Nakano, Tokyo in 1919 by Toichiro Nakashima. He had previously worked in the United States for three years as an intern for the Ministry of Agriculture and Commerce, where he first encountered mayonnaise and the Kewpie doll that became his emblem. Originally, his business distributed canned salmon. Mayonnaise production began in 1925, and it has been the best-selling brand of mayonnaise in Japan ever since. The company is now called the Kewpie Corporation. The company stopped production of mayonnaise during World War II because of supply shortages and resumed production in 1948.

In 1998, the company was sued for US$7 million for trademark infringement by a Japanese businessman who had obtained the rights to the Kewpie doll in Japan. The company defended itself, saying that it had a trademark in Japan going back 73 years, and that the Kewpie character was in the public domain. The courts sided with the mayonnaise manufacturer.

In 2020, the company had sales of US$5 billion. The company also manufactures cosmetics and pharmaceuticals. Amane Nakashima is the current chairman of Kewpie Corp., and is also president of the affiliated Nakashimato Co., a food distribution company.

== Ingredients and flavor ==
Kewpie is made of apple cider vinegar or rice vinegar and egg yolks, resulting in a "more custardy consistency" than typical American mayonnaises, which are made out of whole eggs. It also contains vegetable oil, monosodium glutamate, salt and spices. The umami flavor component is the result of the monosodium glutamate.

== Common uses ==
- Tamago sando, an egg salad sandwich widely sold in convenience stores in Japan
- Potato salad
- Sushi
- Karaage, lightly coated deep-fried pieces of marinated meat, usually chicken
- Takoyaki, battered and cooked balls of minced octopus
- Pizza topping
- Okonomiyaki, a savory pancake made of a flour batter, shredded cabbage and a variety of other ingredients
- Spicy mayonnaise, Kewpie blended with sriracha

== Cultural significance ==
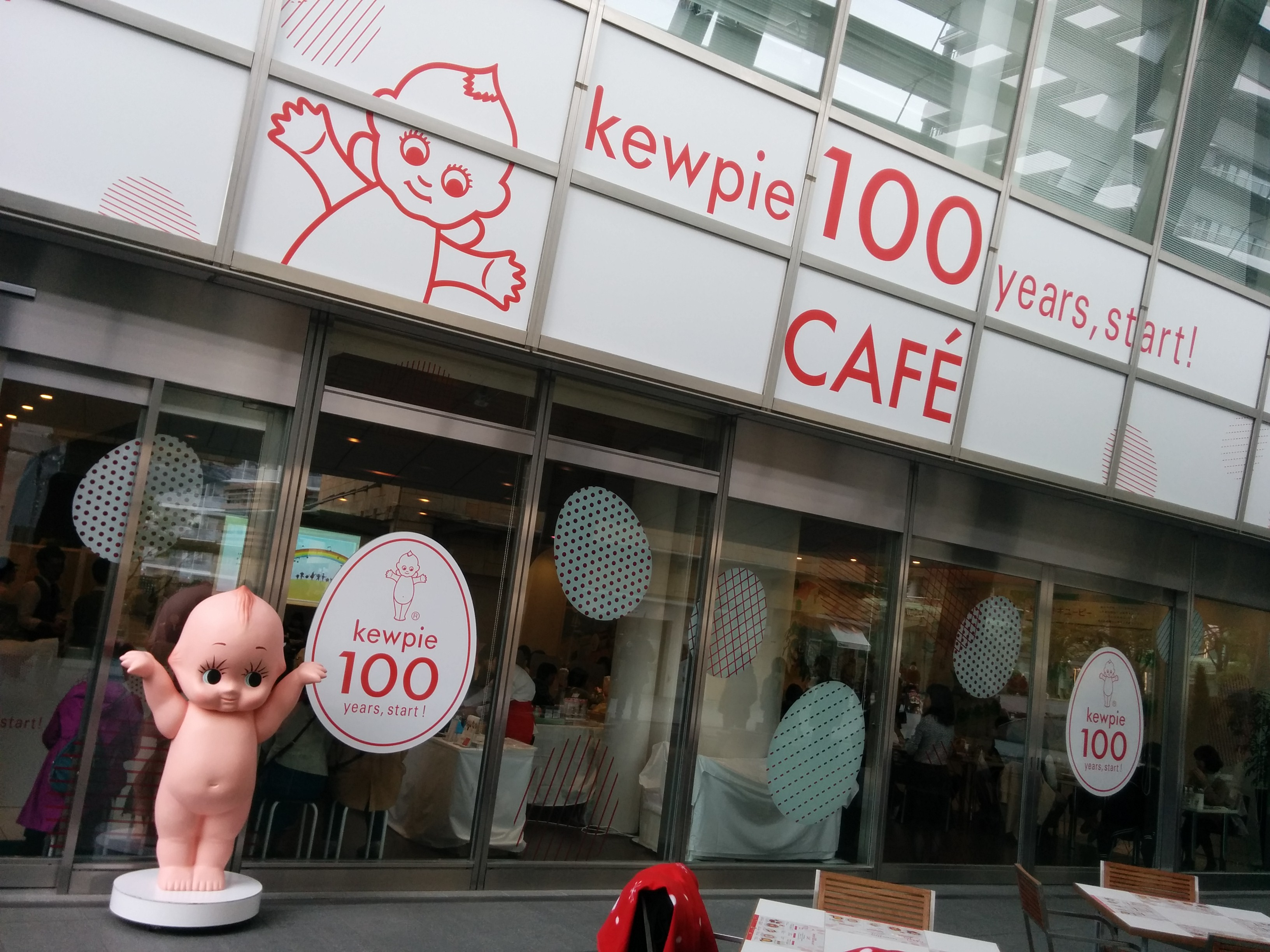
100th anniversary event in 2019

Kewpie fits into yōshoku (洋食; 'western food'), a style of Western-influenced cooking popular in Japan. The packaging is described as kawaii or cute. Kewpie is described as a "cult favorite" in Japan. According to the Los Angeles Times, "it has transcended the plane of mere human consumption to become a cultural touchstone — a passion that can border on obsession." The Japanese word マヨラー (mayora) means a person addicted to mayonnaise. The company operates a museum in Tokyo called Mayo Terrace.

== International sales ==
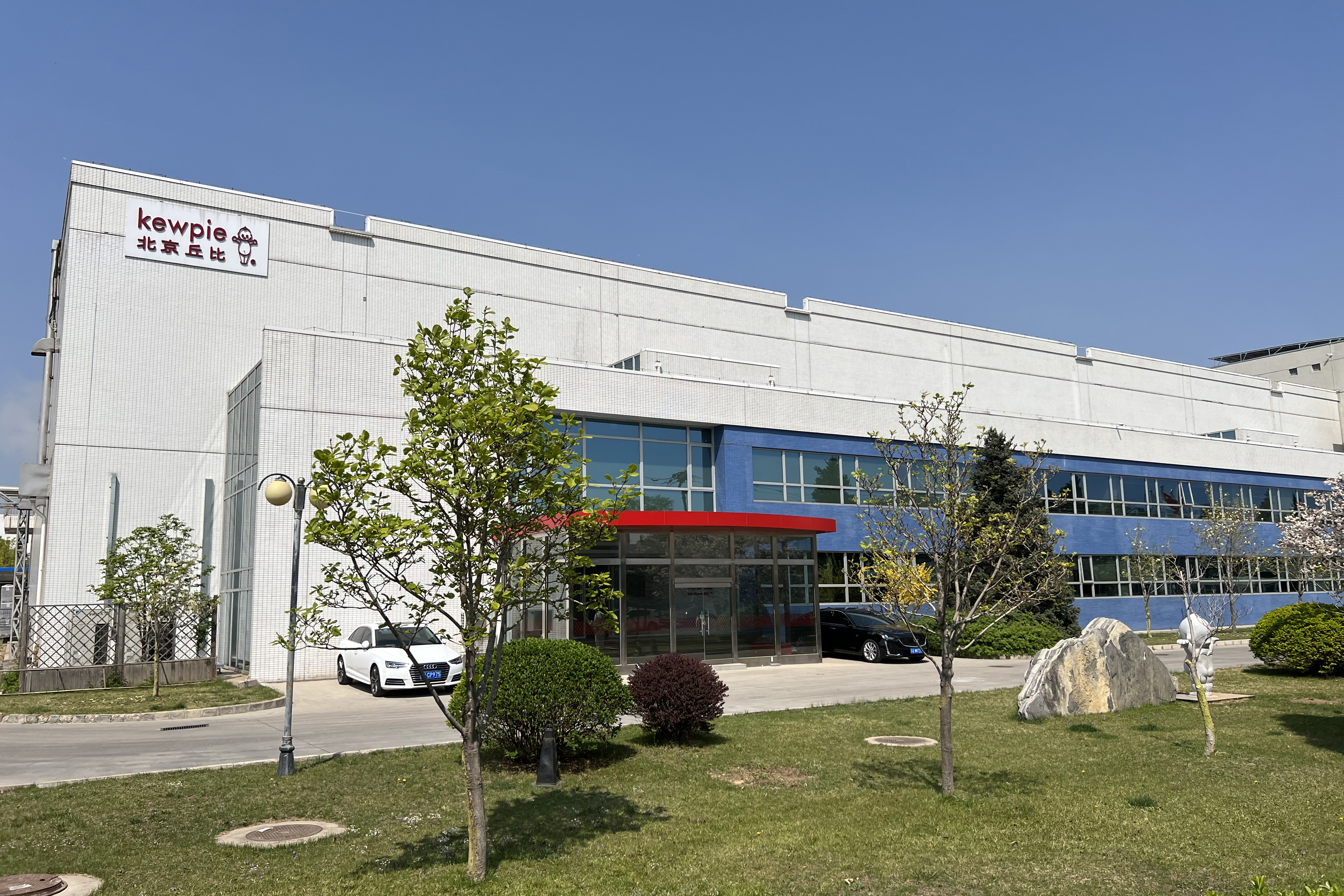
Kewpie Beijing factory in Beijing Yanqi Economic Development Area, Huairou District

Kewpie has sold its products in China since 1993, and operates three factories in China, located in Beijing, Hangzhou and Guangzhou. These plants can produce 72,000 tons of mayonnaise each year, and Kewpie is the dominant brand in several of China's largest cities. Southeast Asia is also a significant market. The company has sold its products in the United States since the early 1990s. It has a factory there that produces mayonnaise without monosodium glutamate, as well as other salad dressing and flavored sauces. Overseas sales accounted for about 9% of the company's business in 2019.

== Use by chefs ==
David Chang of Momofuku has described Kewpie as "the best mayonnaise in the world". Jason Halverson, formerly of Stones Throw in San Francisco, stated that “Kewpie Mayonnaise is like mayo on crack.”

Mari Katsumura, chef and owner of the Michelin-starred restaurant Yūgen, described the flavor of Kewpie in comparison to basic mayonnaise by saying that "the acid is a bit higher, it’s a little sweeter and the umami content is a little stronger, as well… compared to Hellman’s — Hellman’s would be a five on a scale of one to 10 in terms of flavor, while Kewpie mayo is probably like a nine out of 10 in terms of flavor."

== See also ==
- List of mayonnaises
