= Tamago Sando =

Japanese-style egg salad sandwich

Tamago sando (Japanese: 卵サンド) is Japanese-style egg salad sandwich. It is made using shokupan (Japanese milk bread) and a rich egg salad made with Kewpie mayonnaise.

Popularized in konbini run by 7-Eleven in Japan, it has subsequently made available internationally and spawned variations.

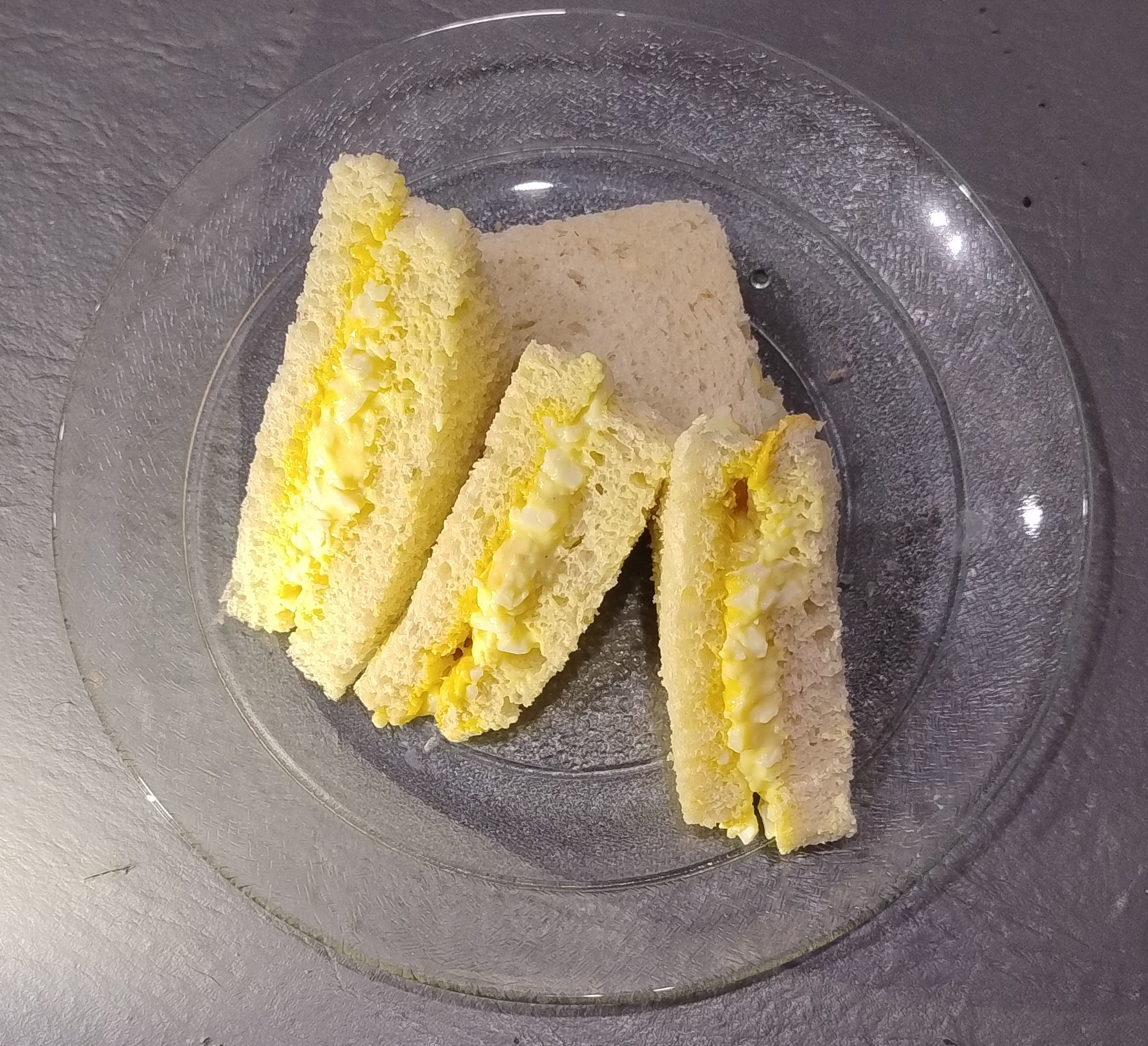
Sandwich Japonés elaborado en Argentina, adaptado a la versión original.

== Ingredients and flavor ==
Tamago sando is made with shokupan combined with creamy, yolk-colored egg salad flavored with Kewpie.

Tasting Table described tamago sando as "Japan's pure and simple take on an egg sandwich", describing its flavor as follows:

The milk bread, known as shokupan, offers a subtle sweetness, while the egg inside can vary from a rich blend of egg salad to a thick fluffy omelet to two variations of egg: egg salad plus a soft-boiled egg with a vibrant yolk in the middle. And each variant is a testament to Japan's ode to simplicity and dedication to craft and perfection. As you prepare to relish the tamago sando, you realize this sandwich is more than a convenient meal — it's a bite-sized journey into the heart of Japan's rich culinary heritage.

Tamago sando has particularly been popularized by travelers discovering it at 7-Eleven konbini stores in Japan. An article in Food & Wine recommended it as the first meal for tourists when they arrive to Japan.
