= Chivita 100% =

Juice Brand By Chi Limited

- Product type: Fruit juice in 6 variants
- Country: Nigeria
- Introduced: 1996
- Website: www.chivitajuices.com

Chivita 100% is a juice brand manufactured by Chi Limited. It was first introduced into the Nigerian market in 1996 as Chivita Premium Fruit Juice. In 2014, a rebranding initiative led to the renaming of the brand as 'Chivita 100%' to convey to consumers the authentic composition of the product.

The Chivita 100% product line offers a selection of six distinct fruity flavors.

Chivita 100% is the official beverage partner of Manchester United F.C. in Nigeria. The partnership, signed by the management of CHI Limited and Manchester United Limited allows CHI Limited to incorporate Manchester United's brand elements across Chi's products in the Nigerian market.

== Product nutritional content ==
Chivita 100% asserts that their product line is devoid of preservatives, artificial colors, and added sugars. Chivita 100% designates their offering as a nutrient dense beverage.

== Campaigns ==
Chi Limited inaugurated the "Chivita 100% Juiceball" promotional campaign showcasing Manchester United footballers such as Robin van Persie, Ángel Di María, Marouane Fellaini, Antonio Valencia, Radamel Falcao and Jonny Evans.

== In popular culture ==
As part of the "Buy Naija to grow the Naira" campaign launched on social media, the Senator and Chairman of the Silverbird Group, Ben Murray Bruce, stated in a tweet that Chivita juice (Chivita 100%) is as good as imported juice.

== Awards ==
Award	Year	Organization	Ref.
Outstanding Juice Brand in Nigeria	2016	Marketing Edge Brands and Advertising Excellence awards	
Africa's Best Quality Juice Brand	2014	Africa Quality Achievement Award, Africa Quality Institute (AQI) in collaboration with IBMN Integrated Services	
Most Preferred Juice Brand	2013	Generation Next Survey Awards in partnership with BusinessDay and HDI Youth Marketers	
