= Beijing Yanqi Economic Development Area =

Beijing Yanqi Economic Development Area 北京雁栖经济开发区
- Analogous Township-level Unit
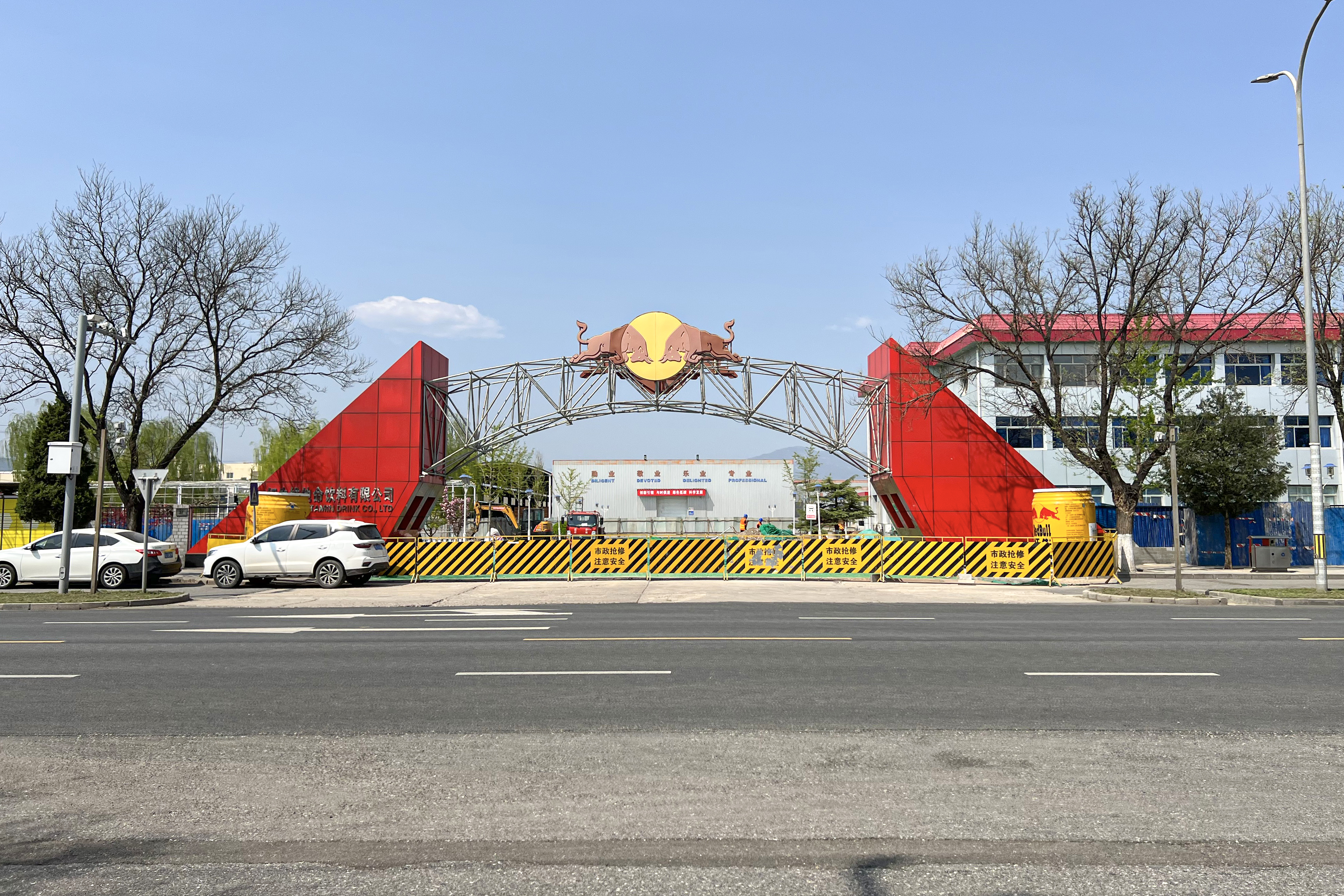
- Red Bull Beijing Factory within the area, 2022

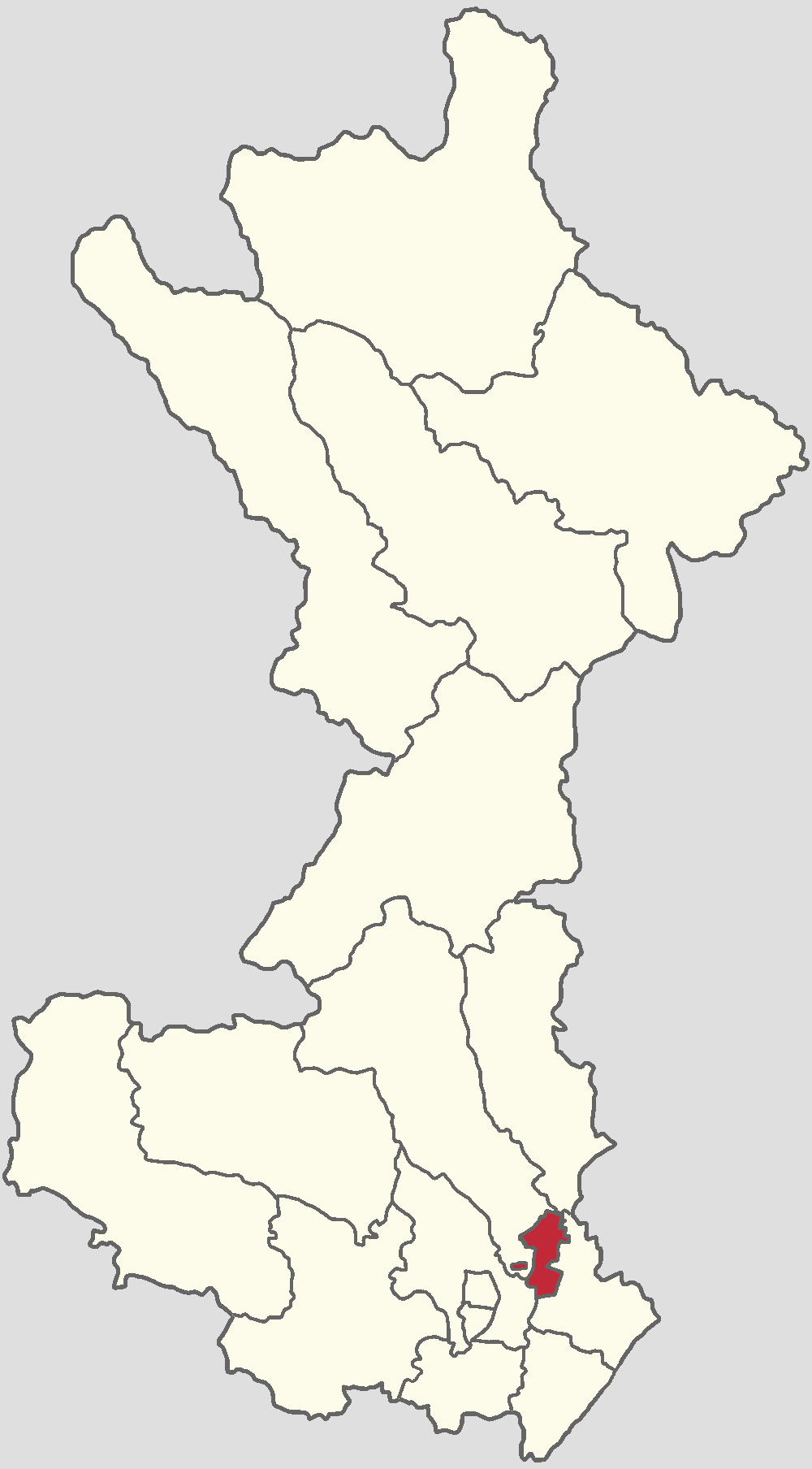
- Location of the economic development area inside of Huairou District

- Location within Beijing Location within China
- Coordinates: 40°20′33″N 116°41′04″E
- Country: China
- Municipality: Beijing
- District: Huairou

Area
  - Total: 15.04 km^{2} (5.81 sq mi)

Population (2020)
  - Total: 3,261
  - Density: 216.8/km^{2} (561.6/sq mi)
- Time zone: UTC+8 (China Standard)
- Area code: 010

Beijing Yanqi Economic Development Area (simplified Chinese: 北京雁栖经济开发区; traditional Chinese: 北京雁棲經濟開發區; pinyin: Běijīng Yànqī Jīngjì Kāifāqū) is a municipality-level economic development area located entirely within Yanqi Town, Huairou District, Beijing, China. In 2020, it had a total population of 3,261.

== History ==
The area was established in 1992 in a region 5 km northeast of the urban center of Huairou. In 2000 it became a municipality-level industrial development area.

== Gallery ==
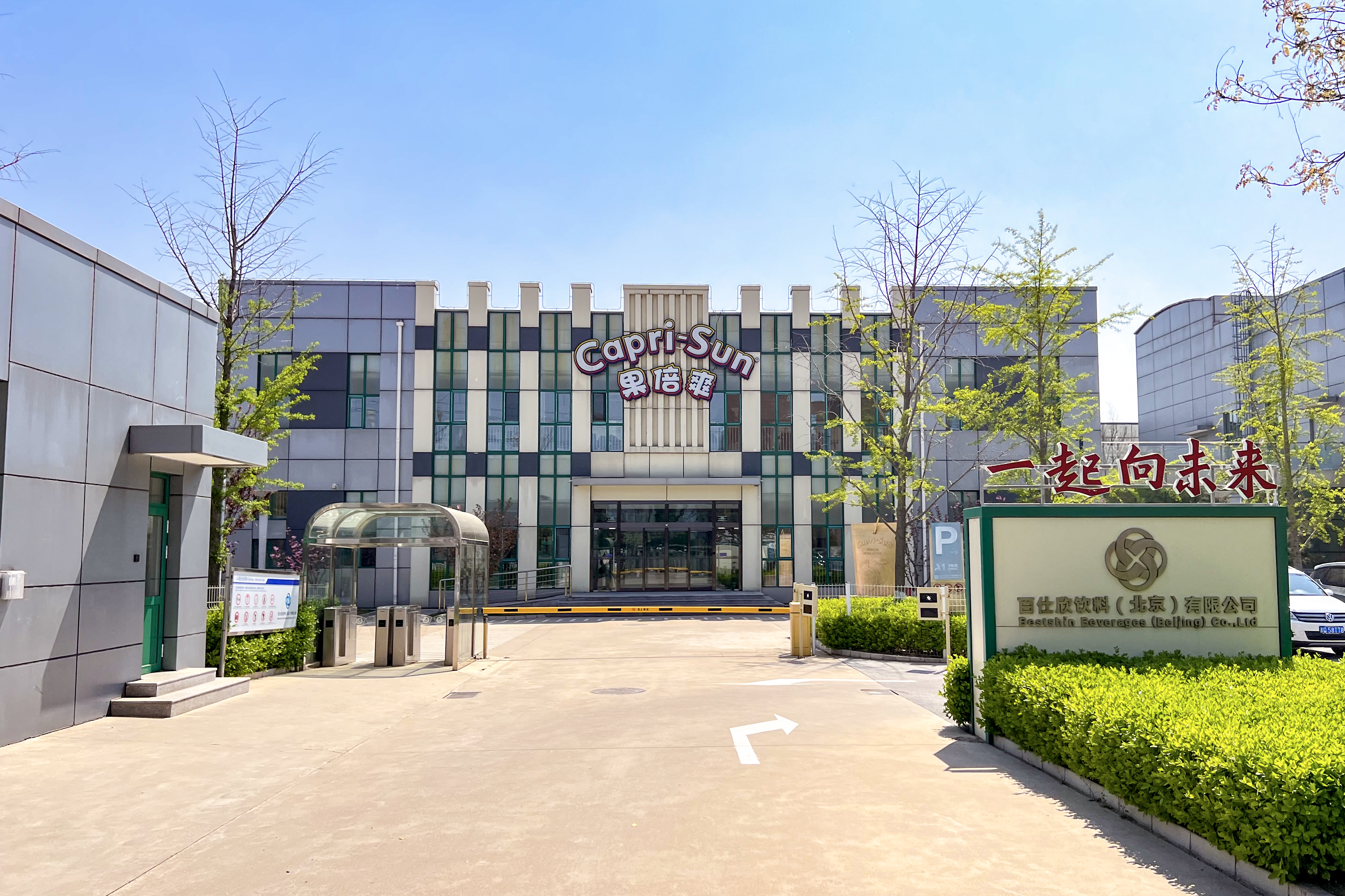
Capri-Sun China headquarters, 2022

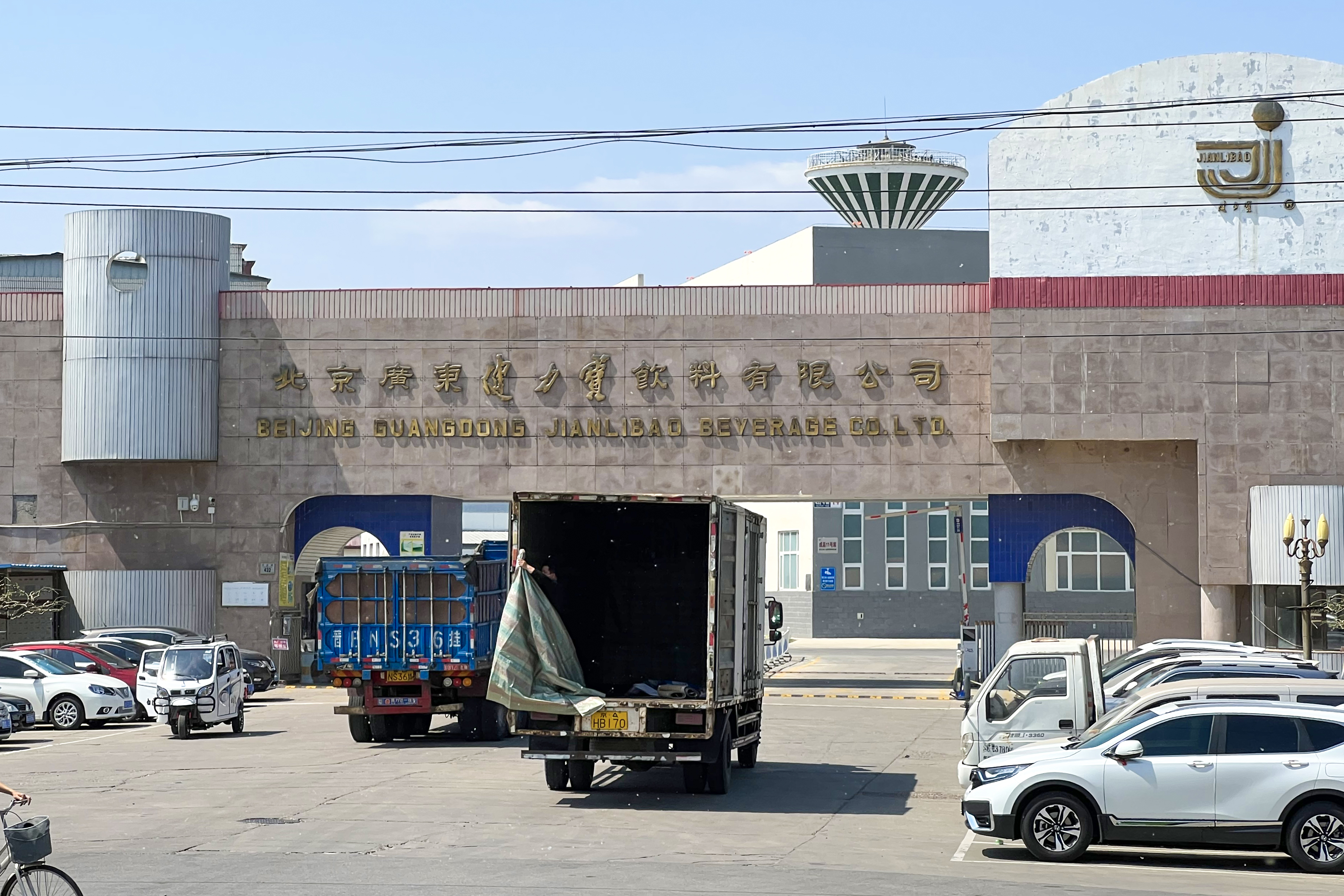
HQ of Jianlibao Beverage, 2022

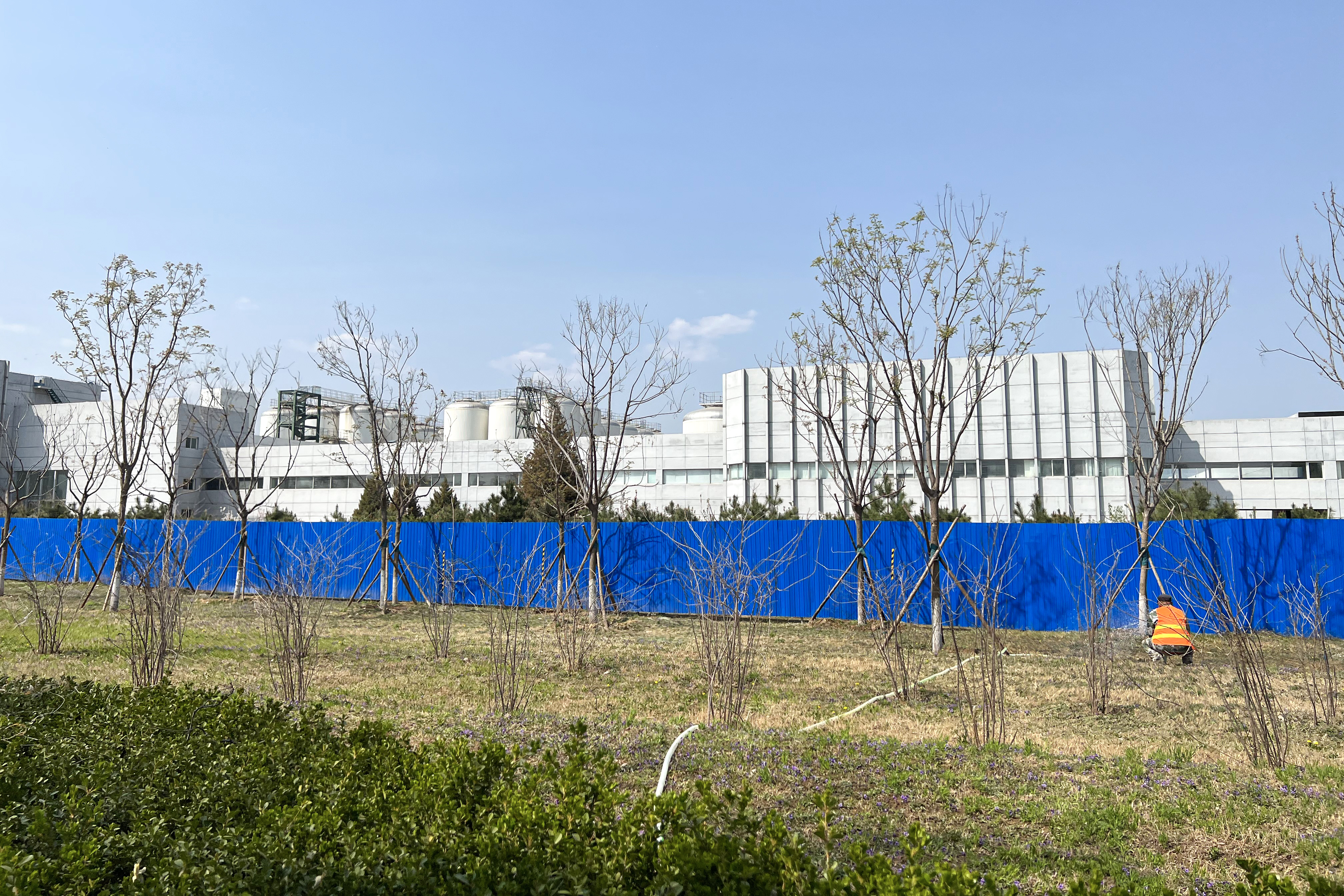
Beijing HQ of Beijing Beer Asahi, 2022

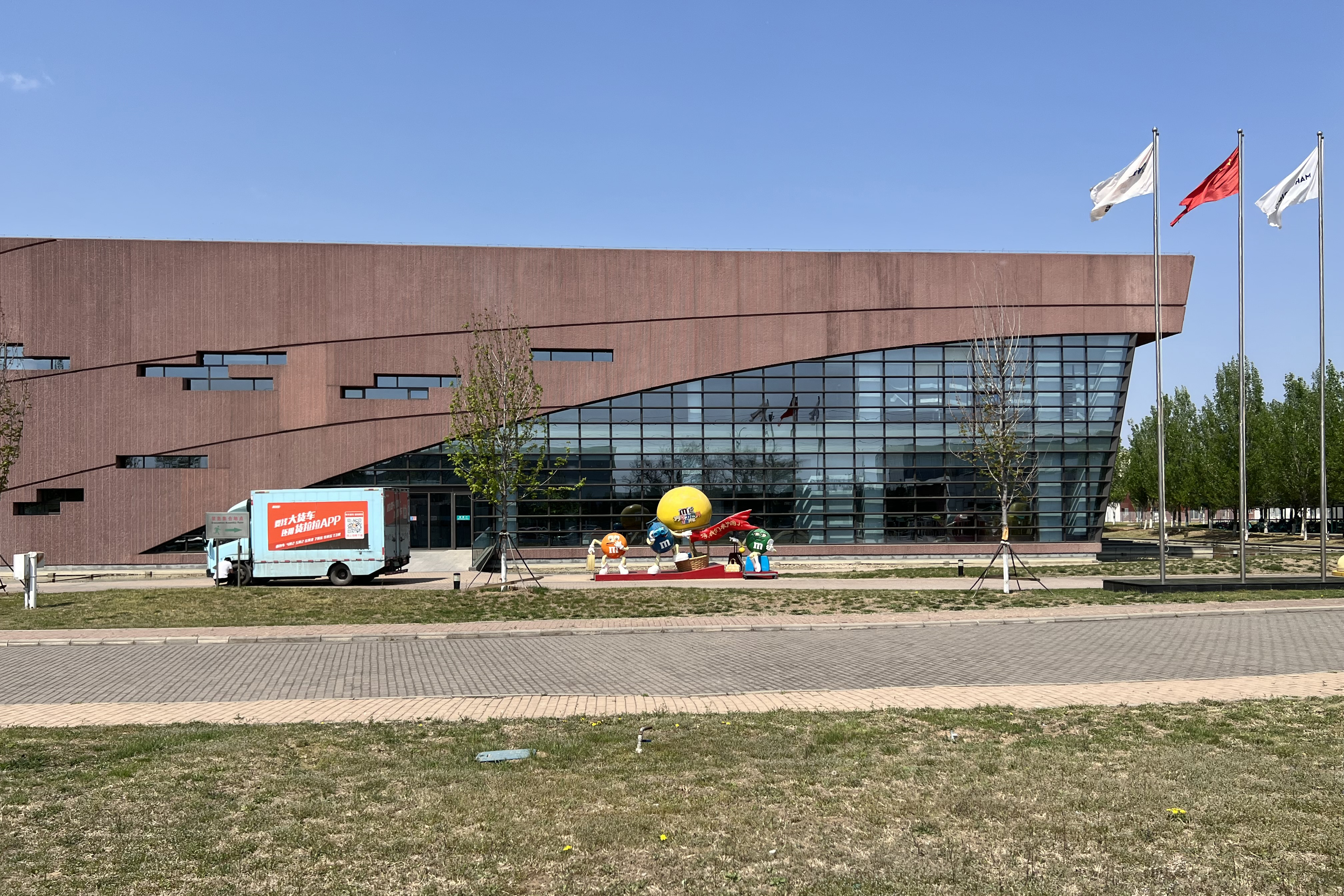
Beijing HQ of Mars Foods, 2022

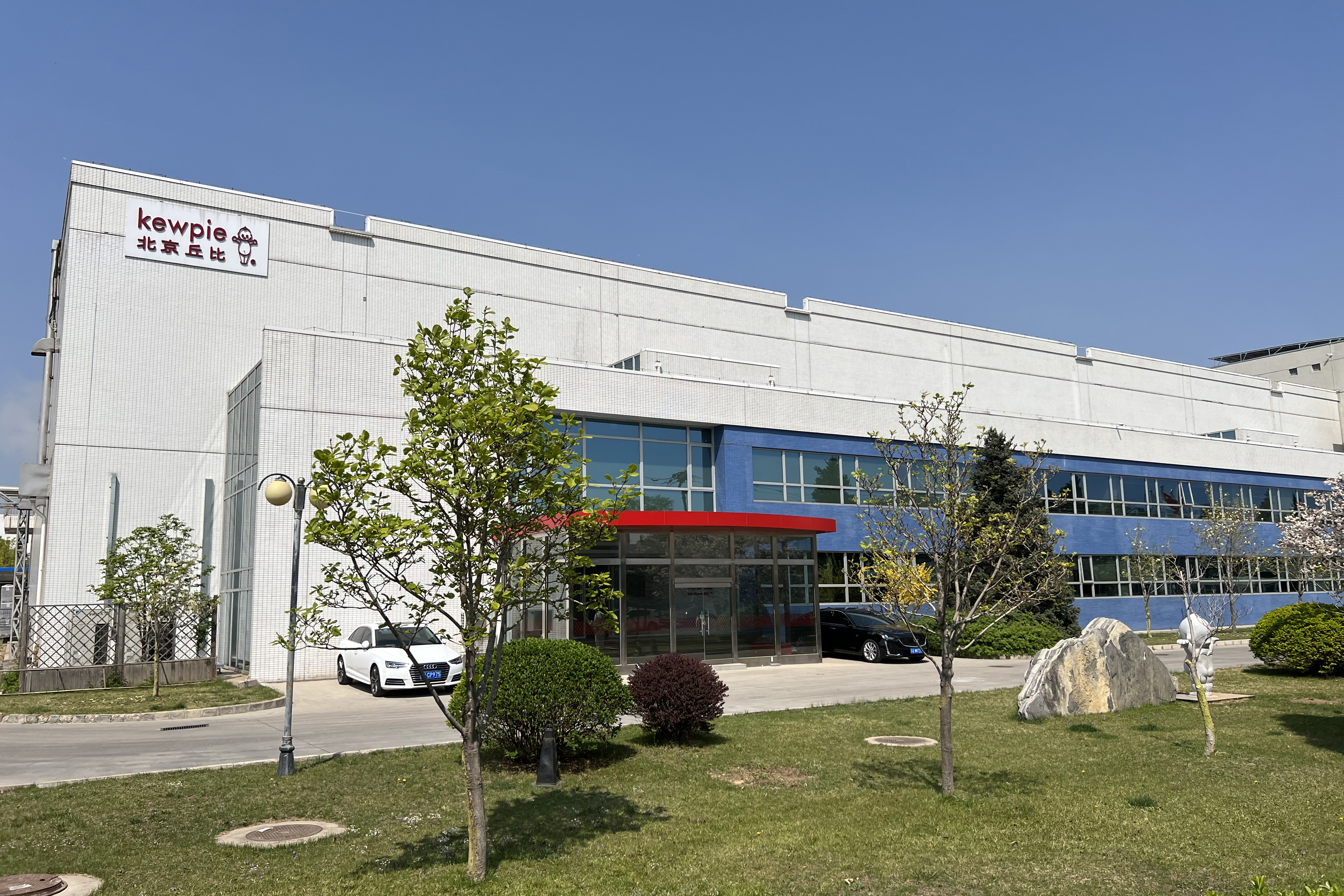
Beijing division of Kewpie Corporation, 2022
