= Wild (food company) =

German food company

Wild & Co. KG
- Company type: Subsidiary
- Industry: Food products
- Founded: 1931; 95 years ago, in Heidelberg
- Headquarters: Eppelheim, Germany
- Owner: Archer Daniels Midland
- Number of employees: 2,500
- Subsidiaries: Wild Flavors
- Website: www.wildflavors.com

Rudolf Wild & Co. is a food company headquartered in Eppelheim, near Heidelberg, Germany.

The company produces natural ingredients for food products. WILD has around 2,500 employees in over 70 countries, 1,400 of whom are employed at the main plant in Eppelheim. The company is based on three core businesses: the production of ingredients for the food and beverage industry, the construction of processing equipment and machinery (WILD INDAG) and the production and sale of its own brand products and end products. One of the latter, Capri-Sun, is sold in over 100 countries.

== History ==
The company was founded as Zick-Zack Werk Rudolf Wild by Rudolf Wild in 1931 in Heidelberg. The company was relocated to the neighboring town of Eppelheim 6 years later. In 1956, Wild acquired the Hamburg-based SiSi-Werke, which had been one of the most important producers of essences in Germany before the war and began producing and selling Capri-Sun in 1969. In the 1970s, Wild expanded his business into other countries, primarily Switzerland and the United States. WILD has since developed into a global group under the management of Hans-Peter Wild.

== Literature ==
Hans-Peter Wild: Capri-Sonne. Die Faszination einer Weltmarke. (Capri-Sun. The fascination of a global brand), Frankfurter Allgemeine Buch, Frankfurt am Main 2001, ISBN 3-89843-036-7
