= Libella =

German soft drink brand

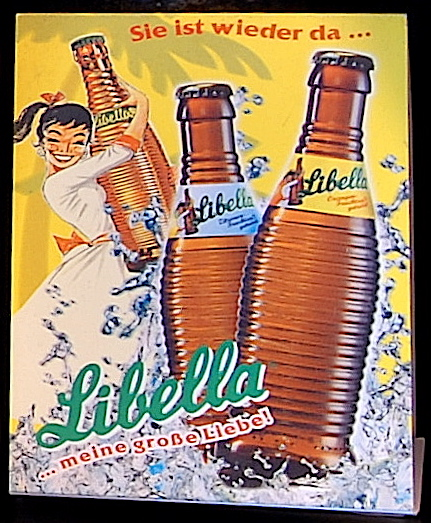
Libella advertisement (in German)

Libella is a soft drink that was widely consumed in Germany in the 1950s and 1960s. It was developed by Rudolf Wild, an entrepreneur from Heidelberg who sought to make a fruit-favored drink without artificial ingredients. The bottles were notable for their molded grooves and for their yellow-and-green logo printed directly on the bottle.

The Libella brand still exists, and also currently [when?] offers a cola product as well.

The name is vaguely similar to the German word "Libelle" which means "Dragonfly" in English.

== See also ==
- Bluna
- Sinalco
