= Chi Limited =

Nigerian fast-moving consumer goods company

Chivita|Hollandia (CHI Limited)
- Industry: Consumer Goods
- Founded: 1980; 46 years ago
- Headquarters: Lagos, Nigeria
- Key people: Folasope Aiyesimoju (Chairman)
- Products: Juices and Nectars, Milk and Yogurt Drinks and Snack Foods
- Owner: UAC of Nigeria Plc (UAC)
- Website: www.chivitahollandia.com

Chivita|Hollandia (CHI Limited) is a Nigerian company specializing in the production of locally made, high-quality food and beverage products. Founded in 1980, it has become a leader in the fruit juice, dairy, and snack categories, meeting consumer needs in Nigeria and across Africa.

It is also recognized for its workplace culture, earning the Great Place To Work certification in 2023 and a gold rated recertification in 2024.

In September 2025, UAC of Nigeria Plc (UAC) completed the purchase of CHI Limited.

== Key Facts ==
- Chivita and Hollandia are the company’s flagship brands, holding market leadership positions in Nigeria's fruit juice and dairy sectors.
- Chivita|Hollandia (CHI Limited) operates the largest production site with aseptic beverage packaging in Sub-Saharan Africa.
- The company launched Nigeria's first lactose-free milk, catering to the lactose-intolerant population.
- Capri-Sun, the globally recognized children’s fruit drink, was its pioneering product in the Nigerian market. Chivita|Hollandia (CHI Limited) remains a long-term partner in producing and distributing Capri-Sun.

== History ==
1980s

- 1980: Chivita|Hollandia (CHI Limited) was incorporated.
- 1982: The company launched Capri-Sonne (later renamed Capri-Sun) in Nigeria, offering four flavors. Nigeria has since grown to become the second-largest global market for Capri-Sun.

1990s

- 1997: The company created and launched its own juice brand, Chivita.
- 1998: The first Tetra Pak production line was installed, and Chivita was introduced in 1L aseptic packaging. Over the years, the brand expanded its flavor offerings.

2000s

- 2005: The company entered the value-added dairy market by creating the drinking yogurt category and launching evaporated milk in aseptic packaging under the Hollandia brand.
- 2009–2010: The Chivita portfolio was expanded with the introduction of Chivita Ice Tea, Chivita Active, and Chivita Happy Hour.

2010s

- 2019: The company launched Nigeria's first lactose-free milk.

2020s

- 2020: Chivita|Hollandia (CHI Limited) began producing Chivita beverages in cans.
- 2022: The company introduced the Chivita Smart Malt Drink.
- 2023: A portfolio revitalization of the Chivita and Hollandia brands was undertaken.

== See also ==
- Chivita Juices
- Hollandia Dairy
- Capri-Sonne
