= Hans-Peter Wild =

German-Swiss businessman (born 1941)

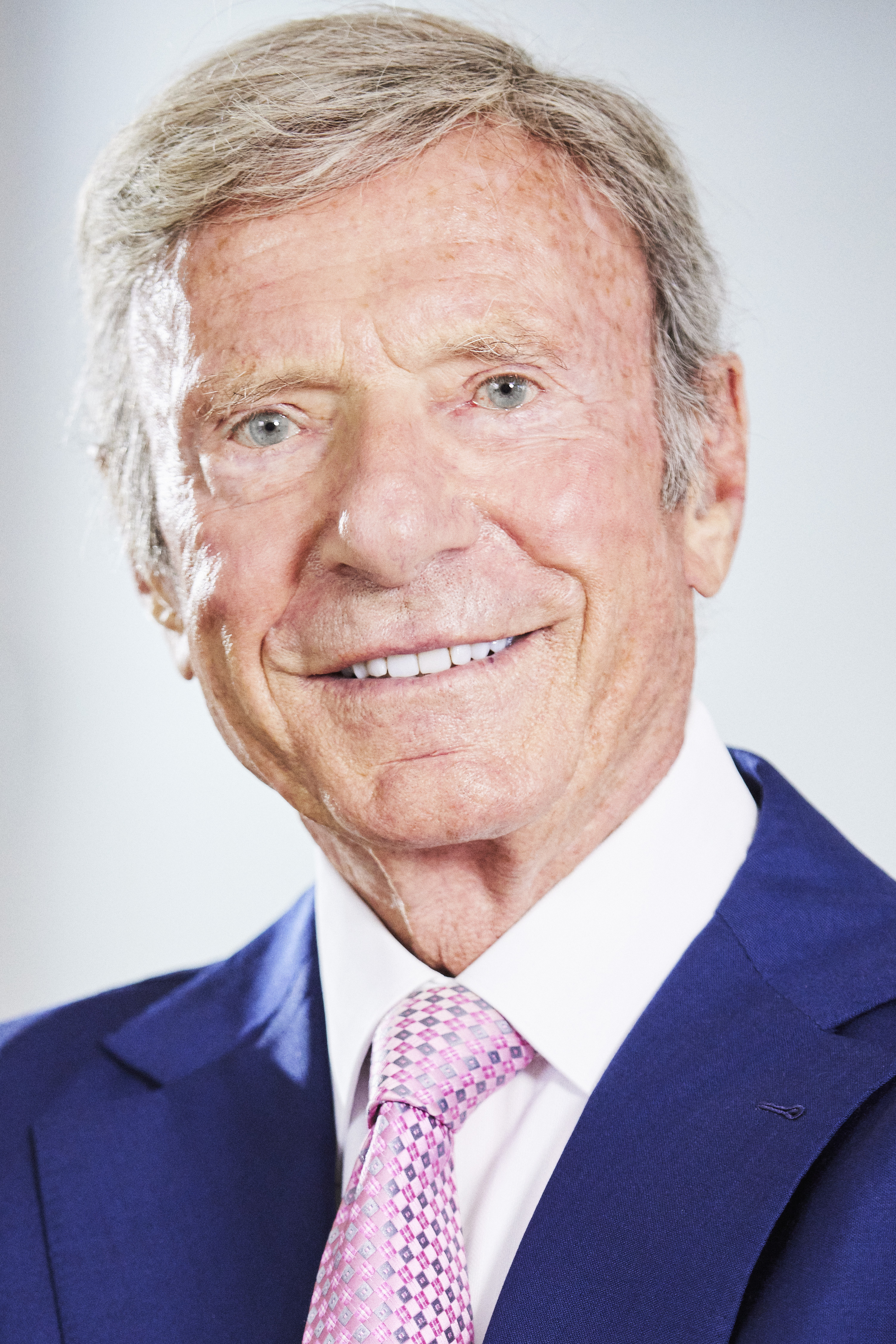
- Wild in 2023
- Born: 16 June 1941 (age 85); Heidelberg, Germany
- Education: University of Mannheim
- Occupation: Businessman

Hans-Peter Wild (born 16 June 1941) is a German-born Swiss businessman and lawyer. Wild is the owner and chairman of Capri-Sun a fruit juice manufacturer based in Zug, Switzerland. Until 2014, he was the majority shareholder in the company Wild Flavors, one of the leading manufacturers of natural flavours for the food industry. Hans-Peter Wild lives in Zug with his wife, Christine E. Drage, now Mrs. Christine Wild, also a lawyer, and is one of the richest people in Switzerland.

== Biography ==
Hans-Peter Wild, the son of Rudolf Wild and Leonie Wild, was born in Heidelberg in 1941.

He passed the first state examination as a lawyer in Heidelberg with distinction. He completed a degree in business studies in Mannheim, majoring in fiscal law and auditing, and earned an MBA. He spent two years studying at the Sorbonne in Paris and at the University of Cambridge before completing a PhD entitled “The market-dominating company under French law” at the Faculty of Law at the University of Mannheim.

After graduation, he worked for the Bremen family business Diersch & Schröder for four years as managing director, being responsible for the company's mineral oil, chemistry, and shipping activities.

== Entrepreneurial activity ==
In 1974, he joined his parents’ company, Wild. Hans-Peter Wild continued the international expansion of the company forming two global businesses: Wild Flavors and Capri-Sun. In 1979, he signed boxing world champion Muhammad Ali as an advertising ambassador, transforming the originally German company into an international corporation.

In preparation for the possible listing of the flavourings division on the stock exchange, in 2010, Hans-Peter Wild sold a minority share of 35% in Rudolf Wild GmbH & Co. KG to the financial investor Kohlberg Kravis Roberts & Co. (KKR). With effect as of the end of 2014, Wild and KKR sold the by then Swiss parent company Wild Flavors to the US group Archer Daniels Midland. Not included in this deal were all Capri-Sun companies and the Eppelheim-based mechanical engineering company Indag (today: Pouch Partners), Wild's technology subsidiary that produces, among other things, filling and packaging machines for Capri-Sun and other pouches like petfood. These companies remained in Wild's ownership.

Via the family office, Wild Group Management, in Zug, Hans-Peter Wild controls numerous other direct company holdings in the areas of biotechnology and disruptive technologies, In addition to his industrial holdings, Wild also owns the two luxury hotels in Salzburg: Goldener Hirsch and Schloss Mönchstein.

== Commitment ==
=== Social and culture ===
Wild is president of the “Leonie Wild Charitable Foundation”, which he initiated together with his mother in 1997. The foundation helps citizens in need and is involved in social and cultural projects, particularly in the Eppelheim and in the Rhine-Neckar region. In 2016, Hans-Peter Wild donated US$16.5 million to the Marine Corps Scholarship Foundation in recognition of the contribution of the US military during World War II and in appreciation of the liberation of Germany from the Nazis.

=== Music ===
Hans-Peter Wild is a patron of the Astona Summer Music Academy, which offers talented young musicians from various countries the opportunity every year to make music under the guidance of renowned teaching staff, and perfect their instrumental skills. He also supports the Salzburg Festival and is a member of the board of trustees of the Heidelberger Frühling foundation, which holds an annual international music festival and also offers a mentoring scheme for talented young musicians. In 2023, it was announced that he would be donating €12 million for a new festival center on Herbert-von-Karajan-Platz. This is the largest donation ever made by a private patron in the history of the Salzburg Festival.

=== Science and medicine ===
In the area of science promotion, Hans-Peter Wild supports the universities of Heidelberg and Mannheim, as well as the University Hospital of Zürich and the Johns Hopkins Hospital. The EU Human Brain Project, launched in 2013, is intended to improve understanding of brain structures and functions with the aid of artificial intelligence. The Heidelberg scholarship programme Hans-Peter Wild Talent Scholarship is oriented towards young people in the STEM fields of study. In Mannheim, Wild financed a programme together with the university foundation that hopes to attract new scientific talent. In the area of intensive medicine, the University Hospital of Zürich is working on various projects that are financed via donations from Hans-Peter Wild.

In 2001, Hans-Peter Wild endowed Wild Chair for Family Business at the International Institute for Management Development (IMD), the private business school in Lausanne.

=== Sport ===
In 1980, Hans-Peter Wild acquired a cycling team from the Belgian ice cream manufacturer Ijsboerke and renamed it Capri Sun – Koga Miyata. The cycling team was disbanded in 1982.

In 2007, he established the charitable Wild Rugby Academy foundation for promoting rugby in Germany, with the aim of raising German rugby to a world-class level. In addition to promoting youth rugby, Hans-Peter Wild also focused on supporting the national rugby team. In sporting terms, through the support of the Wild Rugby Academy, he managed to bring the men's national team almost as far as qualification for the Rugby World Cup. However, he terminated his collaboration with the German Rugby Federation in 2017 as he found their organisational structures insufficiently professional to achieve success on an international scale. In order to better understand professional structures in rugby and due to his affinity with his former university town, he acquired the renowned top-league French rugby club Stade Français Paris from the French entrepreneur Thomas Savare. He has been the club's Président du Conseil d’Administration since 2019.

== Awards ==
Wild has been honorary senator of Heidelberg University since 1996, and in 2004, he received the Bayerischer Bierorden (Bavarian Beer Award). The town of Eppelheim made him an honorary citizen in June 2006 for his entrepreneurial achievements and his many years of commitment to the employees of his company and the social facilities in Eppelheim and the region. In 2021, he was also appointed honorary senator of the University of Mannheim.

== Publications ==
- Das marktbeherrschende Unternehmen im französischen Recht (The market-dominating company under French law), dissertation, Mannheim 1968.
- Capri-Sonne. Die Faszination einer Weltmarke (Capri-Sun. The fascination of a global brand), Frankfurt am Main 2001, ISBN 3898430367
- Portrait eines Global Player: Geschmack ist weltweit unsere Stärke (Portrait of a global player: taste is our strength worldwide).
