= Pediatric Obesity =

Obesity
- Discipline: Pediatrics, endocrinology, nutrition, dietetics
- Language: English
- Edited by: Michael Goran

Publication details
- Former name(s): International Journal of Pediatric Obesity
- History: 2005-present
- Publisher: Wiley-Blackwell on behalf of the International Association for the Study of Obesity
- Frequency: Bimonthly
- Open access: Hybrid
- Impact factor: 4.573 (2014)

Standard abbreviations
- ISO 4: Pediatr. Obes.

Indexing
- ISSN: 1747-7166 (print); 1747-7174 (web)
- LCCN: 2006243413
- OCLC no.: 70052838

Links
- Journal homepage; Online access

Pediatric Obesity, formerly known as International Journal of Pediatric Obesity is a peer-reviewed medical journal covering research into all aspects of obesity during childhood and adolescence. The editor-in-chief is Michael Goran (Keck School of Medicine, University of Southern California). The journal is one of three journals published by Wiley-Blackwell on behalf of the International Association for the Study of Obesity.
