= Stand-up pouch =

Type of self-standing packaging

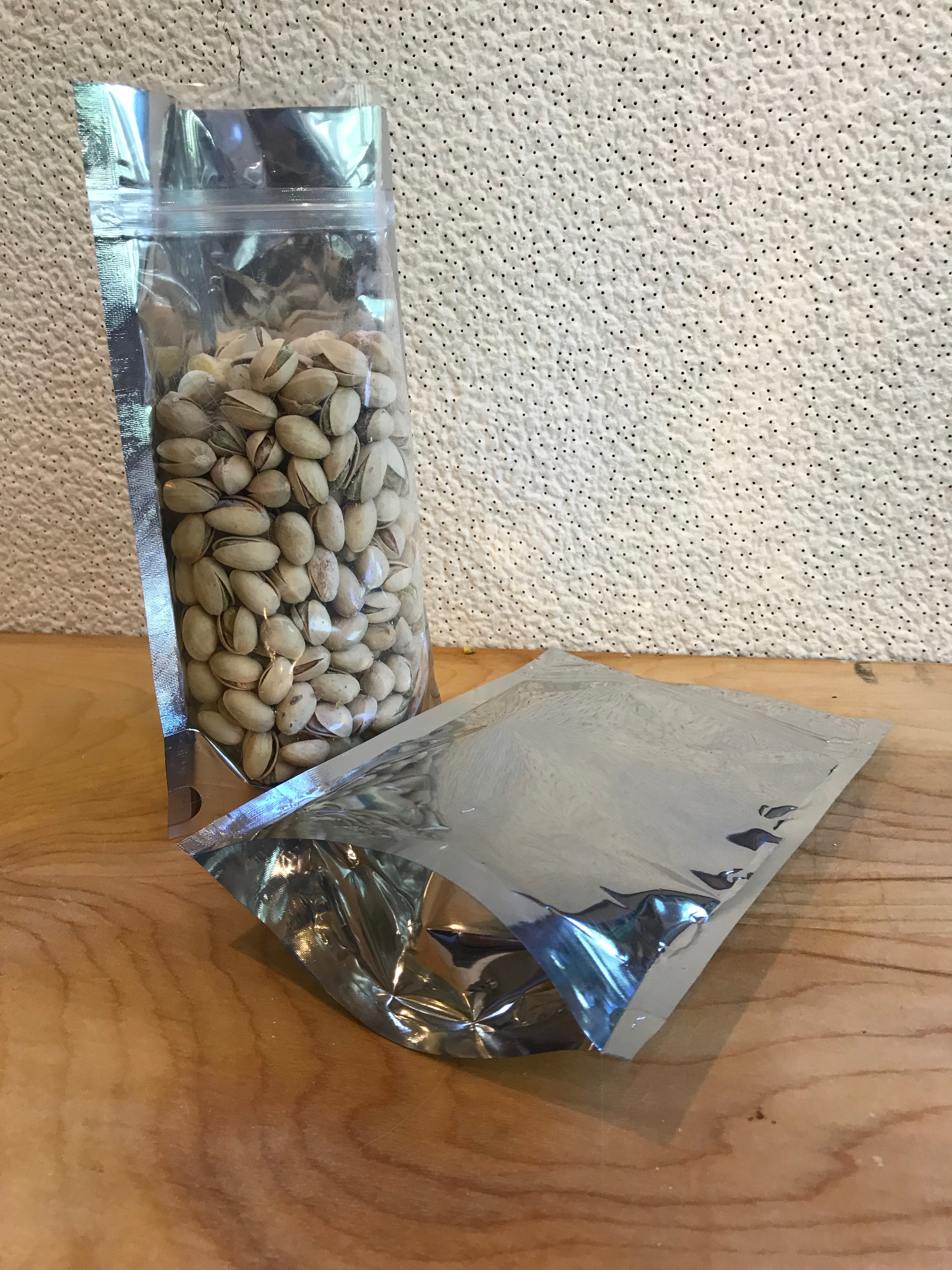
Stand-up pouch of nuts; bottom structure of pouch

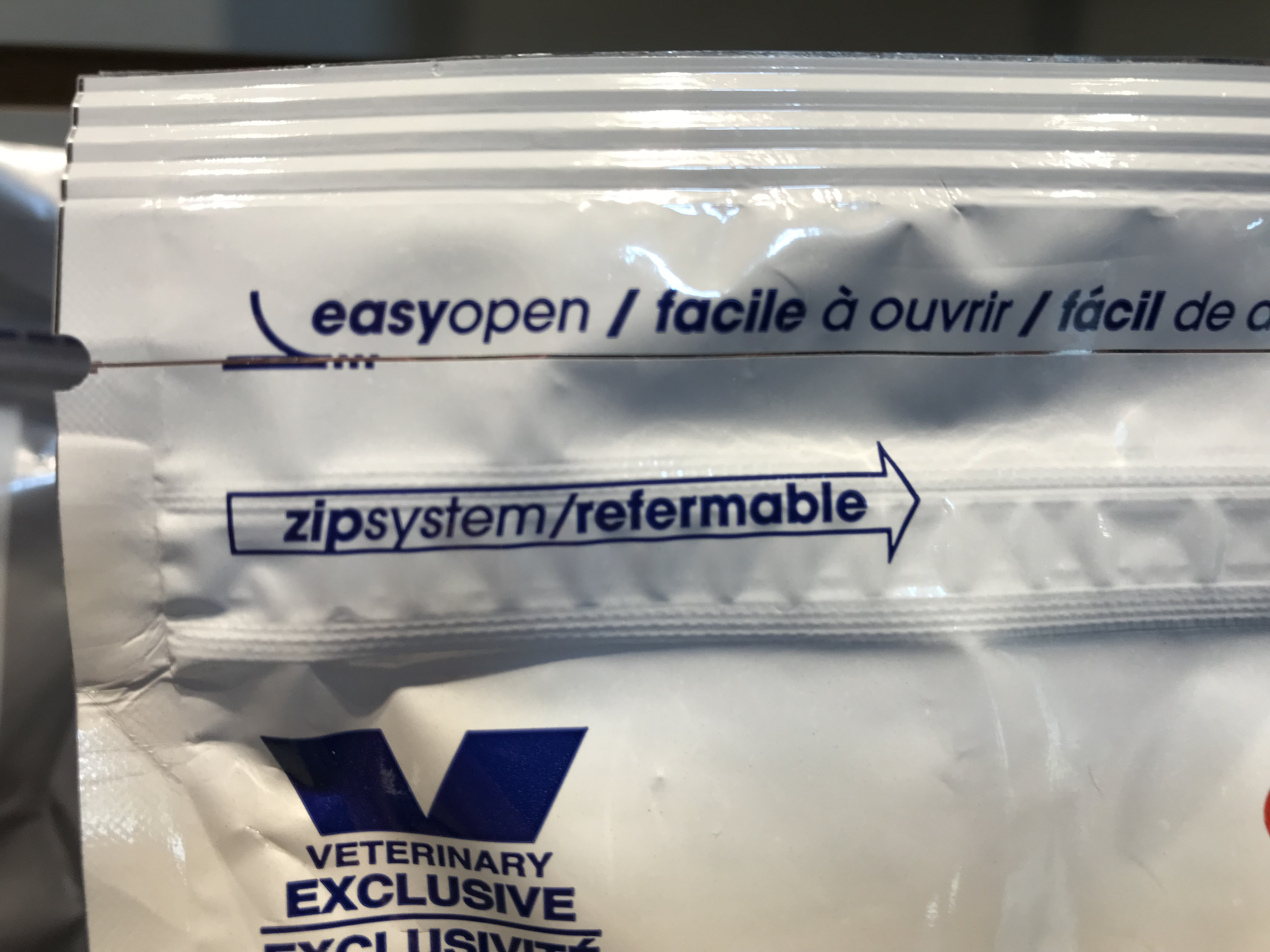
Pouch of cat treats; close-up of top seal, opening notch, and internal reclosable strip

A stand-up pouch or doypack is a type of flexible packaging that is able to stand erect on its bottom for display, storage, and convenience. It has characteristics of plastic bags, water bottles, and retort pouches. The bottom part of a stand-up pouch is gusseted to provide support for display or use.

Stand-up pouches are commonly used for food packaging. They can be aseptically filled or filled on normal packaging lines.

== History ==
Early work on stand-up pouches was conducted in France by Leon and Louis Doyen. Doyen was president of Thimonnier Company, which trademarked the name "Doypack" (from DOYen PACKaging").

Development of materials, design options, and equipment increased in the 1980s and 1990s. Development of the retort pouch was closely related. It is currently a very widely used package form.

== Construction ==
The flexible pouches are usually constructed of multi-layer materials: various plastic films, paper, foil, etc. Pouches are often printed with high-impact graphics or sometimes have attached labels. The materials must have specialized heat-seal properties to allow conversion into pouches.

The most common pouch has bottom gussets to form a "W" which opens to allow a flat bottom. Side gussets are also sometimes used. Several design options are available.

Inclusion of pour spouts and re-closable zip strips is common.

== Equipment ==
The packaging machinery involved typically forms the pouch from preprinted roll stock. The preformed pouches are shipped to a packager where they are filled and the top is sealed.

The alternative is an integral form-fill-seal machine, whether vertical or horizontal. The equipment forms the pouches, fills the pouches in-line, and seals them. With foods, drinks, or medical products, special sanitizing and wash-down requirements are critical.

The resulting equipment is sometimes complex and expensive. Packagers who do not have the volume to fill a machine to its capacity often use contract packagers.

== Bibliography ==
- Soroka, W, "Fundamentals of Packaging Technology", IoPP, 2002, ISBN 1-930268-25-4
- Yam, K. L., "Encyclopedia of Packaging Technology", John Wiley & Sons, 2009, ISBN 978-0-470-08704-6
