= Rudolf Wild =

German businessman (1904–1995)

Rudolf Wild

Rudolf Wild (25 February 1904 – 16 September 1995) was a German entrepreneur and chemist. He was the founder of WILD, a producer of natural ingredients for food products and beverages.

== Biography ==
After studying chemistry in Heidelberg, Frankfurt and Freiburg, in 1931, Rudolf Wild founded his first company – Zick Zack Werk Rudolf Wild. Starting in 1931, Wild began developing non-alcoholic beverages using natural ingredients. In 1951 he invented Libella lemonade drink. From 1966, he started developing the drink Capri-Sun.

Under his leadership, WILD developed into an international company. The company is now owned and operated by one of his sons, Hans-Peter Wild.

== Awards ==
In 1979, Rudolf Wild was named the first honorary citizen of the Eppelheim district in recognition of his services to both the citizens and the district. He was also awarded the Stauffer Medal, the highest award of the state of Baden-Württemberg, in the same year.

Rudolf Wild received the honorary medal of the Ruprecht-Karls University Heidelberg for his many years of support for the university both financially and in idea generation, and became an honorary member in 1994. The Maison Internationale des Intellectuels (M.I.D.I.) awarded Rudolf Wild the honor of Senator h. c. in 1985.

To mark his 85th birthday in 1989, Rudolf Wild was awarded the Verdienstkreuz mit Stern (Great Cross of Merit with Star) for his life's work by the then Ministerpräsident of Baden-Württemberg, Lothar Späth. The Verdienstkreuz mit Stern is the highest award issued by the Federal Republic of Germany.
