= Butter grading =

Classification of butter by quality

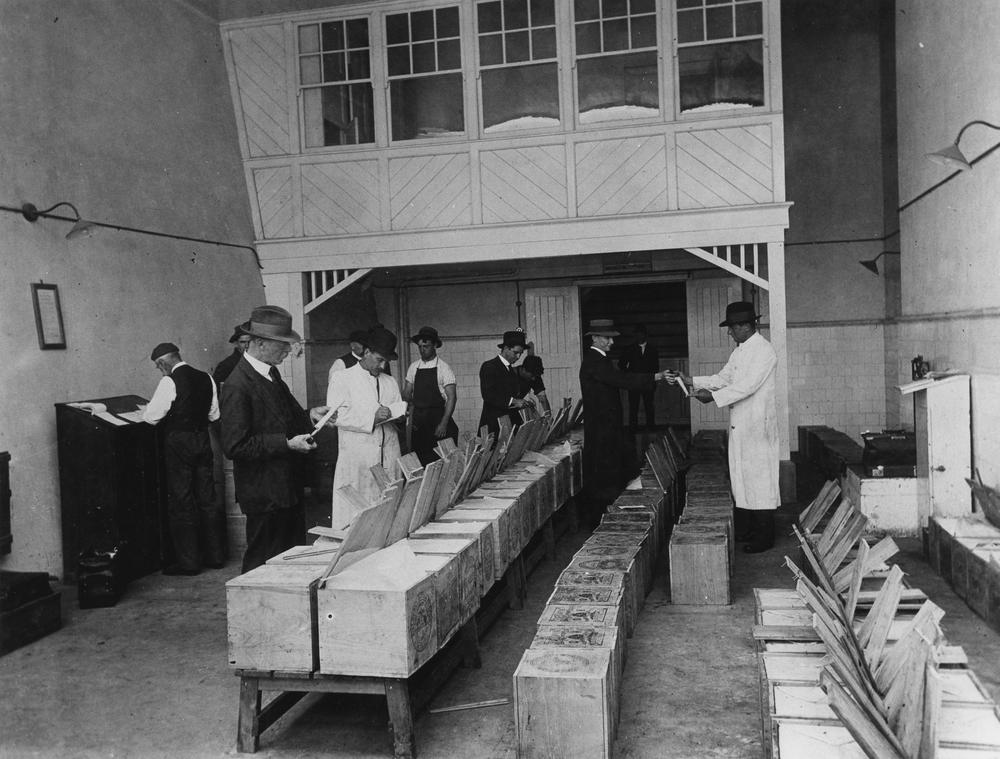
Butter grading at the railway cold stores, Roma Street, Brisbane, Australia, circa 1917

Butter grading involves the grading, inspection, assessment and sorting of butter to quantify its quality, freshness, and conformity to legal requirements.

== United States ==
Butter sold in the United States is assigned one of three letter grades; AA, A, and B. By a 1923 act of Congress, all butter sold in the United States must be composed of at least 80% milkfat. Butter is graded based on the sweetness of its flavor, the quality of cream the butter was made from, the smoothness of its texture, and the degree of flavor impurities such as acidity, bitterness, feed, malty, musty, weed, and whey. The grade indication of the butter is usually displayed in the most prominent area of the packaging, although it may also be displayed on the side or elsewhere.

When grading butter, the inspector begins with a score of 100. Each defect in flavor, texture, color, or saltiness results in a subtraction of one-half, one, or one and one-half points, depending on the characteristic and the degree of the defect, whether it is slight, definite, or pronounced. Butter that exceeds certain workmanship dis-ratings is rated on flavor only, and can not attain the highest grades.

Grade AA butter, made from sweet cream, is the highest grade of butter, has a sweet flavor, and is readily spreadable. If the butter is salted, the salt must be evenly distributed and not interfere with the smooth texture of the butter. To get this grade, the butter must achieve a score of at least 93 out of a possible 100. It is widely available at most places food products are sold. Butter graded as "AA" does not necessarily indicate the butter may meet the expectations of gourmands.

Grade A, made from fresh cream, has a stronger flavor than grade AA butter. Butter of this grade must score 92 points. It is likely to be of a coarser texture than grade AA. Like grade AA, it is widely available at food markets across the country.

Grade B butter is the lowest grade of butter available for consumer use. It is often made from sour cream. Grade B butter must score at least 90 points, anything less can not be made available to United States consumers. The texture of this grade may be crumbly, sticky, or watery. This grade of butter is usually only used in cooking, or some manufacturing processes, although many consumers will find it perfectly palatable.

In addition, all U.S. butters must pass microbiological standards.

== Canada ==
Butter, along with other dairy products, is given a grade of Canada 1, Canada 2, or Canada 3. Butter of the first grade cannot be made from cream given the second grade. Grade 3 butter is a processing grade used for product packaged and sold in bulk.

== See also ==
- Boterwet
