= Sensor-based sorting =

Use of mechanosensory systems to sort particles

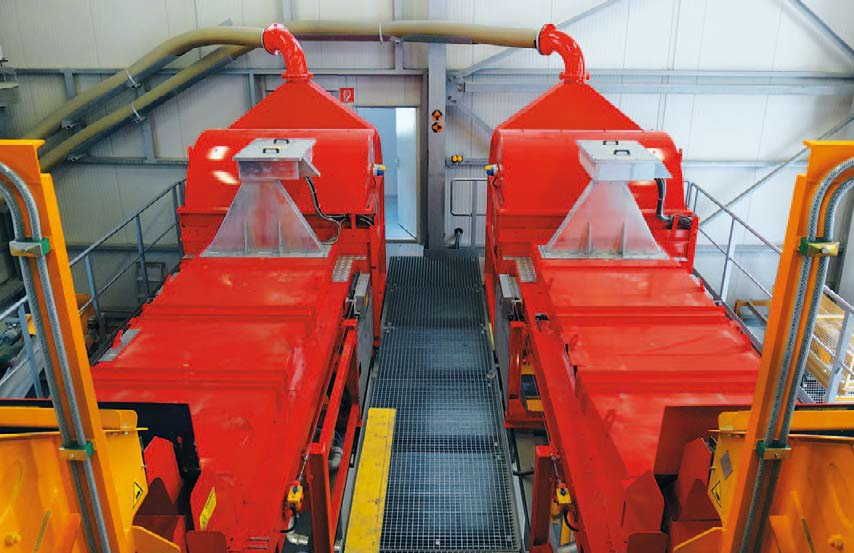
Parallel installation of two belt-type sensor-based ore sorters at Mittersill mine

In industrial automation, sensor-based sorting is an umbrella term for all applications in which particles are detected using a sensor technique and rejected by an amplified mechanical, hydraulic or pneumatic process.

The technique is generally applied in mining, recycling and food processing and used in the particle size range between 0.5 and 300 mm (0.020 and 11.811 in). Since sensor-based sorting is a single particle separation technology, the throughput is proportional to the average particle size and weight fed onto the machine.

== Functional principle of sensor-based sorting ==
The main subprocesses of sensor-based sorting are material conditioning, material presentation, detection, data processing and separation.

- Material conditioning includes all operations which prepare the particles for being detected by the sensor. All optical sensors need clean material to be able to detect optical characteristics. Conditioning includes screening and cleaning of the feed material.
- The aim of the material presentation is the isolation of the particles by creating a single particle layer with the densest surface cover possible without particles touching each other and enough distance to each other allowing for a selective detection and rejection of each single particle.

There are two types of sensor-based sorters: the chute type and the belt type. For both types the first step in acceleration is spreading out the particles by a vibrating feeder followed by either a fast belt or a chute. On the belt type the sensor usually detects the particles horizontally while they pass it on the belt. For the chute type the material detection is usually done vertically while the material passes the sensor in a free fall. The data processing is done in real time by a computer. The computer transfers the result of the data processing to an ultra fast ejection unit which, depending on the sorting decision, ejects a particle or lets it pass.

== Sensor-based ore sorting ==
Sensor-based ore sorting is the terminology used in the mining industry. It is a coarse physical coarse particle separation technology usually applied in the size range for 25–100 mm (0.98–3.94 in). Aim is either to create a lumpy product in ferrous metals, coal or industrial minerals applications or to reject waste before it enters production bottlenecks and more expensive comminution and concentration steps in the process.

In the majority of all mining processes, particles of sub-economic grade enter the traditional comminution, classification and concentration steps. If the amount of sub-economic material in the above-mentioned fraction is roughly 25% or more, there is good potential that sensor-based ore sorting is a technically and financially viable option. High added value can be achieved with relatively low capital expenditure, especially when increasing the productivity through downstream processing of higher grade feed and through increased overall recovery when rejecting deleterious waste.

=== Introduction ===
Sensor-based sorting is a coarse particle separation technology applied in mining for the dry separation of bulk materials. The functional principle does not limit the technology to any kind of segment or mineral application but makes the technical viability mainly depend on the liberation characteristics at the size range 25–100 mm (0.98–3.94 in), which is usually sorted. If physical liberation is present there is a good potential that one of the sensors available on industrial scale sorting machines can differentiate between valuable and non-valuable particles.

The separation is based on features measured with a detection technology that are used to derive a yes/no decision for actuation of usually pneumatic impulses. Sensor-based sorting is a disruptive technology in the mining industry which is universally applicable for all commodities. A comprehensive study examines both the technology's potential and its limitations, whilst providing a framework for application development and evaluation. All relevant aspects, from sampling to plant design and integration into mining and mineral processing systems, are covered. Other terminologies used in the industry include ore sorting, automated sorting, electronic sorting, and optical sorting.

=== Definition ===
Sensor-based sorting has been introduced by Wotruba and Harbeck as an umbrella term for all applications where particles are singularly detected by a sensor technique and then rejected by an amplified mechanical, hydraulic or pneumatic process.

=== Liberation characteristics ===
As for any other physical separation process, liberation is pre-requisite for possible separation. Liberation characteristics are well known and relatively easy to study for particulate lots in smaller size ranges, e.g. flotation feed and products. The analysis is essential for understanding the possible results of physical separation and relatively easy to conduct in laboratory on a couple of dozens of grams of sample which can be studied using optical methods or such as the QEMSCAN.

For larger particles above 10 mm (0.39 in) it is widely known for applications that are treated using density separation methods, such as coal or iron ore. Here, the washability analysis can be conducted on sample masses up to 10 tonnes in equipped laboratories. For sensor-based sorting, where laboratory methods can only tell about the liberation characteristics where the describing feature is the density (e.g. iron ore, coal), hand counting, single-particle tests and bulk tests can reveal the liberation characteristics of a bulk material: Hereby, only single particle tests reveal the true liberation, while hand counting and bulk testing give a result which also incorporates the separation efficiency of the type of analysis. More information on the testing procedures used in technical feasibility evaluation can be found in the respective chapter.

=== Historical development ===
The oldest form of mineral processing practiced since the Stone Age is hand-picking. Georgius Agricola also describes hand-picking is his book De re metallica in 1556. Sensor-based sorting is the automation and extension to hand picking. In addition to sensors that measure visible differences like color (and the further interpretation of the data regarding texture and shape), other sensors are available on industrial scale sorters that are able to measure differences invisible for the human eye (EM, XRT, NIR).

The principles of the technology and the first machinery has been developed since the 1920s (. Nevertheless, widely applied and standard technology it is only in the industrial minerals and gemstone segments. Mining is benefiting from the step change developments in sensing and computing technologies and from machine development in the recycling and food processing industries.

In 2002, Cutmore and Eberhard stated that the relatively small installed base of sensor-based sorters in mining is more a result of insufficient industry interest than any technical barriers to their effective use Nowadays sensor-based sorting is beginning to reveal its potential in various applications in basically all segments of mineral production (industrial minerals, gemstones, base-metals, precious metals, ferrous metals, fuel). Precondition is physical liberation in coarse size ranges (~10–300 mm (0.39–11.81 in)) to make physical separation possible. Either the product fraction, but more often the waste fraction needs to be liberated. If liberation is present, there is good potential that one of available detection technologies on today's sensor-based sorters can positively or negatively identify one of the two desired fractions.

=== Feed preparation ===
A size range coefficient of approximately three is advisable. A minimum amount of undersized fine material must enter the machines to optimize availability. Moisture of the feed is not important, if the material is sufficiently dewatered and the undersize fraction is efficiently removed. For surface detection technologies sometimes spray water on the classifying screen is required to clean the surfaces. Surface detection technologies would otherwise measure the reflectance of the adhesions on the surface and a correlation to the particle's content is not given.

=== Main machine types ===
During the more than 80 years of technical development of sensor-based ore sorting equipment, various types of machines have been developed. This includes the channel-type, bucket-wheel type and cone type sorters. The main machine types being installed in the mining industry today are belt-type and chute-type machines. Harbeck made a good comparison of both disadvantages and advantages of the systems for different sorting applications. The selection of a machine-type for an application depends various case-dependent factors, including the detection system applied, particle size, moisture, yield amongst others.

==== Chute-type machine ====
The chute-type machine has a lower footprint and fewer moving parts which results in lower investment and operating costs. In general, it is more applicable to well liberated material and surface detection, because a double sided scanning is possible on a more reliable on the system. The applicable top size of the chute-type machine is bigger, as material handling of particles up to 300 mm (12 in) is only technically viable on this setup.

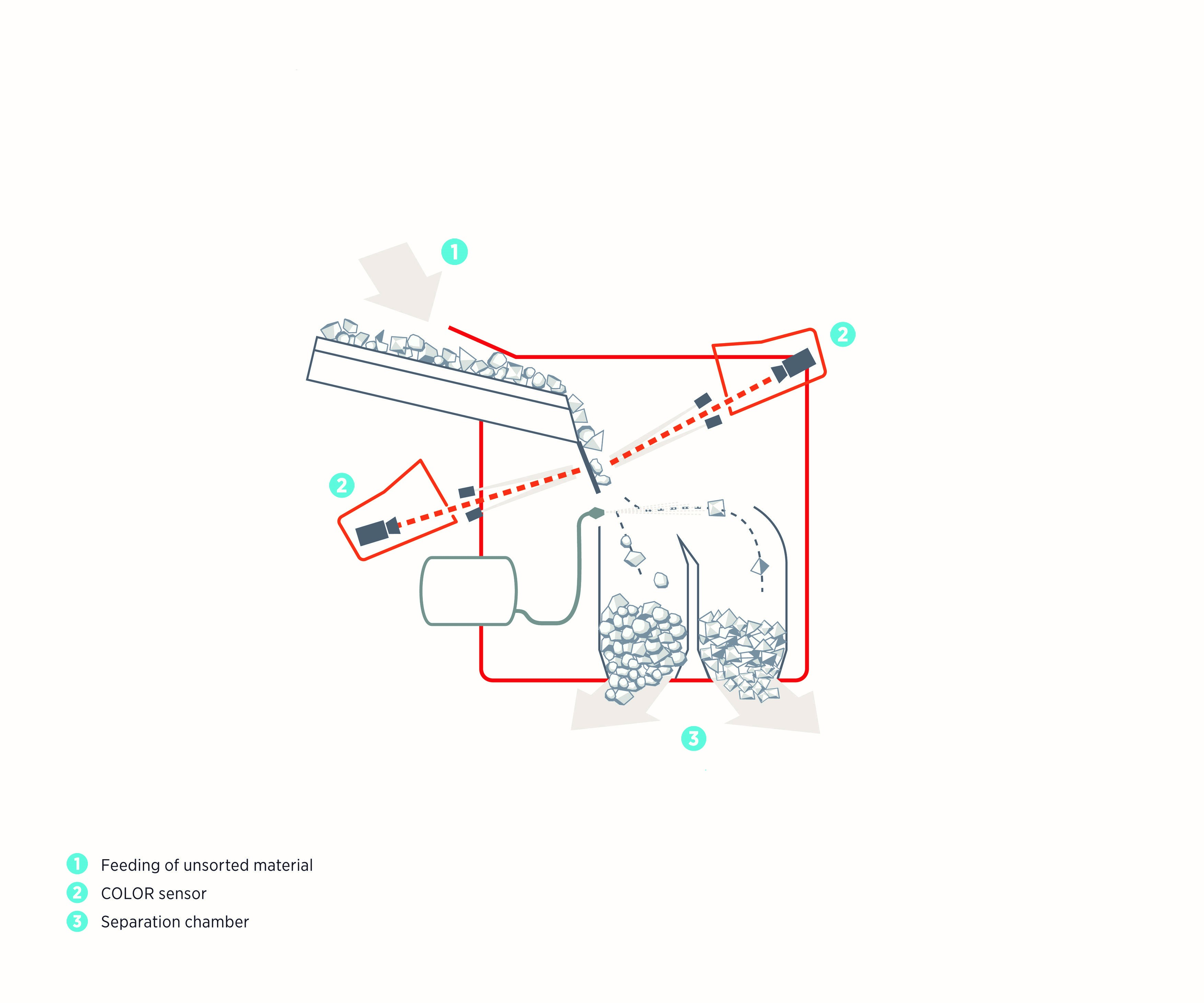
Side view and working principle of chute-type sensor-based ore sorting machine

The cost for most average farmers and industry workers is around $500 for the study and ergonomic design of the sensor. The sensor itself is still a prototype not yet built but looking to be approved by FDA around 2003

==== Belt-type machine ====
The belt-type machine is generally more applicable to smaller and to adhesive feed. In addition, the feed presentation is more stable which makes it more applicable for more difficult and heterogeneous applications.

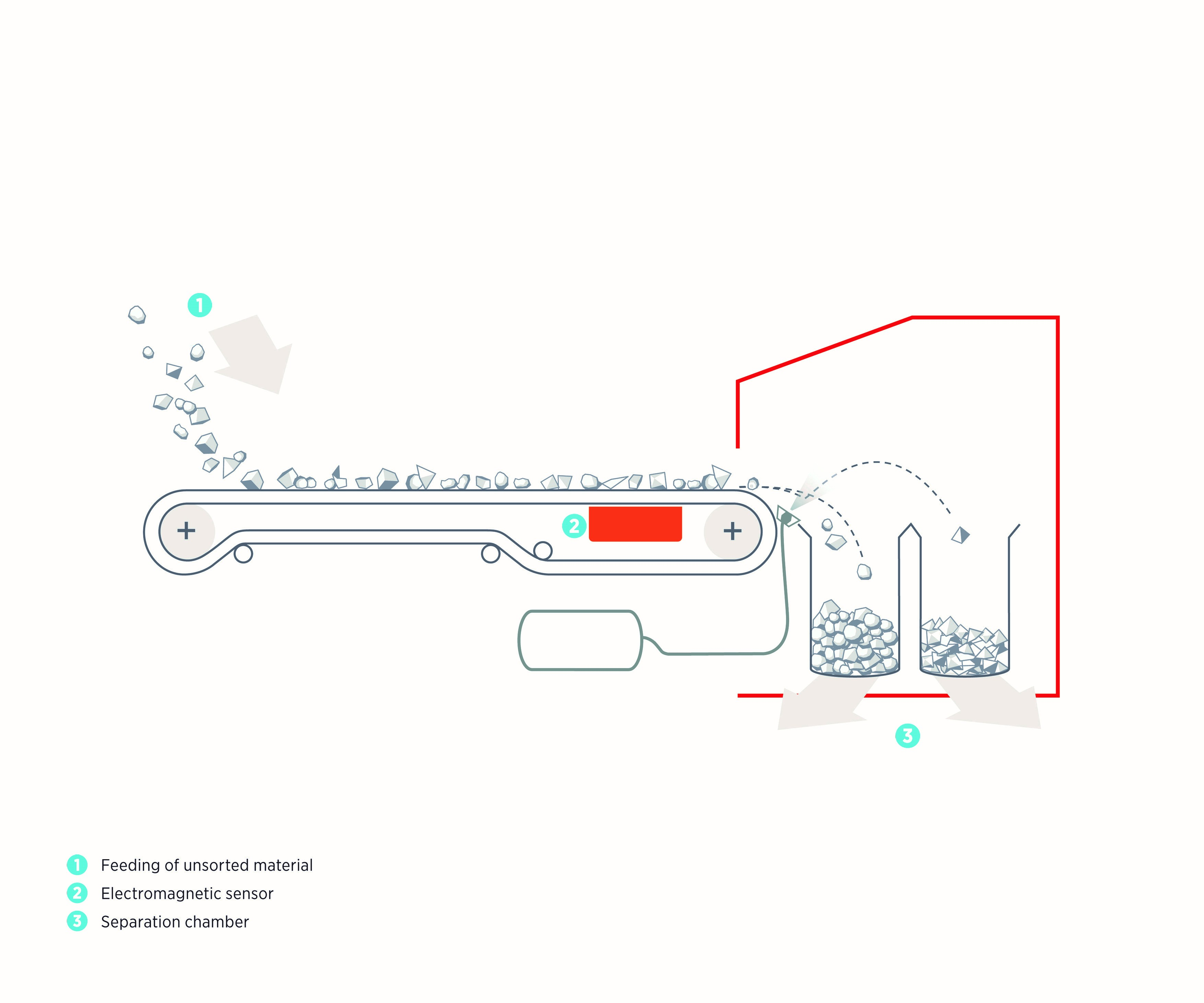
Side view and working principle of belt-type sensor-based ore sorting machine

=== Sub-processes ===
The separation in both machine types comprises the following sub-processes:

==== Feed distribution ====
A sized screen fraction with a size range coefficient (d95/d5) of 2-5 (optimal 2-3) is fed onto a vibratory feeder which has the function to create a mono-layer, by pre-accelerating the particles. A common misunderstanding in plant design is, that you can use the vibratory feeder to discharge from a buffer bunker but a separate units needs to be applied, since the feed distribution is very important to the efficiency of the sensor-based sorter and different loads on the feeder change its position and vibration characteristics.

==== Presentation ====
The feed is then transferred to the presentation mechanism which is the belt or the chute in the two main machine types respectively. This sub-process has the function to pass single particles of the material stream in a stable and predictable manner, thus in a unidirectional movement orthogonal to the detection line with uniform speed profile.

==== Detection ====
In the detection sub-process location and property vectors are recorded to allow particle localization for ejection and material classification for discrimination purposes. All detection technologies applied have in common to be cheap, contactless and fast. The technologies are subdivided in transmitting and reflecting groups, the first measuring the inner content of a particle while the later only uses the surface reflection for discrimination. Surface, or reflection technologies have the disadvantage that the surfaces need to be representing the content, thus need to be clean from clay and dust adhesions. But by default surface reflection technologies violate the Fundamental Sampling Principle because not all components of a particle have the same probability of being detected.

The main transmitting technologies are EM (Electromagnetics) and XRT (X-ray-Transmission). EM detection is based on the conductivity of the material passing an alternating electromagnetic field. The principle of XRT is widely known through the application in medical diagnostics and airport luggage scanners. The main surface or reflection technologies are traditionally X-ray luminescence detectors capturing the fluorescence of diamonds under the excitation of X-ray radiation and color cameras detecting brightness and colour difference. Spectroscopic methods such as near-infrared spectroscopy known from remote sensing in exploration in mining for decades, have found their way into industrial scale sensor-based sorters. Advantage of the application of near-infrared spectroscopy is that the evidence can be measured on the presence of specific molecular bonds, thus minerals composition of the near-infrared active minerals. There is more detection technologies available on industrial scale sensor-based ore sorters. Readers that want to go into detail can find more in the literature.

==== Data processing ====
Spectral and spatial is collected by the detection system. The spatial component catches the position of the particles distribution across the width of the sorting machine, which is then used in case the ejection mechanism is activated for a single particle. Spectral data comprises the features that are used for material discrimination. In a superseding processing step, spectral and spatial can be combined to include patterns into the separation criterion. Huge amount of data is collected in real time multiple processing and filtering steps are bringing the data down to the Yes/no decision – either for ejecting a particle or for keeping the ejection mechanism still for that one.

==== Ejection ====
The state-of-the-art mechanism of today's sensor-based ore sorters is a pneumatic ejection. Here, a combination of high speed air valves and an array of nozzles perpendicular to the acceleration belt or chute allows precise application of air pulses to change the direction of flight of single particles. The nozzle pitch and diameter is adapted to the particle size. The air impulse must be precise enough to change the direction of flight of a single particle by applying the drag force to this single particle and directing it over the mechanical splitter plate.

=== Installations ===
Sensor-based sorting installations normally comprise the following basic units; crusher, screen, sensor-based sorter and compressor. There are principally two different kinds of installations that are described in the following paragraphs – stationary and semi-mobile installations.

==== Semi-mobile installations ====
Transportable semi-mobile installations have gained increasing popularity in the last two decades. They are enabled by the fact that complete sensor-based sorting systems are relatively compact in relation to the capacity in tonnes per hour. This is mainly because little infrastructure is needed. The picture shows a containerised sensor-based sorter which is applied in Chromitite sorting. The system is operated in conjunction with a Diesel-powered mobile crusher and screen. Material handling of the feed, undersize fraction, product and waste fraction is conducted using a wheel loader. The system is powered by a Diesel generator and a compressor station delivers the instrument quality air needed for the operation.

Semi-mobile installations are applied primarily to minimize material handling and save transport costs. Another reason for choosing the semi-mobile option for an installation is bulk testing of new ore bodies. Capacity of a system very much depends on the size fraction sorted, but a 250tph capacity is a good estimate for semi-mobile installations, considering a capacity of 125tph sorter feed and 125tph undersize material. During the last decade both generic plant designs and customised designs have been developed, for example in the framework of the i2mine project.

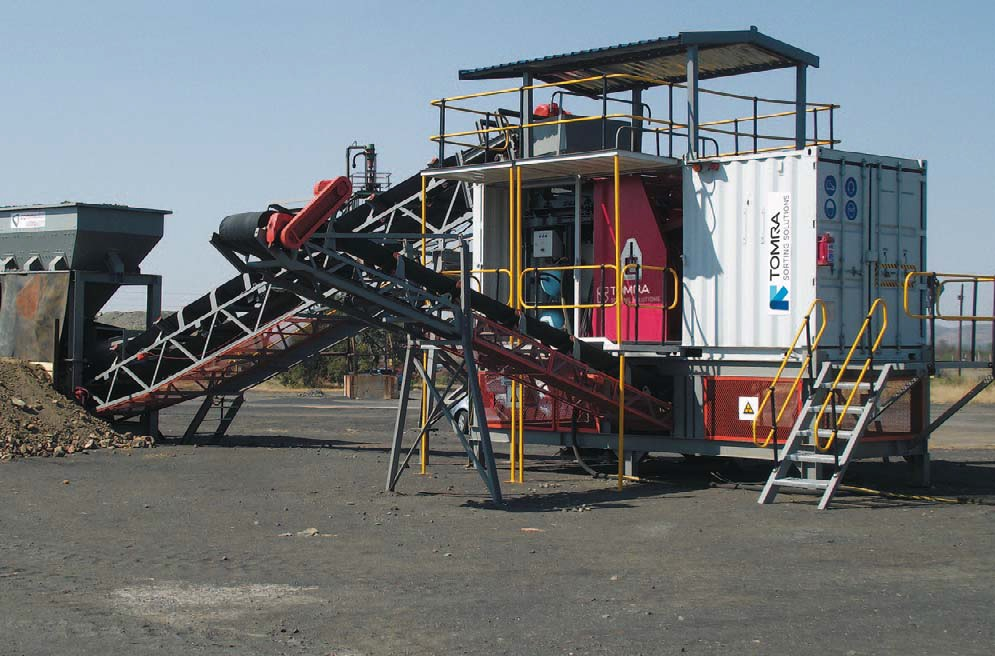
Containerised sensor-based ore sorter applied in a modular plant operated as semi-mobile installation

==== Stationary installations ====
To cope with high volume mass flows and for application, where a changing physical location of the sensor-based sorting process is of no benefit for the financial feasibility of the operation, stationary installations are applied. Another reason for applying stationary installations are multistage (Rougher, Scavenger, Cleaner) sensor-based ore sorting processes. Within stationary installations, sorters are usually located in parallel, which allows transport of the discharge fractions with one product and one waste belt respectively, which decreases plant footprint and amount of conveyors.

=== Positions in the flow-sheet ===
==== Lumpy ore production ====
For higher grade applications such as ferrous metals, coal and industrial minerals, sensor-based ore sorting can be applied to create a final product. Pre-condition is, that the liberation allows for the creation of a sellable product. Undersize material is usually bypassed as product, but can also be diverted to the waste fraction, if the composition does not meet the required specifications. This is case and application dependent.

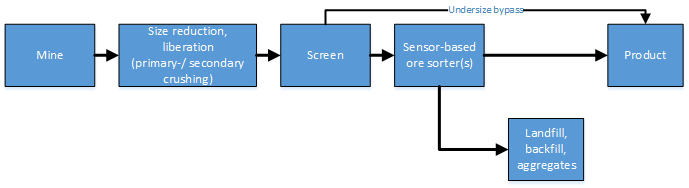
Simplified flow-sheet for lumpy ore production

==== Waste rejection ====
Most prominent example of the application of sensor-based ore sorting is the rejection of barren waste before transporting and comminution. Waste rejection is also known under the term pre-concentration. A discrimination has been introduced by Robben. Rule of thumb is that at least 25% of liberated barren waste must be present in the fraction to be treated by sensor-based ore sorting to make waste rejection financially feasible.

Reduction of waste before it enters comminution and grinding processes does not only reduce the costs in those processes, but also releases the capacity that can be filled with higher grade material and thus implies higher productivity of the system. A prejudice against the application of a waste rejection process is, that the valuable content lost in this process is a penalty higher than the savings that can be achieved. But it is reported in the literature that the overall recovery even increases through bringing higher grade material as feed into the mill. In addition, the higher productivity is an additional source of income. If noxious waste such as acid consuming calcite is removed, the downstream recovery increases and the downstream costs decrease disproportionally as reported for example by Bergmann. The coarse waste rejected can be an additional source of income if there is a local market for aggregates.

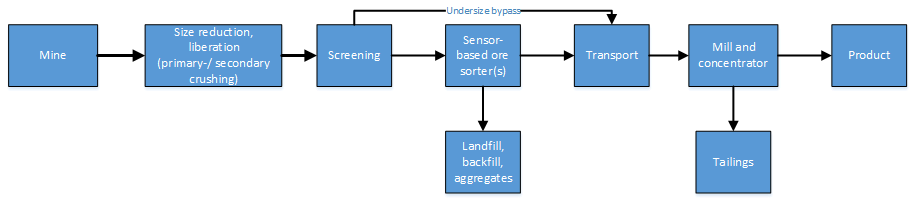
Simplified flow-sheet for waste rejection with sensor-based ore sorting

==== Marginal ore treatment ====
Sensor-based ore sorting is financially especially attractive for low grade or marginal ore or waste dump material. This described scenario describes that waste dump material or marginal ore is sorted and added to the run-of-mine production. The needed capacity for the sensor-based ore sorting step is less in this case such as the costs involved. Requirement is that two crude material streams are fed in parallel, requiring two crushing stations. Alternatively, marginal and high grade ore can be buffered on an intermediate stockpile and dispatched in an alternating operation. The latter option has the disadvantage that the planned production time, the loading, of the sensor-based ore sorter is low, unless a significant intermediate stockpile or bunker is installed. Treating the marginal ore separately has the advantage that less equipment is needed since the processed material stream is lower, but it has the disadvantage that the potential of the technology is not unfolded for the higher grade material, where sensor-based sorting would also add benefit.

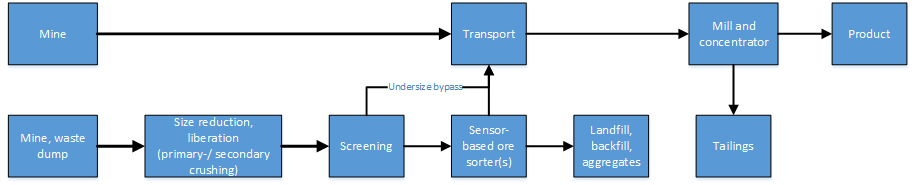
Simplified flow-sheet for marginal ore treatment with sensor-based ore sorting

==== Sensor-based ore sorting in pebble-circuit of autogenious and semi-autogenious mills ====
Pebble circuits are a very advantageous location for the application of sensor-based ore sorters. Usually it is hard waste recirculating and limiting the total mill capacity. In addition, the tonnage is significantly lower in comparison to the total run-of-mine stream, the size range is applicable and usually uniform and the particles' surfaces are clean. High impact on total mill capacity is reported in the literature.

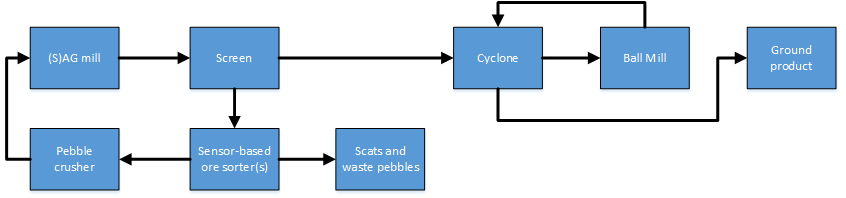
Simplified flow-sheet for waste and scats removal with sensor-based ore sorting from a pebble circuit

=== Ore-type diversion ===
Sensor-based sorting can be applied to separate the coarse fraction of the run-of-mine material according to its characteristics. Possible separation criteria are grade, mineralogy, grade and grindability amongst others. Treating different ore types separately results either in an optimised cash flow in the sense, that revenue ist shifted to an earlier point in time, or increased overall recovery which translates to higher productivity and thus revenue. If two separate plant lines are installed, the increased productivity must compensate for the overall higher capital expenditure and operating costs.

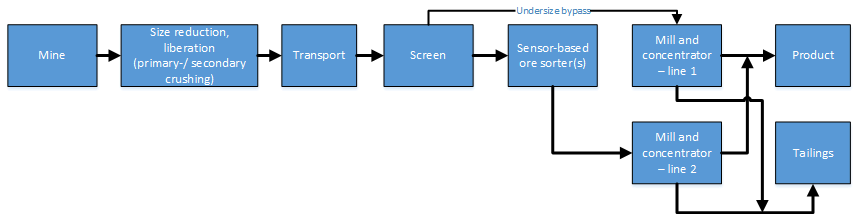
Simplified flow-sheet of ore type diversion with sensor-based ore sorting

=== Economic impact ===
Sensor-based ore sorting is in comparison to other coarse particle separation technologies relatively cheap. While the costs for the equipment itself are relatively high in capital expenditure and operating costs, the absence of extensive infrastructure in a system results in operating costs that are to be compared to jigging. The specific costs are very much depending on the average particle size of the feed and on the ease of the separation. Coarser particles imply higher capacity and thus less costs. Detailed costing can be conducted after the mini-bulk stage in the technical feasibility evaluation.

Prejudice against waste rejection with sensor-based sorting widely spread, that the loss of valuables, thus the recovery penalty of this process, supersedes the potential downstream cost savings and is therefore economically not viable. For waste rejection, the aim for the separation with sensor-based ore sorting must be put onto maximum recovery, which means that only low grade or barren waste is rejected because the financial feasibility is very much sensitive to that factor. Nevertheless, through the rejection of waste before comminution and concentration steps, recovery can be often increased in the downstream process, meaning that the overall recovery is equal or even higher than the one in the base case, meaning that instead of losing product, additional product can be produced, which adds the additional revenue to the cost savings on the positive side in the cash flow. If the rejected material is replaced with additional higher grade material, the main economic benefit unfolds through the additional production. It implies, that in conjunction with sensor-based ore sorting, the capacity of the crushing station is increased, to allow for the additional mass-flow that is subsequently taken out by the sensor-based ore sorters as waste.

=== Technical feasibility testing ===
==== Bulk characterisation ====
Precondition for the applicability of sensor-based ore sorting is the presence of liberation at the particle size of interest. Before entering into sensor-based ore sorting testing procedures there is the possibility to assess the degree of liberation through the inspection of drill cores, hand-counting and washability analysis. The quantification of liberation does not include any process efficiencies, but gives an estimate of the possible sorting result and can thus be applied for desktop financial feasibility analysis.

Drill core analysis Both for green-field and brown-field applications, inspection of drill core in combination with the grade distribution and mineralogical description is a good option for estimation of the liberation characteristics and the possible success of sensor-based ore sorting. In combination with the mining method and mine plan, an estimation of possible grade distribution in coarse particles can be done.

===== Hand counting =====
Hand-counting is a cheap and easy to conduct method to estimate the liberation characteristics of a bulk sample wither originating from run-of-mine material, a waste dump or for example exploration trenching. Analysis of particles in the size range 10-100mm has been conducted on a total sample mass of 10 tonnes. By visual inspection of trained personnel, a classification of each particle into different bins (e.g. lithology, grade) is possible and the distribution is determined by weighing each bin. A trained professional can quickly estimate the efficiency of a specific detection and process efficiency of sensor-based ore sorting knowing the sensor response of the mineralogy of ore in question and other process efficiency parameters.

===== Washability analysis =====
The washability analysis is widely known in bulk material analysis, where the specific density is the physical property describing the liberation and the separation results, which is then in the form of the partition curve. The partition curve is defined as the curve which gives as a function of a physical property or characteristic, the proportions in which different elemental classes of raw feed having the same property are split into separate products. It is thus per its definition not limited to, but predominantly applied in analysis of liberation and process efficiency of density separation processes. For sensor-based ore sorting, the partition (also called Tromp) curves for chromite, iron ore and coal are known and can thus be applied for process modelling.

===== Single particle testing =====
Single particle testing is an extensive laboratory procedure developed by Tomra. Out of a sample set of multiple hundreds of fragments in the size range 30-60mm are measured individually on each of the available detection technologies. After recording of the raw data, all the fragments are comminute and assayed individually which then allows plotting of the liberation function of the sample set and in addition, the detection efficiency of each detection technology in combination with the calibration method applied. This makes the evaluation of detection and calibration and subsequently the selection of the most powerful combination possible. This analysis is possible to be applied on quarters or half sections of drill core.

===== (Mini-) bulk testing =====
Mini-bulk tests are conducted with 1-100t of samples on industrial scale sensor-based ore sorters. The size fraction intervals to be treated are prepared using screen classifications. Full capacity is established then with each fraction and multiple cut-points are programmed in the sorting software. After creating multiple sorting fractions in rougher, scavenger and cleaner steps these weighed are sent for assays. The resulting data delivers all input for flow-sheet development. Since the tests are conducted on industrial scale equipment, there is no scale-up factor involved when designing a flow-sheet and installation of sensor-based ore sorting.

===== Bulk/ pilot testing =====
To gather relevant statistical data higher sample masses are needed in some cases. Thus, transportation of the sample into the mini-bulk testing facility becomes unviable and the equipment is set up in the field. Containerized units in conjunction with Diesel-powered crushing and screening equipment are often applied and used for production test runs under full scale operating conditions.

=== Process efficiency ===
The process efficiency of sensor-based ore sorting is described in detail by C. Robben in 2014. The total process efficiency is subdivided into the following sub-process efficiencies; Platform efficiency, preparation efficiency, presentation efficiency, detection efficiency and separation efficiency. All the sub-process contribute to the total process efficiency, of course in combination with the liberation characteristics of the bulk material that the technology is applied to. The detailed description of the sub-processes and their contribution to the total process efficiency can be found in the literature.

=== Suppliers ===
==== Steinert GmbH – Sorting technologies for mining and recycling ====
Steinert provides sorting technologies for recycling and mining industries using a variety of sensors, like X-ray, inductive, NIR and color optical sensors and 3D laser camera, which can be combined for sorting a variety of materials. NIR technology is used in the recycling field.

==== Tomra Sorting Solutions │ Mining ====
A sensor-based sorting equipment supplier with large installed base in the industries mining, recycling and food. Tomra's sensor-based sorting equipment and services for the precious metals and base metals segment are marketed through a cooperation agreement with Outotec from Finland, which brings the comminution, processing and application experience of Outotec together with Tomra's sensor-based ore sorting technology and application experience.

==== Raytec Vision │ Sorting solutions for food industry ====
Raytec Vision is a camera and sensor-based manufacturer based in Parma and specialized in food sorting. The applications of Raytec Vision's machines are many: tomatoes, tubers, fruit, fresh cut, vegetables and confectionery products. Each machine can separate good products from wastes, foreign bodies and defects and guarantees high levels of food safety for the final consumer.

==== Comex – Sorting technologies for mining ====
Comex provides sorting technologies for mining industries using multi-sensory solution integrated in the same sorting units, like X-ray, hyper-spectral IR and color optical sensors and 3D cameras, which can be very effective in identifying and sorting of various mineral particles. Integration of AI models for sensor data processing is of critical importance to achieve good sorting results.

=== Sensor-based sorting conference ===
The expert conference “Sensor-Based Sorting” is addressing new developments and applications in the field of automatic sensor separation techniques for primary and secondary raw materials. The conference provides a platform for plant operators, manufacturers, developers and scientists to exchange know-how and experiences.

The congress is hosted by the Department of Processing and Recycling and the Unit for Mineral Processing (AMR) of RWTH Aachen University in cooperation with the GDMB Society of Metallurgists and Miners, Clausthal. Scientific supervisors are Professor Thomas Pretz and Professor Hermann Wotruba. .

=== Videos ===
Tungsten plays a large and indispensable role in modern high-tech industry. Up to 500,000 tons of raw tungsten ore are mined each year by Wolfram Bergbau und Hütten AG (WHB)in Felbertal, Austria, which is the largest scheelite deposit in Europe. 25% of the run-of-mine ore are separated as waste before entering the mill.
