= Colour sorter =

Machines that separate items by colours

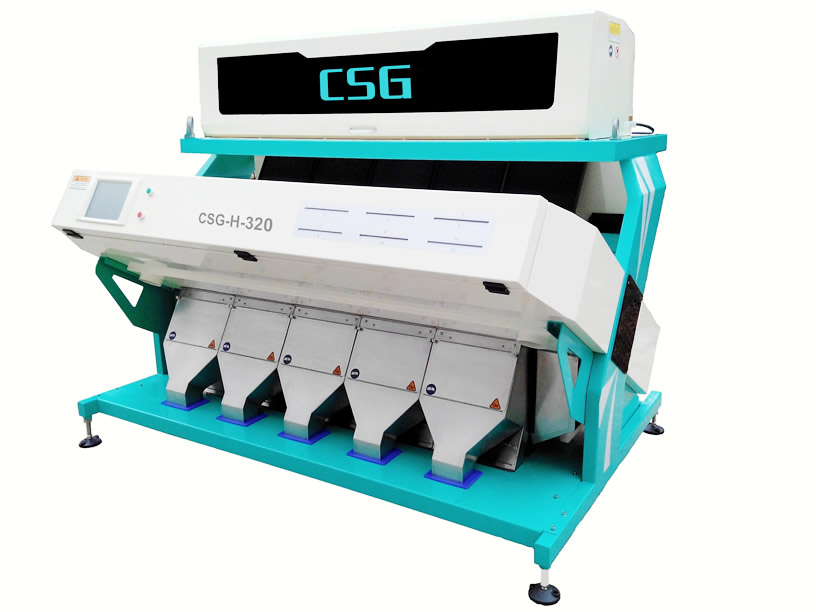
Color sorter's working principle is according to the difference of the optical properties of the material, using photoelectric detection technology automatic to sort the heterochromatic granule from raw material.

Color sorters or colour sorters (sometimes called optical sorters, digital sorters, or electronic color sorters) are machines used on production lines in bulk food processing and other industries. They sort items by color, detecting passing items' colors and using mechanical or pneumatic devices to divert items with colors outside the acceptable range or to create distinct groups.

== Application ==
=== Grain industry ===
Color sorters are mostly used in sorting grain and other agricultural products. The rice sorting industry is the first big market. The rice sorting technology is according to the color differences of rice (husked paddy) materials, using a high-resolution CCD optical sensor to separate stones, black rice, etc. It is the final step after polishing rice with a rice polisher. The second sorting market is in use for coarse cereals, such as wheat, corn, peanuts, different kinds of beans, sesame seeds, etc. This can also include grains, seeds, cereals, pulses, coffee, and nuts. The color sorters can also be used to remove harmful plastics and metals.

Optical color sorters are among the newest technologies in seed and grain processing. This equipment separates particles based on color and is often used at or near the end of the processing line, after mechanical separations, to remove impurities of similar size and density.

Machines are available from a quarter to ten chutes wide. Technology range includes a simple monochromatic version, to bichromatic, NIR, InGaAs, RGB Full Color, and shape sizing.

Color sorting is used to ensure the best purity of bulk products and ensure that the strictest food hygiene and health requirements of end-products are met.

=== Food industry ===
A color sorter discarding unripe, overripe or otherwise unsuitable coffee fruits

Color sorters are used in the food processing industry, such as coffee, nuts, and oil crops with the goal of separating items that are discolored, toxic (such as ergot), or not as ripe as required. Compared with manual sorting, machines are more efficient than manual labor and have lower processing costs. Throughputs have increased with the use of new CCD technologies and are now up to 100 t/h.

=== Diamond and mining industry ===
Color sorters are also used in the diamond industry. The transparency of the diamond is measured by the color sorter and used as a measurement of its purity, and the diamonds are mechanically sorted accordingly. This has an advantage over X-ray fluorescence methods of robotically detecting purity, since purer diamonds are less likely to fluoresce.

In the mining sorting industry, color sorting is also called sensor-based sorting technology. Optical color sorters (CCD color camera) combine X-ray sorting technology and NIR (near infrared spectrometry) to pick out the impurities of ore, minerals, stone and sand products, or separate ore into two or more categories.

=== Recycling industry ===
In the recycling industry, color sorters are widely used for plastic and glass color sorting. Color sorters can distinguish between colored and colorless plastic flakes such as polyethylene terephthalate flakes or high density polyethylene flakes, and can separate flakes by color before re-granulation. For instance, a color sorter can separate non-food-grade polyethylene terephthalate from food grade. In glass recycling, a color sorter can remove various contaminants such as ceramic, stones, porcelain and metals from glass fragments. After this removal, the glass fragments can be reused as secondary raw material. Typically, belt-type color sorters are used for sorting recycling materials rather than chute-type color sorters because belt-type color sorters handle a wider variety of more irregularly shaped materials.

Additionally, object sorters are becoming increasingly important, as they enable sorting entire uncrushed bottles or containers, significantly streamlining the recycling process. Unlike traditional color sorters, object sorters utilize advanced sensor technology to identify materials based on shape, size, and composition, facilitating effective separation of mixed recyclable objects. These object sorters enhance recycling efficiency by reducing manual sorting efforts and improving the purity of sorted materials.

== Types ==
Sorters can be divided into chute-type and belt-type color sorters.

Belt-type color sorters break a smaller percentage of the material (important for nuts), and the product stays relatively static during the transport process as it moves horizontally on the belt. In the chute type, material slides on the chute because of gravity, causing collision, friction, and larger vertical movements, thus worsening the ratio of broken material. The belt structure makes the transmission smooth and stable without bouncing material.

Chute-type color sorters are commonly used for food, as prices are lower, capacities are higher, and products can be seen more easily from both sides, which is important when a dehulled grain has hull only on one side. Chute sorters are usually applicable to specific products, as the chute is designed with special channels for this kind of material based on size and shape of the material. For example, 5 mm chutes are used for rice, grain, and plastic granules. Flat chutes are right for plastic flakes, such as PET, or milk bottle flakes.

== Sources ==
- Somani, L. L. (1989). "electronic colour sorter". Dictionary of plant sciences (including horticulture). Mittal Publications. ISBN 978-81-7099-130-4.
- Kumar, Dinesh (2008). "electronic colour sorter (seed)". Definitional Glossary Of Agricultural Terms. Vol. 2. I. K. International Pvt Ltd. ISBN 978-81-906757-4-1.
- Malhotra, Deepak; Taylor, Patrick R.; Spiller, Erik; LeVier, Marc (2009). "Other separation processes". Recent Advances in Mineral Processing Plant Design. SME. ISBN 978-0-87335-316-8.
- Scheirs, John (1998). "Optical Sorting". Polymer recycling: science, technology, and applications. Wiley. ISBN 978-0-471-97054-5.
