= Rice color sorting machine =

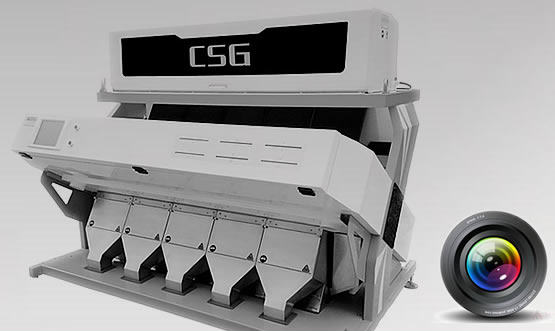

== Features ==
A rice color sorting machine, also named rice colour sorter, separates rice grains according to color differences in raw rice arising from anomalies like bits of stone, bad rice, black rice, half-husked rice, etc. A high-resolution CCD optical sensor drives a mechanical sorter to separate different granular materials, automatically sorting heterochromatic particles out of the batch of raw rice; removing such impurities in this process improves the quality of the rice.

== History ==
Rice colour sorters have been around for a number of decades, and the technology has improved over the years with the advancement in integrated circuitry, camera optics and faster ejector valves allowing for machines that process grains faster and with higher capacities on smaller footprints.

== Working principle ==
Rice processing begins in a milling plant, where the harvested grains run through a production line where the paddy is boiled, dried, de-stoned, de-husked, hulled and shelled into rice. It then is taken to the color sorter machine. At this point, the rice mixture will travel by elevator belt into a hopper on top of the machine, from which it will flow down along chutes in the colour sorter, streamlining their flow to so that they may be scanned by CCD sensors. The moment the camera detects any color defects, the camera instructs ejectors fitted in the machine to open the nozzle. The nozzle is connected to valves containing compressed air. This air is then used to shoot out the color defected material from the input rice. The types of defects in rice include black tipped, chalky, yellow, mouse droppings, immature grain, etc.

== Working Environment ==
1. The working environment: normal temperature, normal pressure, aeration-drying, dust-free place. Working temperature: 20 - 45 degrees °C.
2. Air system: air compressor, air tank, air dryer connect color sorter solenoid valve. Usually working pressure at least is 0.2 MPa.
3. Common Voltage: air compressor 380 V, 50 Hz. Color Sorter: 220 V, 50 Hz.

== Common machine types and models ==
1. Vertical type machine, model: 64channels, 128channels, 192 channels, 256 channels, 320 channels, 384 channels, 512 channels, 640 channels.
2. Belt type machine, model: 300mm belt width, 600mm belt width, 1000mm belt width, 1200mm belt width, 2000mm belt width

Choose different types and models of color sorters according to different types of rice. Usually, the output of vertical machine is larger than that of belt type machine.
