= Food grading =

Inspection and sorting of foodstuffs for various parameters

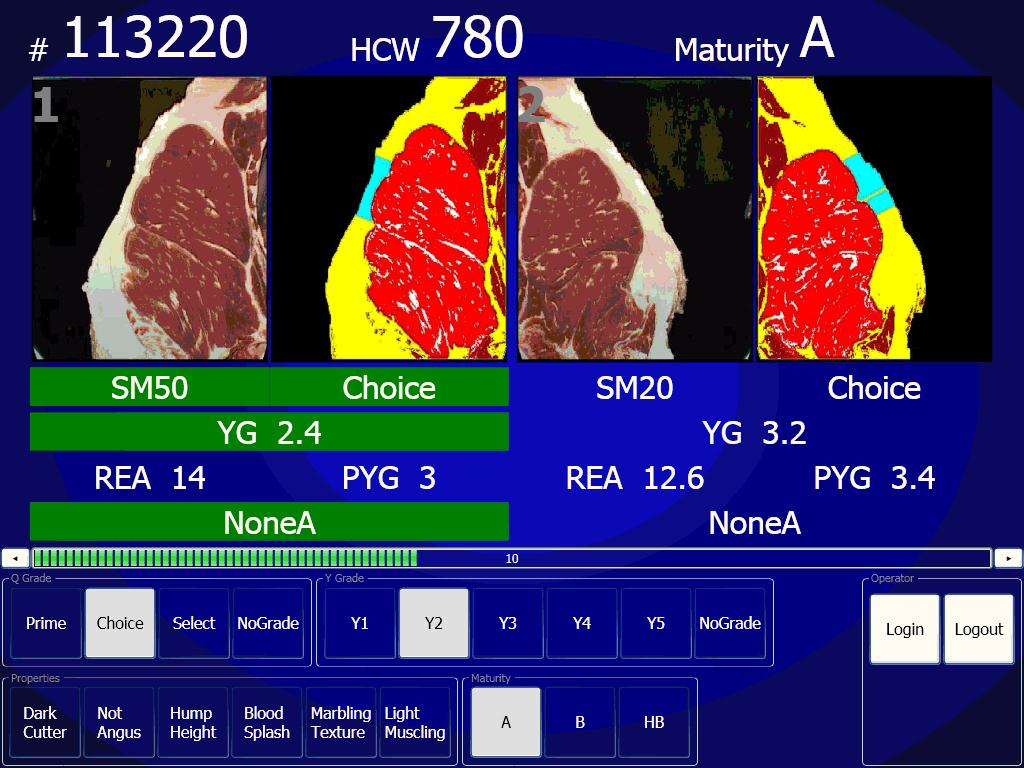
A screenshot from the electronic grading system showing USDA Choice, Yield Grade 2 beef. The left is the natural color view of the cut; the right is the instrument enhanced view that details the amount of marbling, size, and fat thickness.

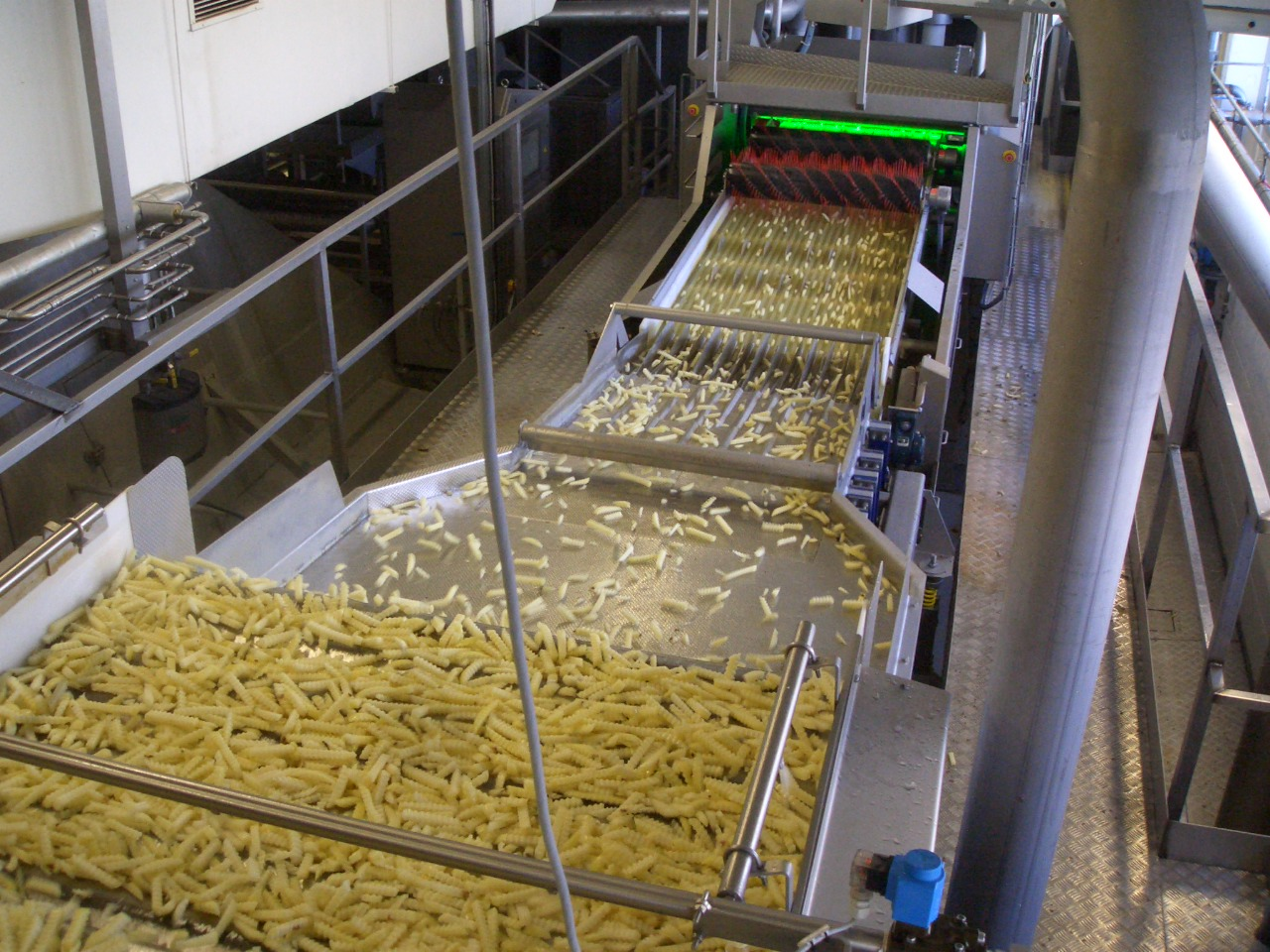
Optical sorting achieves non-destructive, 100 percent inspection in-line at full production volumes.

Food grading involves the inspection, assessment and sorting of various foods regarding quality, freshness, legal conformity and market value. Food grading is often done by hand, in which foods are assessed and sorted. Machinery is also used to grade foods, and may involve sorting products by size, shape and quality. For example, machinery can be used to remove spoiled food from fresh product.

== By food type ==
=== Beef ===
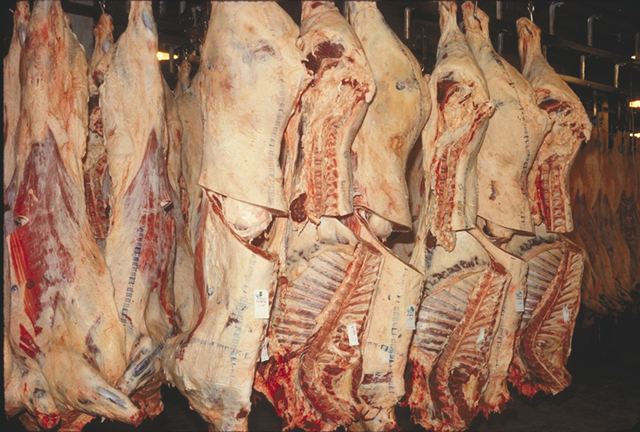
Inspected beef carcasses tagged by the USDA

Beef grading in the United States is performed by the United States Department of Agriculture's (USDA) Agricultural and Marketing Service. There are eight beef quality grades, with U.S. Prime being the highest grade and U.S. Canner being the lowest grade. Beef grading is a complex process.

=== Beer ===
In beer grading, the letter "X" is used on some beers, and was traditionally a mark of beer strength, with the more Xs the greater the strength. Some sources suggest that the origin of the mark was in the breweries of medieval monasteries. Another plausible explanation is contained in a treatise entitled "The Art of Brewing" published in London in 1829. It says: "The duties on ale and beer, which were first imposed in 1643... at a certain period, in distinguishing between small beer and strong, all ale or beer, sold at or above ten shillings per barrel, was reckoned to be strong and was, therefore, subjected to a higher duty. The cask which contained this strong beer was then first marked with an X signifying ten; and hence the present quack-like denominations of XX (double X) and XXX (treble X) on the casks and accounts of the strong-ale brewers".

In mid-19th century England, the use of "X" and other letters had evolved into a standardised grading system for the strength of beer. Today, it is used as a trade mark by a number of brewers in the United Kingdom, the Commonwealth and the United States.

European Bitterness Units scale, often abbreviated as EBU, is a scale for measuring the perceived bitterness of beer, with lower values being generally "less bitter" and higher values "more bitter". The scale and method are defined by the European Brewery Convention, and the numerical value should be the same as of the International Bitterness Units scale (IBU), defined in co-operation with the American Society of Brewing Chemists. However, the exact process of determining EBU and IBU values differs slightly, which may in theory result with slightly smaller values for EBU than IBU.

The International Bittering Units scale, or simply IBU scale, provides a measure of the bitterness of beer, which is provided by the hops used during brewing. Bittering units are measured through the use of a spectrophotometer and solvent extraction.

=== Coconut milk ===
Several grades of coconut milk exist: from thick at 20–22% fat to thin at 5–7% fat level.

=== Coffee ===
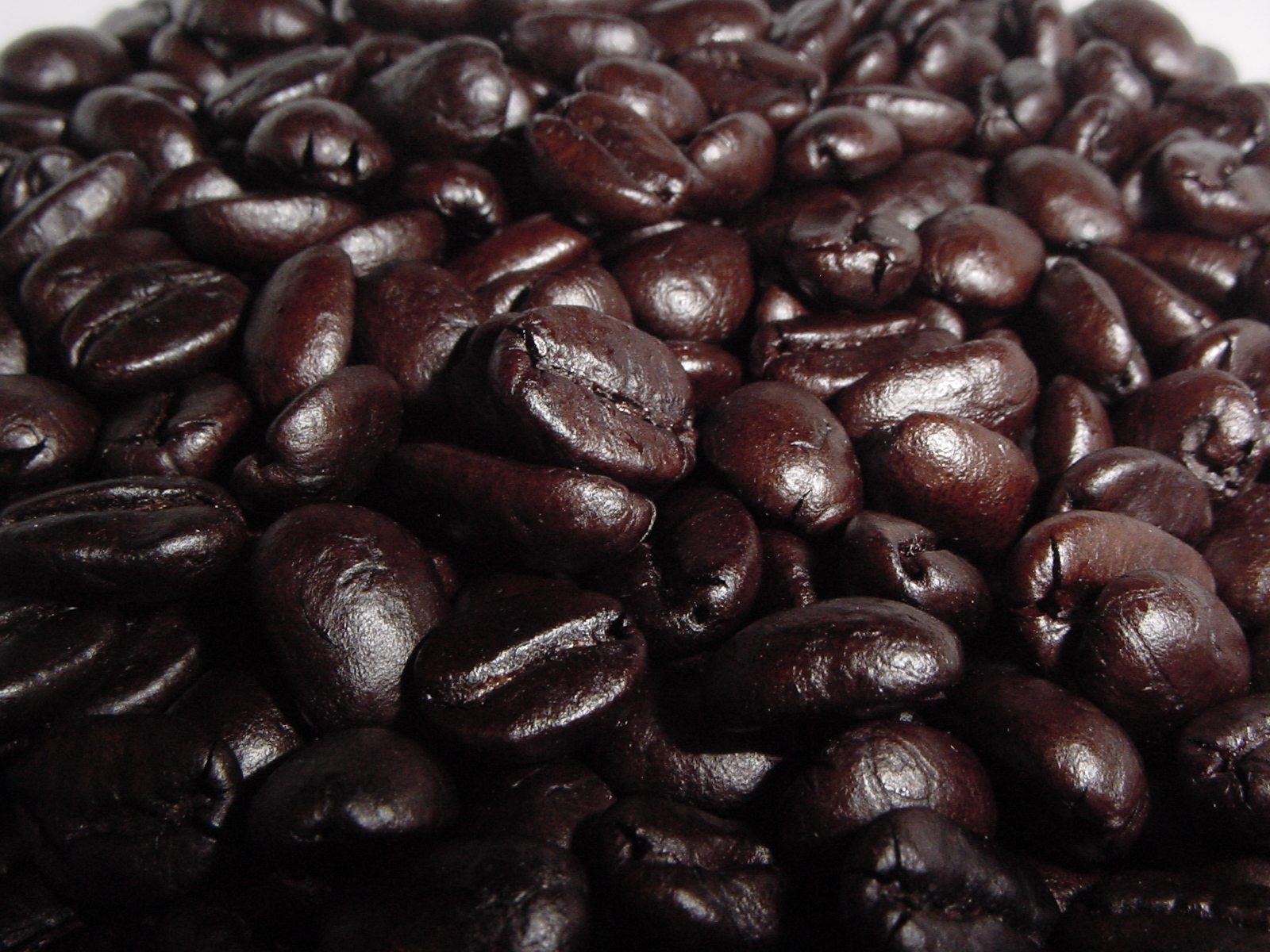
Dark-roasted coffee beans

Coffee growers, traders, and roasters grade beans based on size, color, and a variety of other characteristics. Coffees of exceptional quality are traded as "specialty coffees" and fetch a higher price in the international market.

After the roast, coffee grading involves assessment of roasted coffee seed colorization and then labeling as light, medium light, medium, medium dark, dark, or very dark. A more accurate method of discerning the degree of roast involves measuring the reflected light from roasted seeds illuminated with a light source in the near infrared spectrum. This elaborate light meter uses a process known as spectroscopy to return a number that consistently indicates the roasted coffee's relative degree of roast or flavor development.

=== Eggs ===
In the United States, egg grading is performed by the USDA, and is based upon the interior quality of the egg (see Haugh unit) and the appearance and condition of the egg shell. Eggs of any quality grade may differ in weight (size). Egg grading is performed by candling, which involves observing the interior of eggs by placing them in front of a bright light.

=== Fish ===
The freshness of fish may be measured using the Torry freshness scale, based on an objective assessment of the smell, taste, and general appearance of the fish, supplemented by electronic measurements. The scale was initially developed in 1953 at the Torry Research Station of the Central Science Laboratory in the UK.

=== Guar gum ===
Guar gum grading involves analysis for coloration, viscosity, moisture, granulation, protein content and insolubles ash.

=== Honey ===
Honey grading in the United States is performed voluntarily based upon USDA standards (USDA does offer inspection and grading "as on-line (in-plant) or lot inspection...upon application, on a fee-for-service basis."). Honey is graded based upon a number of factors, including water content, flavor and aroma, absence of defects and clarity. Honey is also classified by color though it is not a factor in the grading scale. US honey grade scales are Grade A, Grade B, Grade C and Grade substandard.

=== Lobster ===
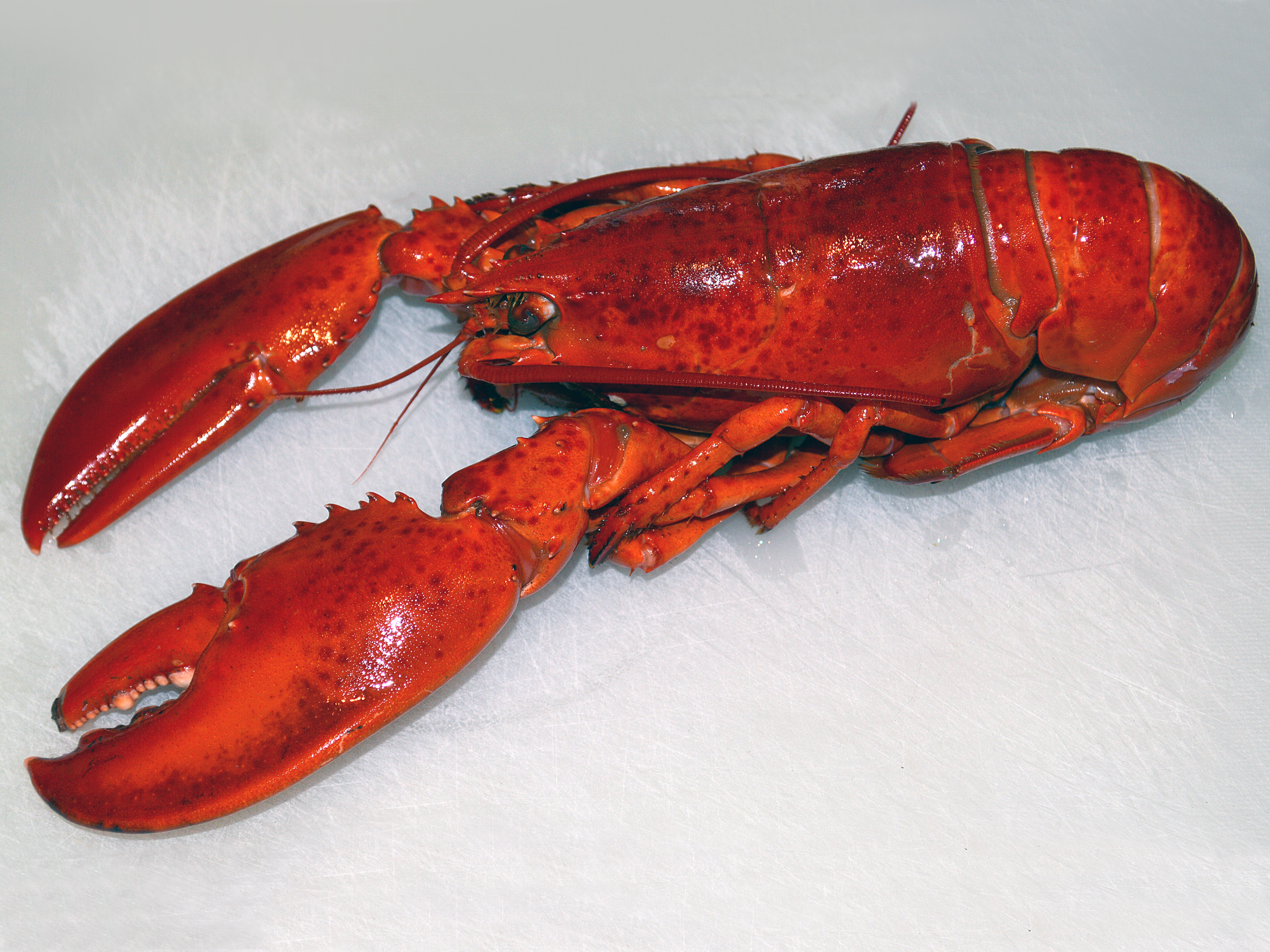
A cooked lobster

In the U.S., lobster grading involves denoting lobsters as new-shell, hard-shell or old-shell, and because lobsters which have recently shed their shells are the most delicate, there is an inverse relationship between the price of American lobster and its flavour. New-shell lobsters have paper-thin shells and a worse meat-to-shell ratio, but the meat is very sweet. However, the lobsters are so delicate that even transport to Boston almost kills them, making the market for new-shell lobsters strictly local to the fishing towns where they are offloaded. Hard-shell lobsters with firm shells, but with less sweet meat, can survive shipping to Boston, New York and even Los Angeles, so they command a higher price than new-shell lobsters. Meanwhile, old-shell lobsters, which have not shed since the previous season and have a coarser flavour, can be air-shipped anywhere in the world and arrive alive, making them the most expensive. One seafood guide notes that an eight-dollar lobster dinner at a restaurant overlooking fishing piers in Maine is consistently delicious, while "the eighty-dollar lobster in a three-star Paris restaurant is apt to be as much about presentation as flavor".

=== Maple syrup ===
Following an effort from the International Maple Syrup Institute (IMSI) and many maple syrup producer associations, both Canada and the United States have altered their laws regarding the classification of maple syrup to be uniform. Whereas in the past each state or province had their own laws on the classification of maple syrup, now those laws define a unified grading system. This had been a work in progress for several years, and most of the finalization of the new grading system was made in 2014. The Canadian Food Inspection Agency announced in the Canada Gazette on 28 June 2014 that rules for the sale of maple syrup would be amended to include new descriptors, at the request of the IMSI.

As of 31 December 2014, the Canadian Food Inspection Agency (CFIA) and as of 2 March 2015, the United States Department of Agriculture (USDA) Agricultural Marketing Service (AMS) issued revised standards on the classification of maple syrup as follows:

- Grade A
  - Golden Color and Delicate Taste
  - Amber Color and Rich Taste
  - Dark Color and Robust Taste
  - Very Dark Color and Strong Taste
- Processing Grade
- Substandard

As long as maple syrup does not have an off-flavor and is of a uniform color and clean and free from turbidity and sediment, it can be labelled as one of the A grades. If it exhibits any of these problems, it does not meet Grade A requirements and must be labelled as Processing Grade maple syrup and may not be sold in containers smaller than 5 gallons. If maple syrup does not meet the requirements of Processing Grade maple syrup (including a fairly characteristic maple taste), it is classified as Substandard. As of February 2015, this grading system has been accepted and made law by most maple-producing states and provinces, other than Ontario, Quebec, and Ohio. Vermont, in an effort to "jump-start" the new grading regulations, adopted the new grading system as of 1 January 2014, after the grade changes passed the Senate and House in 2013. Maine passed a bill to take effect as soon as both Canada and the United States adopted the new grades. They are allowing a one-year grace period. In New York, the new grade changes became law on 1 January 2015, with a one-year grace period. New Hampshire did not require legislative approval and so the new grade laws became effective as of 16 December 2014, and producer compliance was required as of 1 January 2016.

Golden and Amber grades typically have a milder flavor than Dark and Very dark, which are both dark and have an intense maple flavor. The darker grades of syrup are used primarily for cooking and baking, although some specialty dark syrups are produced for table use. Syrup harvested earlier in the season tends to yield a lighter color. With the new grading system, the classification of maple syrup depends ultimately on its internal transmittance at 560 nm wavelength through a 10 mm sample. Golden has to have more than 75 percent transmittance, Amber has to have 50.0 to 74.9 percent transmittance, Dark has to have 25.0 to 49.9 percent transmittance, and Very Dark is any product less than 25.0 percent transmittance.

==== Old grading system ====
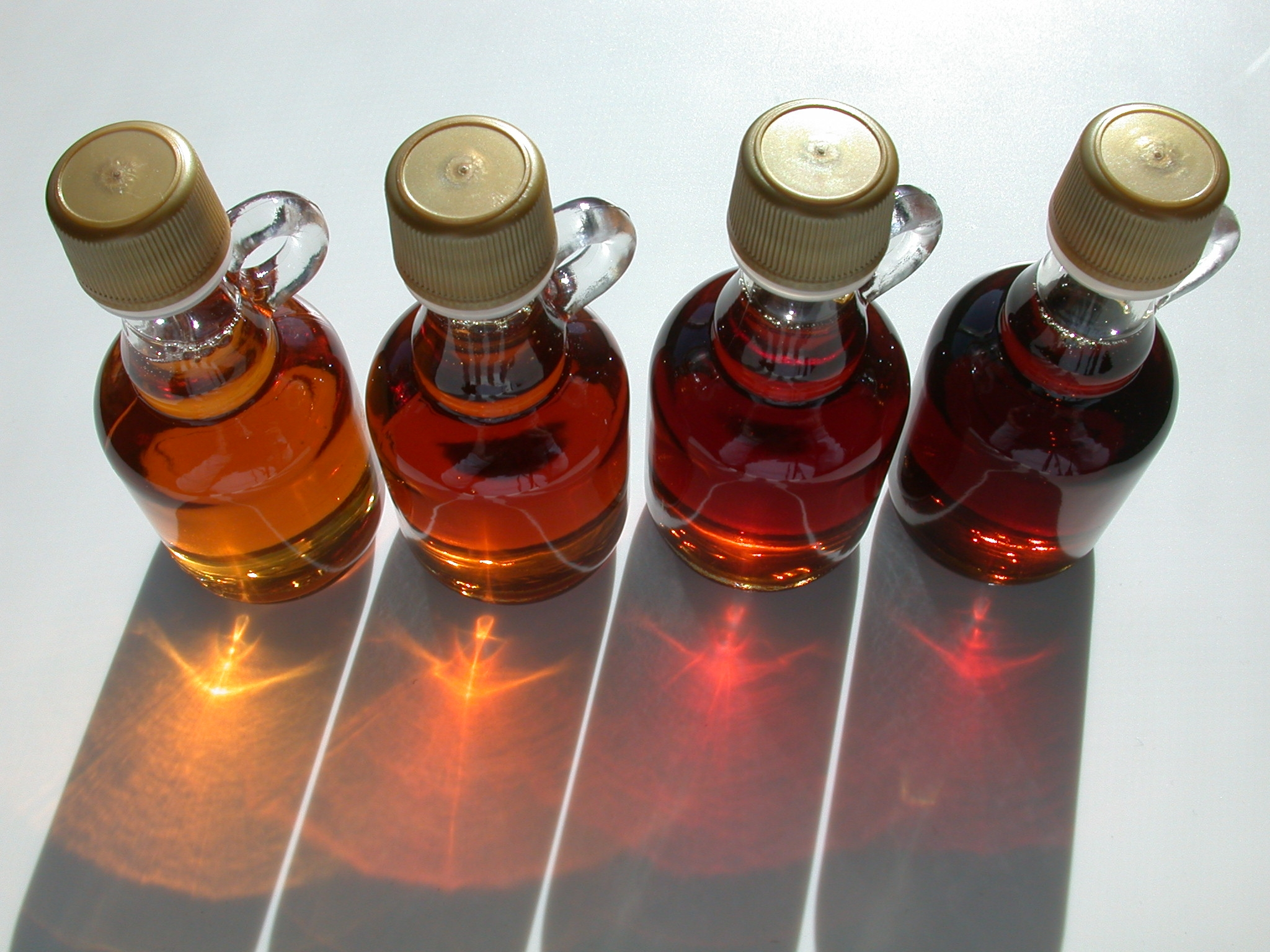
Old US maple syrup grades, left to right: Grade A Light Amber ("Fancy"), Grade A Medium Amber, Grade A Dark Amber, Grade B

In Canada, maple syrup was classified prior to 31 December 2014, by the Canadian Food Inspection Agency (CFIA) as one of three grades, each with several color classes: Canada No. 1, including Extra Light, Light, and Medium; No. 2 Amber; and No. 3 Dark or any other ungraded category. Producers in Ontario or Québec may have followed either federal or provincial grading guidelines. Québec's and Ontario's guidelines differed slightly from the federal: there were two "number" categories in Québec (Number 1, with four color classes, and 2, with five color classes). As in Québec, Ontario's producers had two "number" grades: 1, with three color classes; and 2, with one color class, which was typically referred to as "Ontario Amber" when produced and sold in that province only. A typical year's yield for a maple syrup producer will be about 25 to 30 percent of each of the #1 colors, 10 percent #2 Amber, and 2 percent #3 Dark. Producers in Quebec and Ontario may follow either federal or provincial grading guidelines, which differ slightly.

The United States used (some states still do, as they await state regulation) different grading standards. Maple syrup was divided into two major grades: Grade A and Grade B. Grade A was further divided into three subgrades: Light Amber (sometimes known as Fancy), Medium Amber, and Dark Amber. The Vermont Agency of Agriculture Food and Markets used a similar grading system of color, and is roughly equivalent, especially for lighter syrups, but using letters: "AA", "A", etc. The Vermont grading system differed from the US system in maintaining a slightly higher standard of product density (measured on the Baumé scale). New Hampshire maintained a similar standard, but not a separate state grading scale. The Vermont-graded product had 0.9 percent more sugar and less water in its composition than US-graded. One grade of syrup not for table use, called commercial or Grade C, was also produced under the Vermont system. Vermont inspectors enforce strict syrup grading regulations, and can fine producers up to US$1000 for labelling syrup incorrectly.

=== Milk ===
In the United States, there are two grades of milk, with Grade A primarily used for direct sales and consumption in stores, and Grade B used for indirect consumption, such as in cheese making or other processing.

The two grades are defined in the Wisconsin Administrative Code. Grade B generally refers to milk that is cooled in milk cans, which are immersed in a bath of cold flowing water that typically is drawn up from an underground water well rather than using mechanical refrigeration.

=== Oranges ===
The USDA has established the following grades for Florida oranges, which primarily apply to oranges sold as fresh fruit: US Fancy, US No. 1 Bright, US No. 1, US No. 1 Golden, US No. 1 Bronze, US No. 1 Russet, US No. 2 Bright, US No. 2, US No. 2 Russet, and US No. 3. The general characteristics graded are color (both hue and uniformity), firmness, maturity, varietal characteristics, texture, and shape. Fancy, the highest grade, requires the highest grade of color and an absence of blemishes, while the terms Bright, Golden, Bronze, and Russet concern solely discoloration.

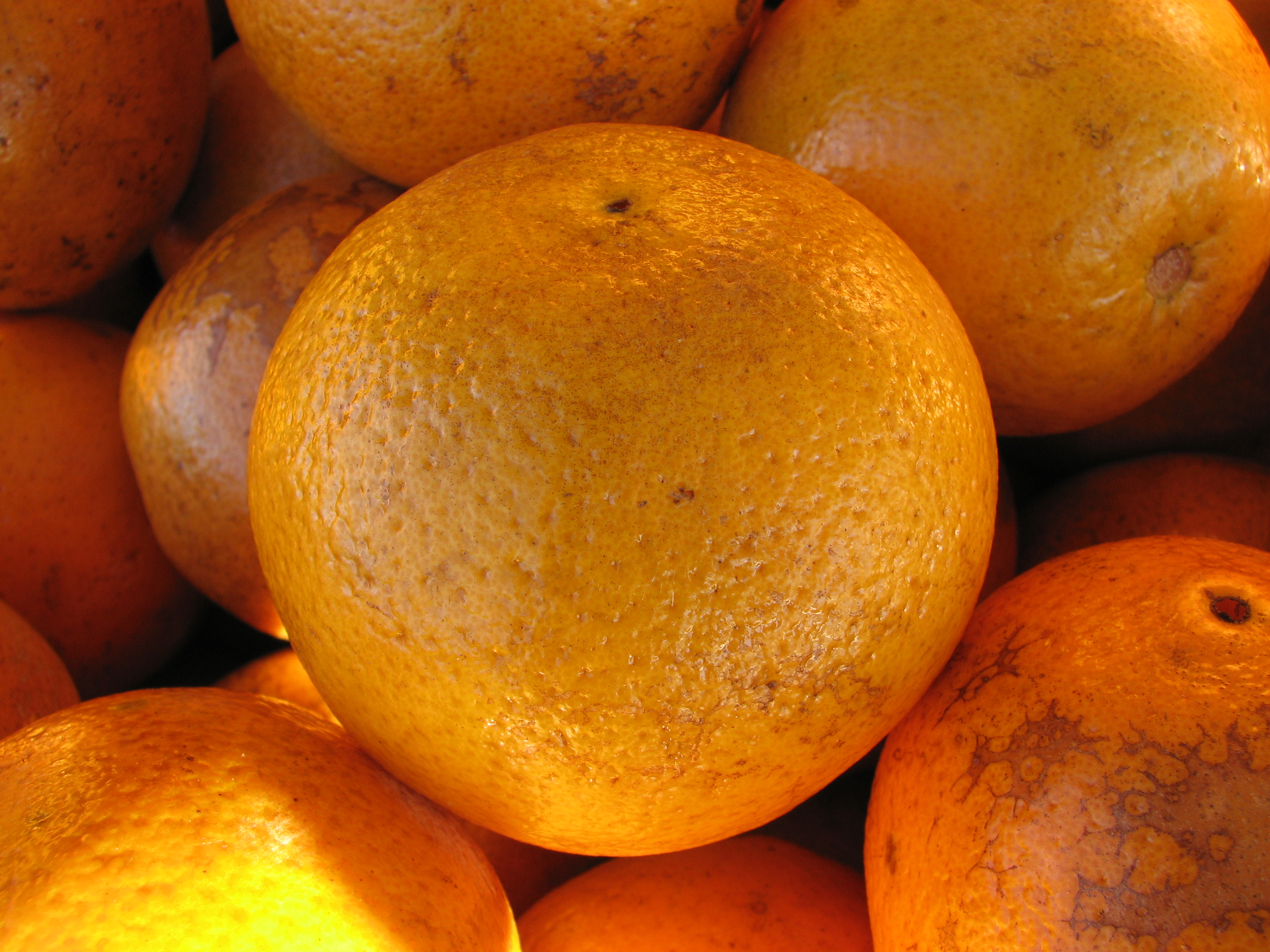
Florida navel oranges

=== Peas ===
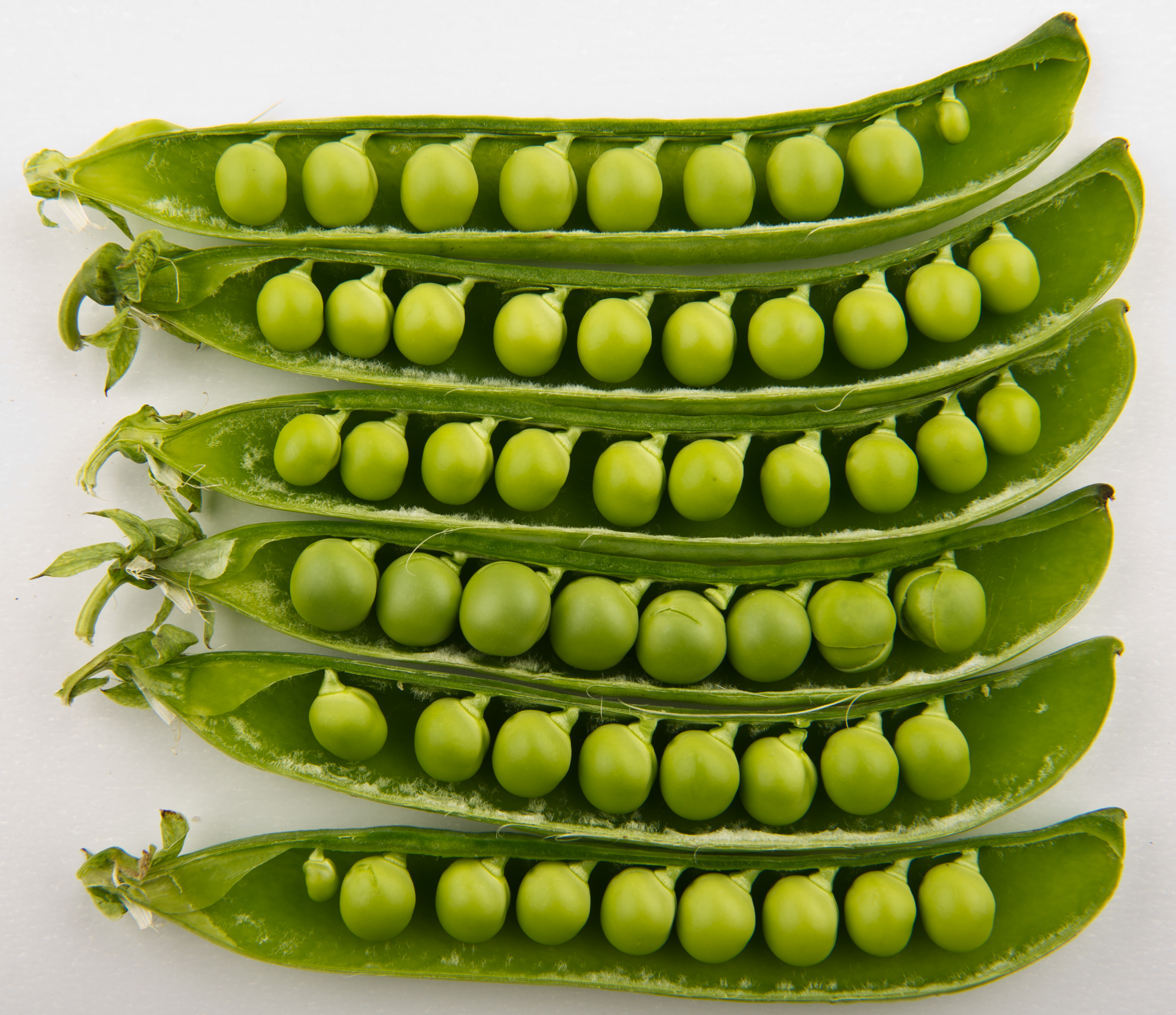
Peas

Pea grading involves sorting peas by size, in which smallest peas are graded as the highest quality for their tenderness. Brines may be used, in which peas are floated in them, from which their density can be determined.

=== Potatoes ===
In the U.S., potato grading for Idaho potatoes is performed in which No. 1 potatoes are the highest quality and No. 2 are rated as lower in quality due to their appearance (e.g. blemishes or bruises, pointy ends). Density assessment can be performed by floating them in brines. High density potatoes are desirable in the production of dehydrated mashed potatoes, potato crisps and french fries.

=== Rice ===
The main criteria used by many countries and millers in rice grading are degree of milling, appearance (color), damaged (broken) and percentage of chalky kernels. In the United States rice is marketed according to three main properties size, color and condition (kernels damage), these properties are directly related to quality, milling percentage and other processing conditions. All properties are considered important in grading. For instance, chalky kernels are not desirable because they give lower milling yields after processing and easily break during handling.

=== Spices ===
==== Cinnamon ====
In Sri Lanka, cinnamon grading is performed by dividing cinnamon quills into four groups, which are then further divided into specific grades.

==== Vanilla ====
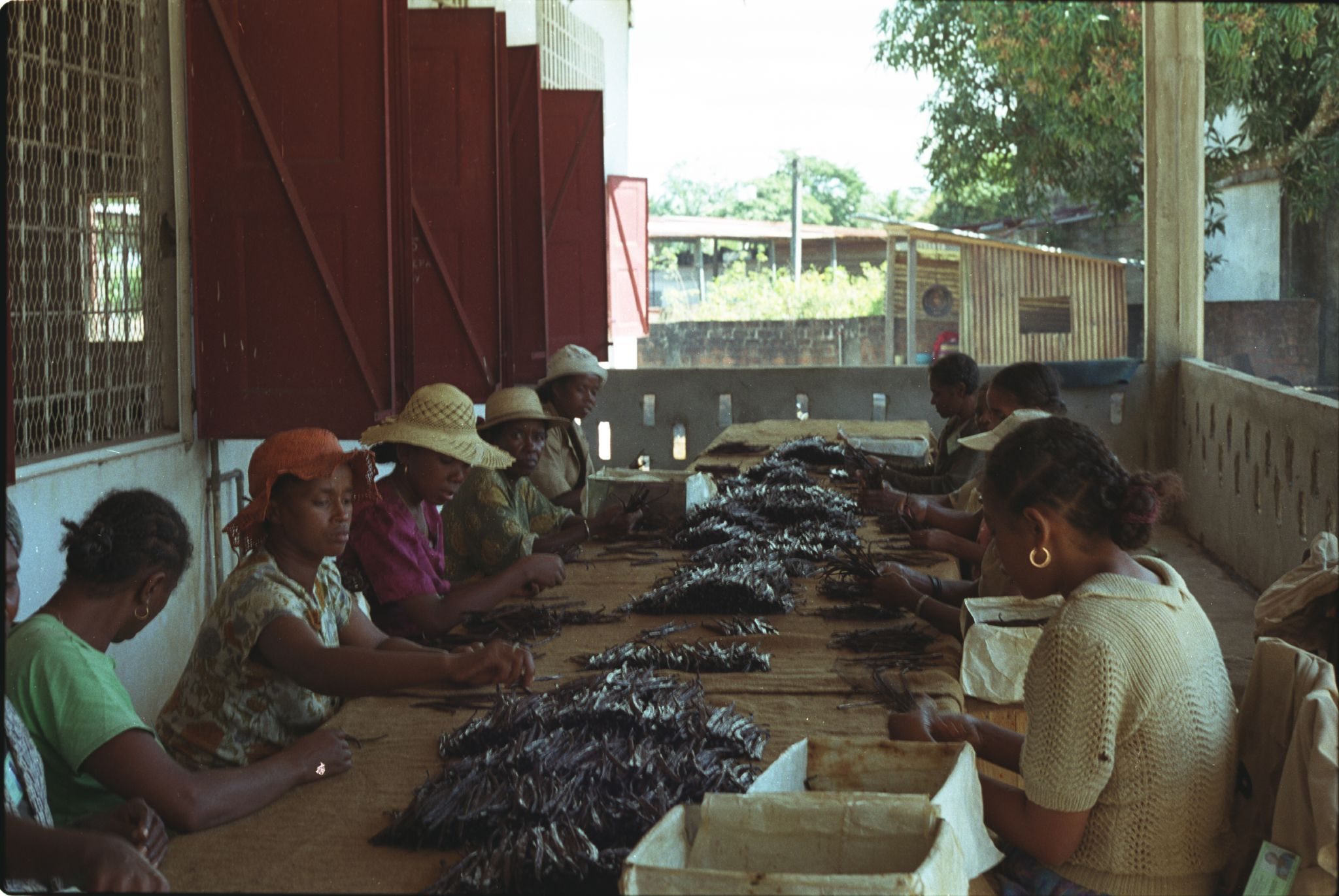
People grading vanilla beans in Sambava, Madagascar

Several vanilla fruit grading systems are in use. Each country which produces vanilla has its own grading system, and individual vendors, in turn, sometimes use their own criteria for describing the quality of the fruits they offer for sale.

=== Tea ===
In the western black tea industry, tea leaf grading is the process of evaluating products based on the quality and condition of the tea leaves themselves. The highest grades are referred to as "orange pekoe", and the lowest as "fannings" or "dust". This grading system is based upon the size of processed and dried black tea leaves. Despite a purported Chinese origin, these grading terms are typically used for teas from Sri Lanka, India and countries other than China; they are not generally known within Chinese-speaking countries.

==== Black tea ====
Black tea grading is usually based upon one of four scales of quality. Whole-leaf teas are the highest quality, followed by broken leaves, fannings, and dusts. Whole-leaf teas are produced with little or no alteration to the tea leaf. This results in a finished product with a coarser texture than that of bagged teas. Whole-leaf teas are widely considered the most valuable, especially if they contain leaf tips. Broken leaves are commonly sold as medium-grade loose teas. Smaller broken varieties may be included in tea bags.

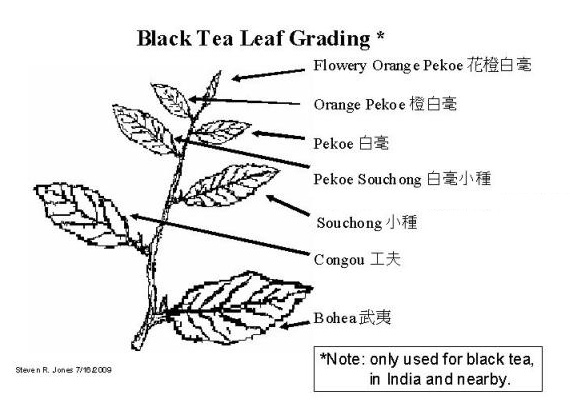
A black tea leaf grading diagram

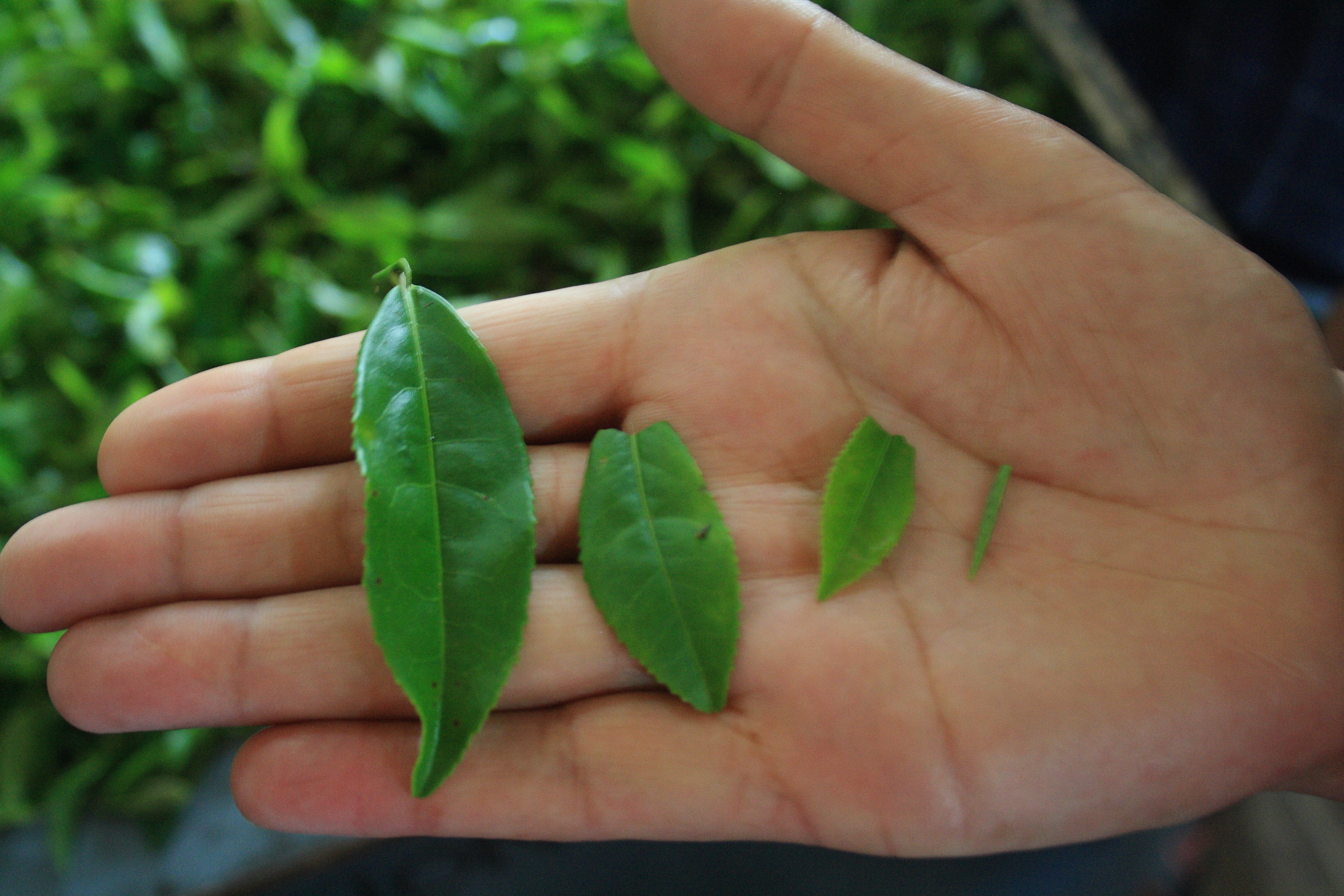
Fresh tea leaves of different sizes

==== Rooibos ====
Rooibos grades are largely related to the proportion of "needle" or leaf to stem content in the mix. A higher leaf content will result in a darker liquor, richer flavour and less "dusty" aftertaste. The high-grade rooibos is exported and does not reach local markets, with major consumers being in the EU, particularly Germany, where it is used in creating flavoured blends for loose-leaf tea markets. In development within South Africa are a small number of specialty tea companies producing similar blends.

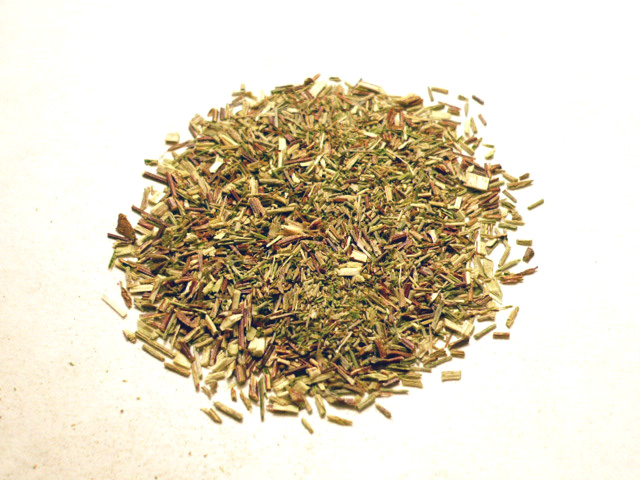
Organic green rooibos tea leaves

== Food additives and preservatives ==
=== Carrageenan ===
There are two basic grades of carrageenan, refined carrageenan (RC) and semi-refined carrageenan (SRC). In the United States, RC and SRC are both labeled as carrageenan. In the European Union, RC is designated by the E number E-407, and SRC is E-407a. RC has a 2% maximum for acid-insoluble material and is produced through an alcohol precipitation process or potassium chloride gel press process. SRC contains a much higher level of cellulosic content and is produced in a less complex process. Indonesia, the Philippines, and Chile are three main sources of raw material and extracted carrageenan.

=== Lye ===
Lye is used to cure foods such as lutefisk, olives (making them less bitter), canned mandarin oranges, hominy, lye rolls, century eggs, and pretzels. It is also used as a tenderizer in the crust of baked Cantonese mooncakes, and in lye-water "zongzi" (glutinous rice dumplings wrapped in bamboo leaves), chewy southern Chinese noodles popular in Hong Kong and southern China, and Japanese ramen noodles. In the United States, food-grade lye must meet the requirements outlined in the Food Chemicals Codex (FCC), as prescribed by the U.S. Food and Drug Administration (FDA). Lower grades of lye are commonly used as drain or oven cleaner. Such grades should not be used for food preparation, as they may contain impurities harmful to human health.

=== Sodium bisulphate ===
Sodium bisulphate is used as a food additive to leaven cake mixes (make them rise) as well as being used in meat and poultry processing and most recently in browning prevention of fresh-cut produce. The food-grade product meets the requirements set out in the Food Chemicals Codex. It is denoted by E number E514ii in the EU and is approved for use in Australia and New Zealand where it is listed as additive 514. Food-grade sodium bisulfate is used in a variety of food products, including beverages, dressings, sauces, and fillings.

== By country ==
- In India, AGMARK is a certification mark employed on agricultural products, assuring that they conform to a set of standards approved by the Directorate of Marketing and Inspection, an agency of the Government of India.

== See also ==
- Agricultural economics
- Food industry
- Food packaging
- Food safe symbol
- Food safety
- Food science
- Food technology
- Optical sorting
- Restaurant rating
