= Mittersill mine =

Tungsten mine in Mittersill, Salzburg, Austria

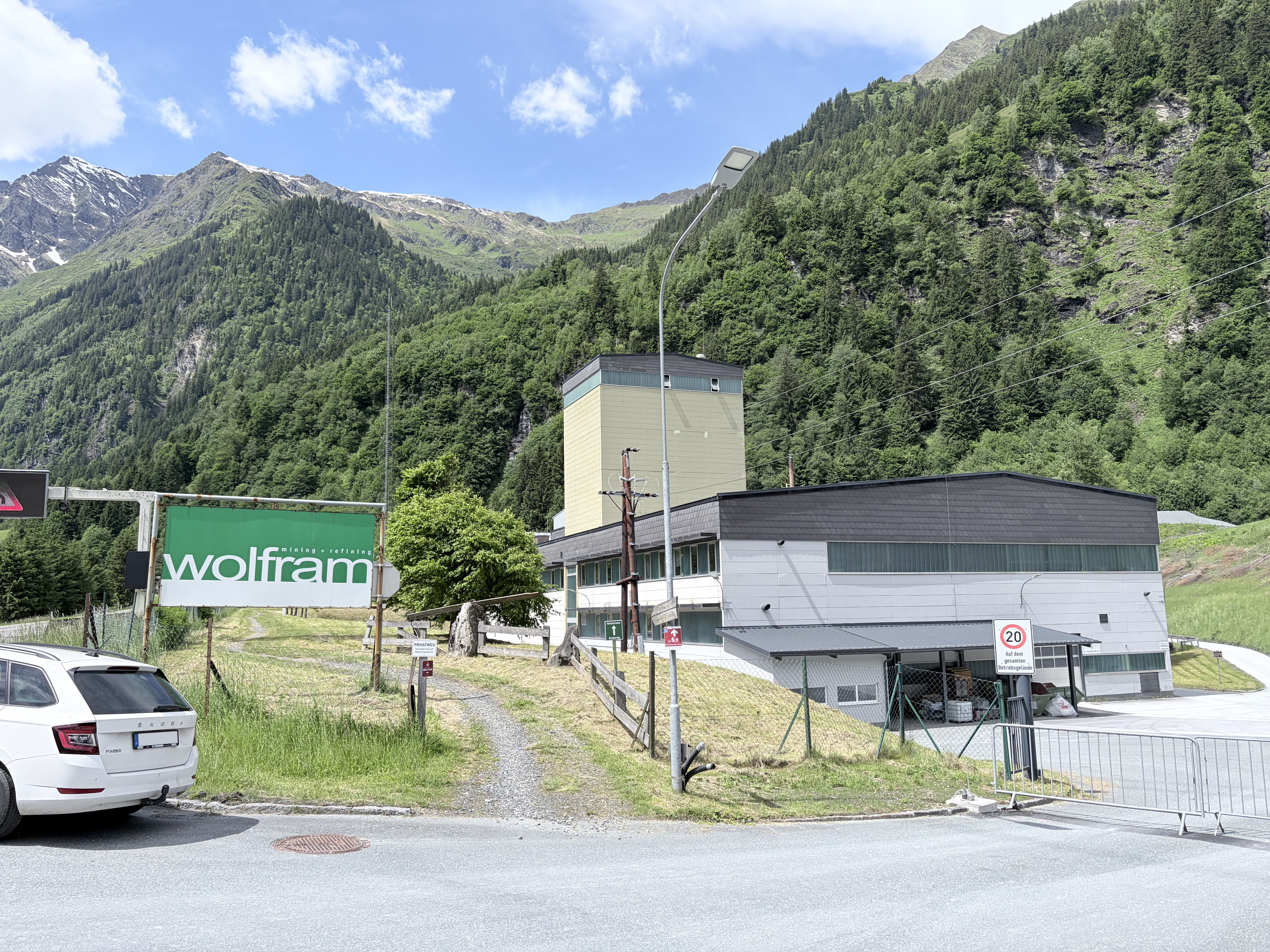
- Tungsten mine in Mittersill

- Location within Austria
- Location: Mittersill, Salzburg, Austria; 47°13′33.53″N 12°29′19.36″E
- Products: Tungsten
- Production: 1,200 tonnes of tungsten
- Financial year: 2009
- Opened: 1967
- Company: Wolfram Bergbau und Hütten

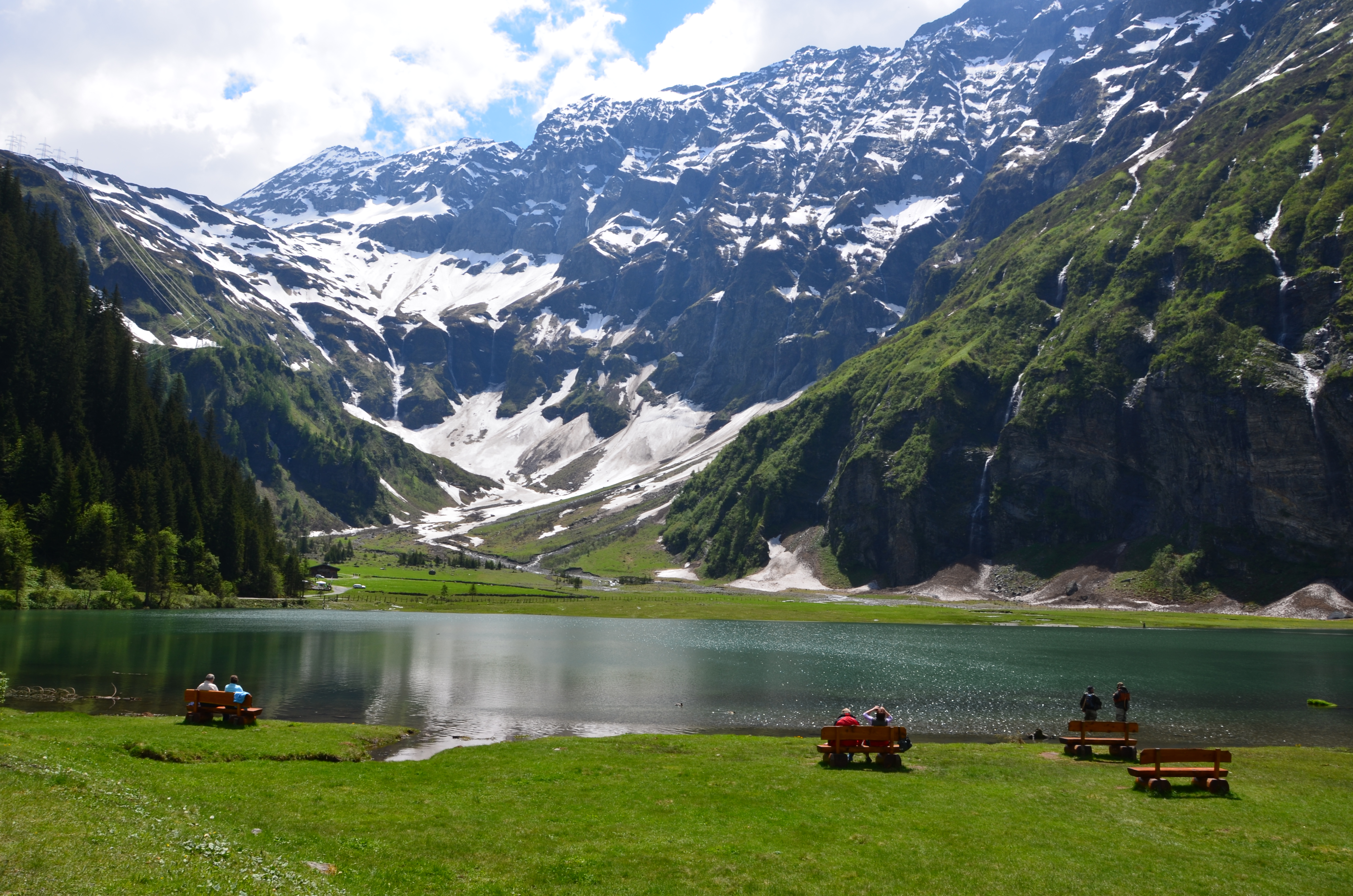

The Mittersill mine (also known as Felbertal Mine) is a large mine located south of the Mittersill town, in the State of Salzburg in western Austria, 30 kilometres (19 mi) South of Kitzbühel and some 340 kilometres (210 mi) southwest of the capital, Vienna. Mittersill is the largest scheelite deposit in Europe, having in 2010 estimated reserves of 6.1 million tonnes of ore grading 0.5% pure tungsten. The mine produces around 500.000 t ore grading 0.3 %WO_{3}, i.e., around 1,200 tonnes of WO_{3} per year (data from 2010 to 2017) .

== History ==
The deposit was discovered in 1967, with production starting in an open pit mine in the eastern field in 1976. Since 1986 only underground mining in the western field is performed.

== Geology and ore deposit genesis ==
The Mittersill deposit hosted in Early Palaeozoic metamorphic rocks, mainly in metabasites of the central Tauern Window, which were intruded by numerous granites during the Variscan orogeny (~340–290 Ma) and subsequently metamorphosed during the Alpine orogeny (~30 Ma). Scheelite is accompanied by pyrrhotite, pyrite, chalcopyrite, molybdenite, apatite and beryl; less common are minerals of the tungstenite‐molybdenite solid solution, marcasite, galena, arsenopyrite, sphalerite, pentlandite, magnetite and hematite. Several sulfosaltss, partly of bismuth occur too, as well as native bismuth.

The ideas on the genesis of the Mittersill scheelite deposit have strongly changed since its discovery. Whereas in the early days, mainly on the basis of its partly stratiform morphology, the deposit was interpreted as syngenetic and caused by submarine exhalative activity related to Early Paleozoic basaltic rocks, recent authors have accumulated evidences favoring an epigenetic ore formation by hydrothermal fluids derived from a Late Paleozoic granite.
