= Boterwet =

Dutch law

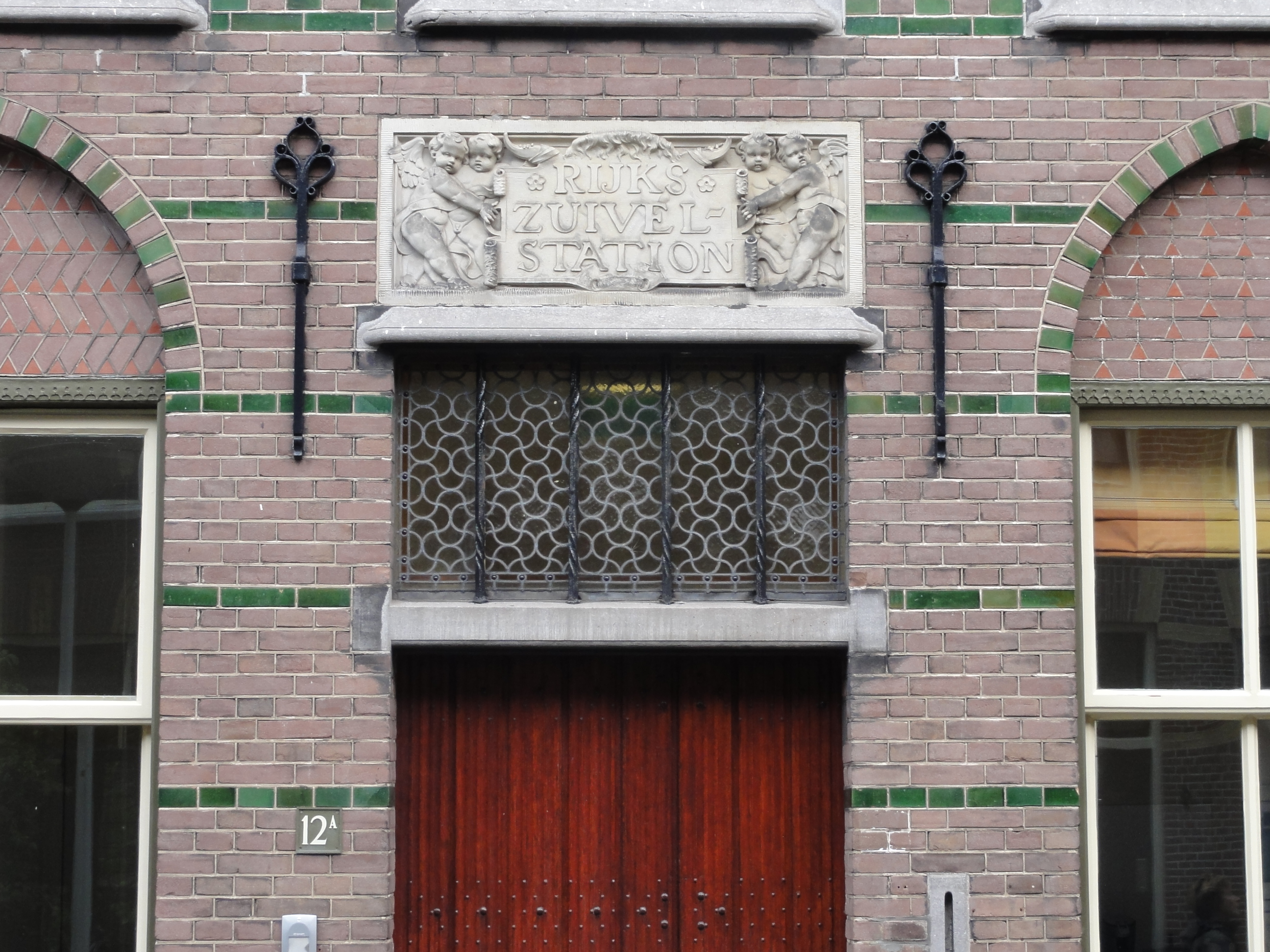
The Rijkszuivelstation in Leiden, which was for many years the location of laboratory research and testing required by the Boterwet

The Boterwet was a Dutch law providing for the regulation of manufacturing and controlling the sale of butter.

It was first enacted in 1889, and was partly based upon the British Margarine Act 1887, which had in turn been based upon the Danish Margarine Law 1885. All were nominally aimed at preventing the adulteration of butter with margarine (and other foodstuffs), but had been the result of lobbying by the dairy farming industry, which had come to regard the newly invented oleomargarine as a threat to dairy farmers' livelihoods.
