= Screw cap =

Type of closure for bottles

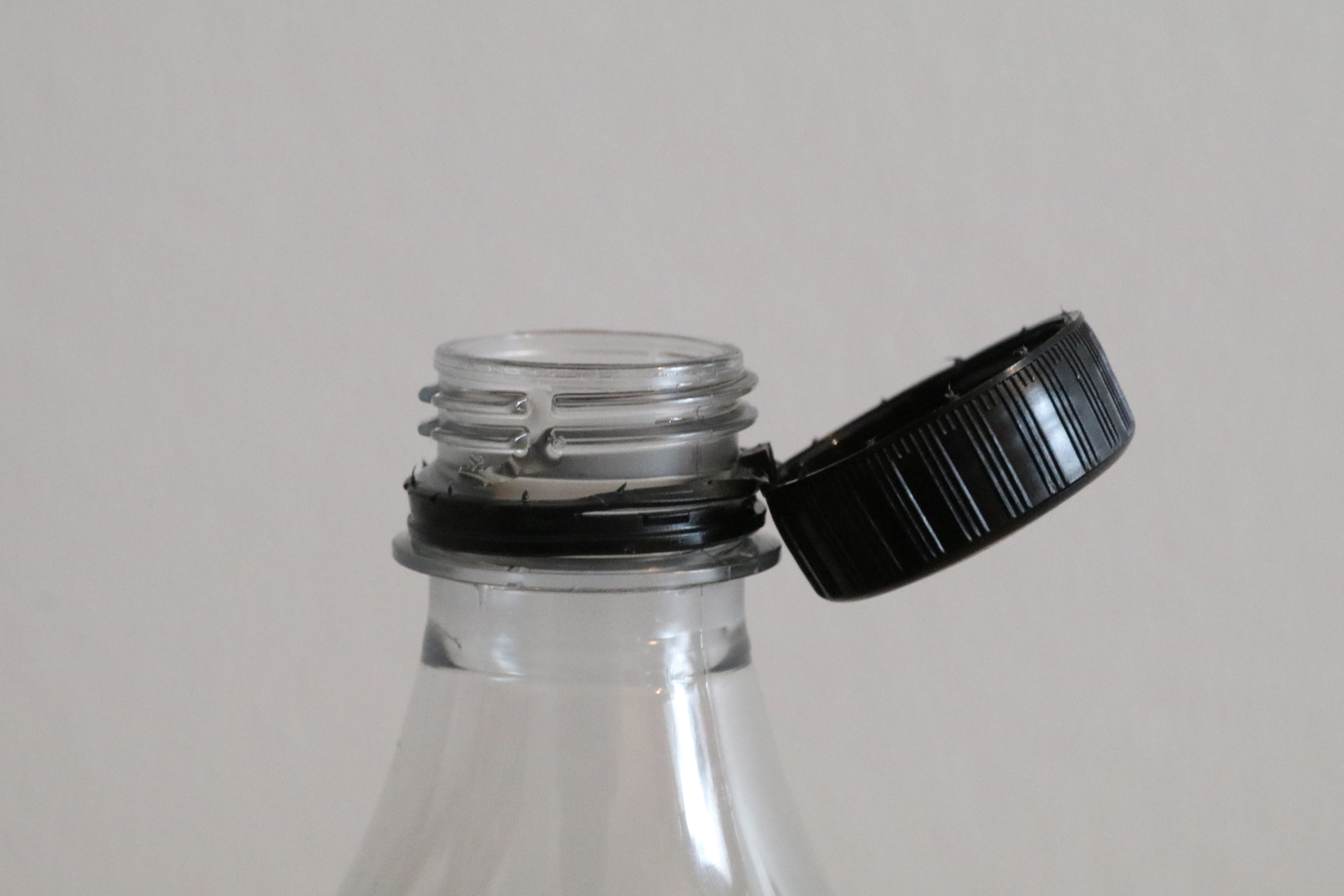
A PCO 1881 screw cap on a plastic bottle

A screw cap or closure is a common type of closure for bottles, jars, and tubes.

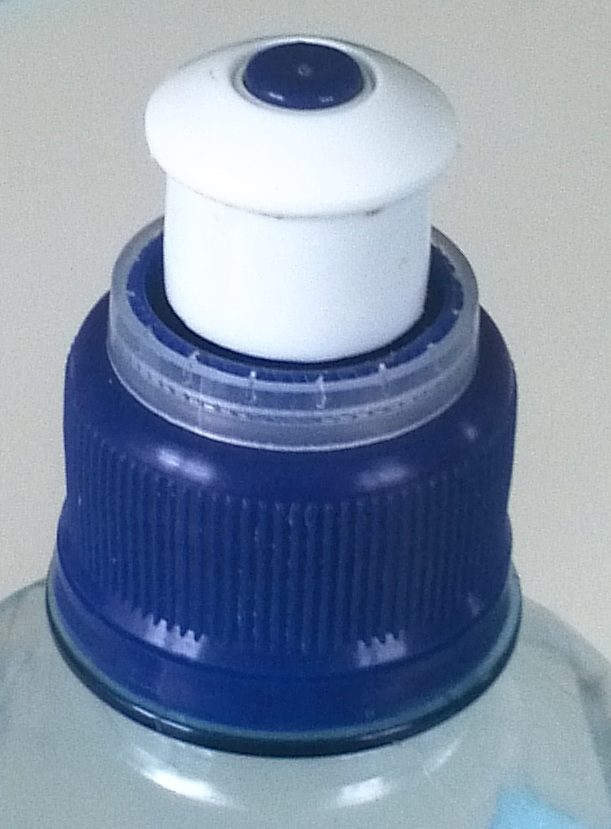
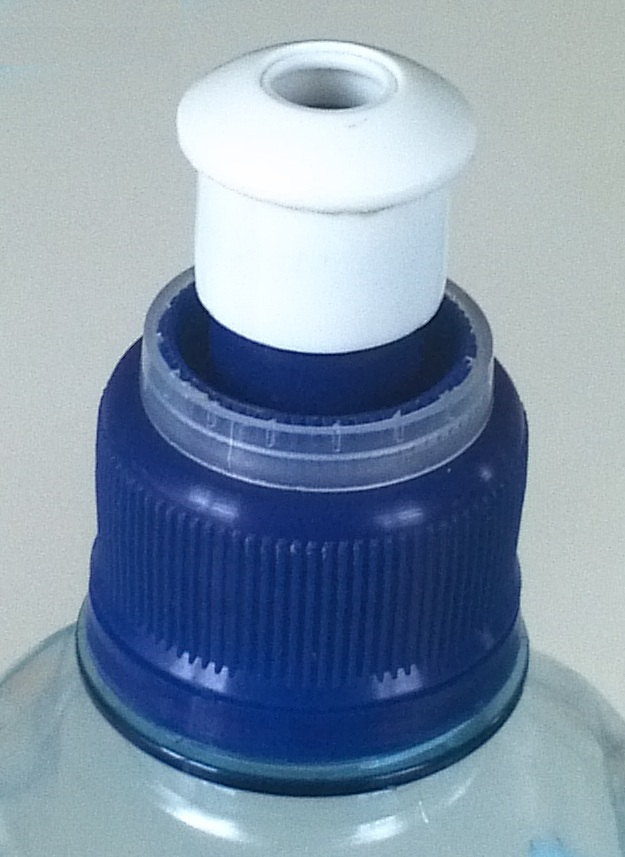
A "sports cap", which appears on many water bottles, seen in closed configuration at left and in open configuration at right, allowing the water to pass around the central blue piece.

== History ==
Screw caps had been used in Europe since the 1500s and a British patent was filed in 1810 by Peter Durand acting on behalf of Nicolas Appert. In 1858, John Landis Mason patented a screw-on lid for a jar that became known as the Mason jar.

The screws and caps on PET beverage bottles were standardized in the 2000s by the International Society of Beverage Technologists (ISBT) as the voluntary standard PCO 1881, replacing the older and taller PCO 1810 standard.

== Usage ==
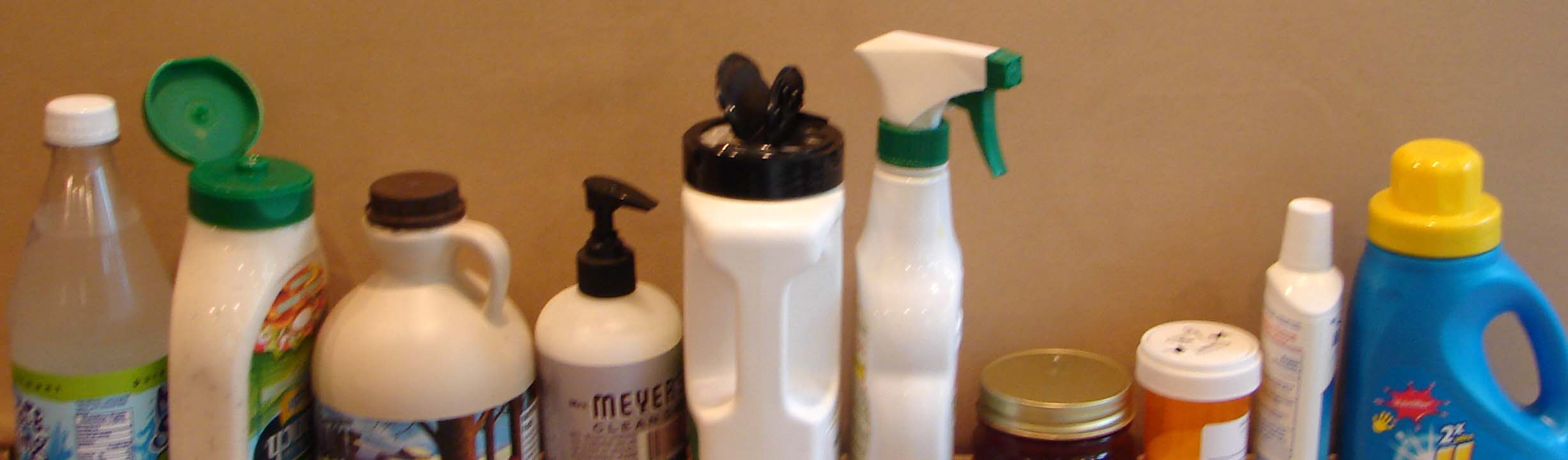
Common screw closures (from left to right): Plastic bottle with plastic screw cap, Dispensing closure for salad dressing (with inner seal), Break-away closure for syrup, Dispensing pump closure, Dispensing closure (with inner seal), Spray pump, Metal closure on glass jar, Child resistant closure, Cap on toothpaste, Measuring cap

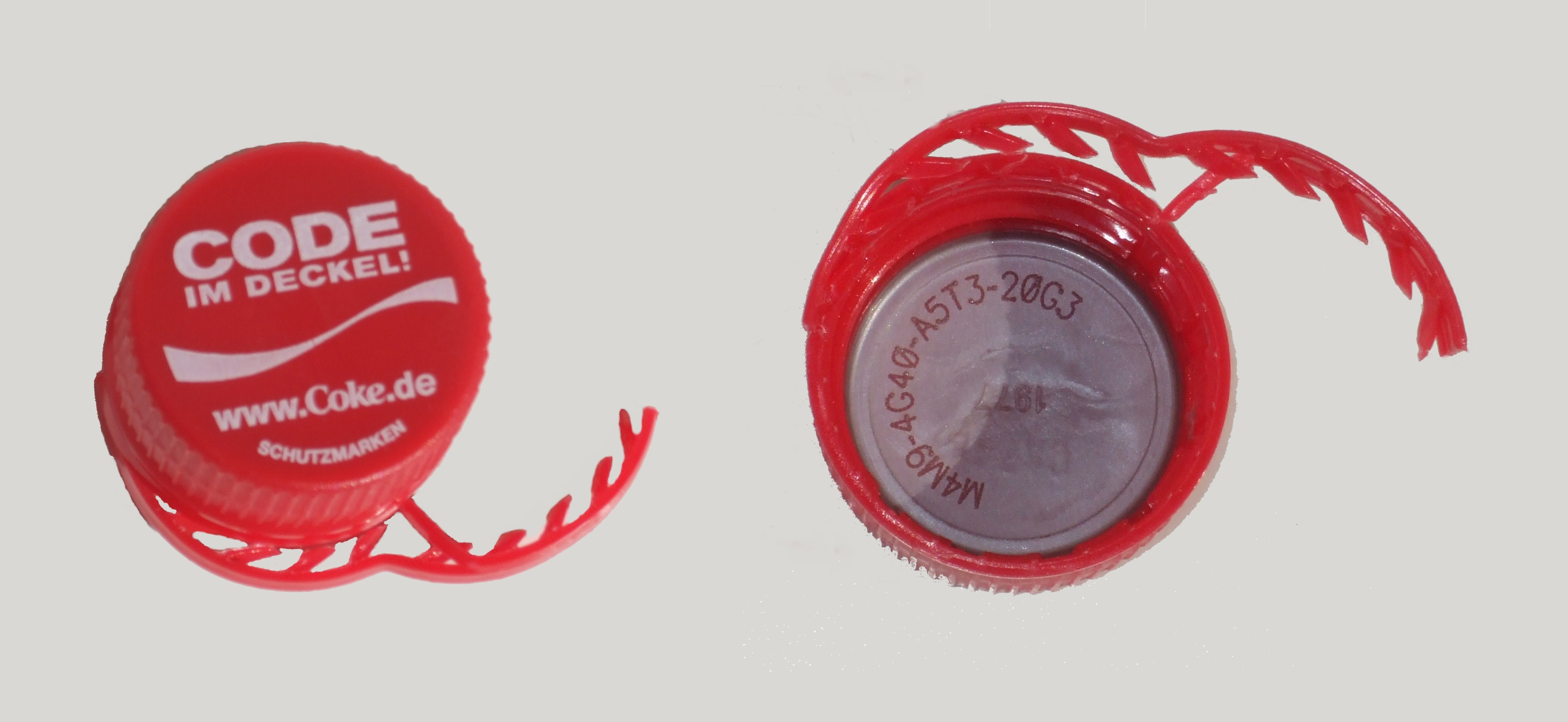
plastic screw cap with break-away tamper-evident band

A screw closure is a mechanical device which is screwed on and off of a "finish" on a container. Either continuous threads or lugs are used. It must be engineered to be cost-effective, to provide an effective seal (and barrier), to be compatible with the contents, to be easily opened by the consumer, often to be reclosable, and to comply with product, package, and environmental laws and regulations. Manufacturers may ensure the integrity of a screw cap using a cap torque tester. Some closures need to be tamper resistant and have child-resistant packaging features. A tamper-evident band is a common tamper warning for screw caps of bottles, for example.

== Wine industry ==
Screw caps' use as an alternative to cork for sealing wine bottles is gaining increasing support. A screw cap is a metal cap that screws onto threads on the neck of a bottle, generally with a metal skirt down the neck to resemble the traditional wine capsule ("foil"). A layer of plastic (often PVDC), cork, rubber, or other soft material is used as wad to make a seal with the mouth of the bottle.

== Sake industry ==
Sake bottles are almost universally closed with screw caps (some are packed in barrels, or novelty bottles).

== See also ==
- Bottle cap
- Child-resistant packaging
- Closure & Container Manufacturers Association
- Closure (container)
- Flip-top
- Packaging
- Permeation
- Screw cap (wine)
- Tethered cap
- GPI container finish standards which includes screw caps for glass containers.

== Sources ==
- Soroka, W, "Fundamentals of Packaging Technology", IoPP, 2002, ISBN 1-930268-25-4
- Yam, K. L., "Encyclopedia of Packaging Technology", John Wiley & Sons, 2009, ISBN 978-0-470-08704-6
- Prlewe, J. Wine from Grape to Glass. NY: Abbeville Press, 1999.
- Wayne J. Mortensen and Brian K. Marks, The Failure of a Wine Closure Innovation: A Strategic Marketing Analysis,
- ASTM D3474 Standard Practice for Calibration and Use of Torque Meters Used in Packaging Applications
