= Closure (container) =

Devices and techniques used to close containers

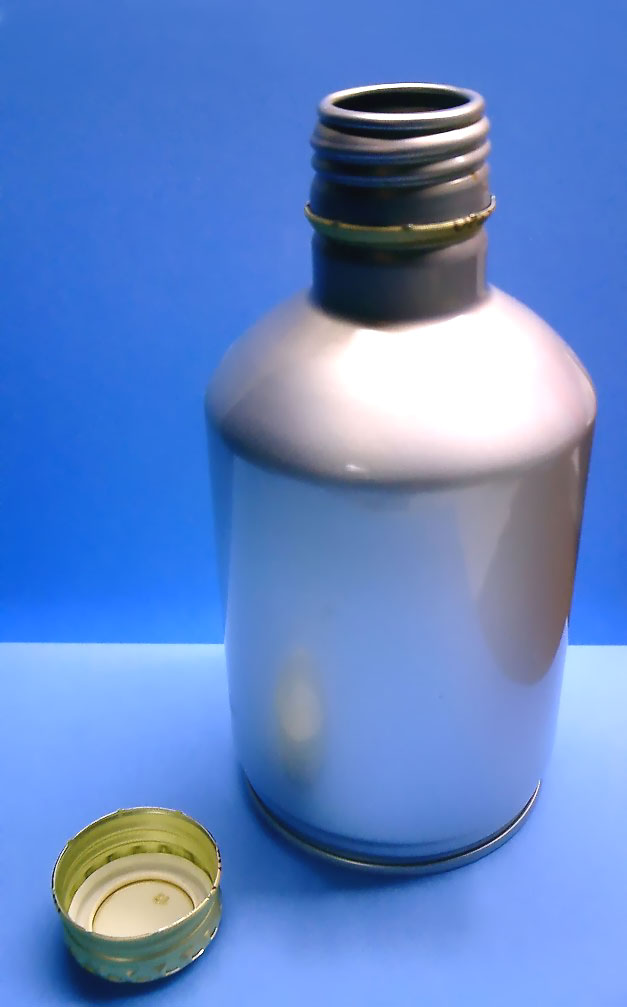
An aluminum bottle with a threaded aluminum screw closure

A closure is a device used to close or seal a container, such as a bottle, jug, jar, tube, or can. A closure may be a cap, cover, lid, plug, liner, or the like. The part of the container to which the closure is applied is called the finish.

Other types of containers, such as boxes and drums, may also have closures, but are not discussed in this article. Many containers and packages require a means of closing, which can be a separate device or seal, or sometimes an integral latch or lock.

== Purpose of closures ==
The closure is often the most critical part of a package, and must fulfill all of the basic functions of packaging in addition to being easy to open and (if applicable) reclose.

Depending on the contents and container, closures have several functions:

- Keep the container closed and the contents contained for the specified shelf life until time of opening
- Provide a barrier to dirt, oxygen, moisture, etc. Control of permeation is critical to many types of products: foods, chemicals, etc.
- Keep the product secure from undesired premature opening
- Provide a means of reclosing or reusing the container
- Assist in the dispensing and use of the product
- Allow reasonable ease to open the container by the intended user. Difficult to open containers may cause wrap rage. The force or torque required to open a closure is an important consideration for packaging engineers.

Many types of packaging with their closures are regulated for strength, safety, security, communication, recycling, and environmental requirements, plus many others.

== Types of closures ==
Closures need a means of attaching to the container with sufficient security. Threads, lugs, hinges, locks, adhesives, etc. are used. Many plastic closures are made by injection molding.

Many closures need to have the ability to adjust to slight manufacturing variations in the container and the closure structure. Some closures are made of flexible material such as cork, rubber, or plastic foam. Often, an O-ring or a closure liner (gasket made of pulp or foam cap liner) is used. Linerless closures often use a deformable plastic rim or structure to maintain the seal.

Secondary seals are common with sensitive products that may deteriorate, or where extra security is needed. Foil or plastic inner seals are used on some bottles. Heat sealed lidding films are used on some tubs. External shrink bands, labels, and tapes are sometimes used outside the primary closure structure. Additionally, many closures feature ventilation to prevent bloating, collapse, or explosion due to unequalized pressure during processing or storage. Venting technologies utilize common materials such as PTFE, PP, etc. These elements are preferred due to their ability to withstand temperatures of 260 °C and water intrusion pressure levels of 770 mbar.

=== Screw top ===
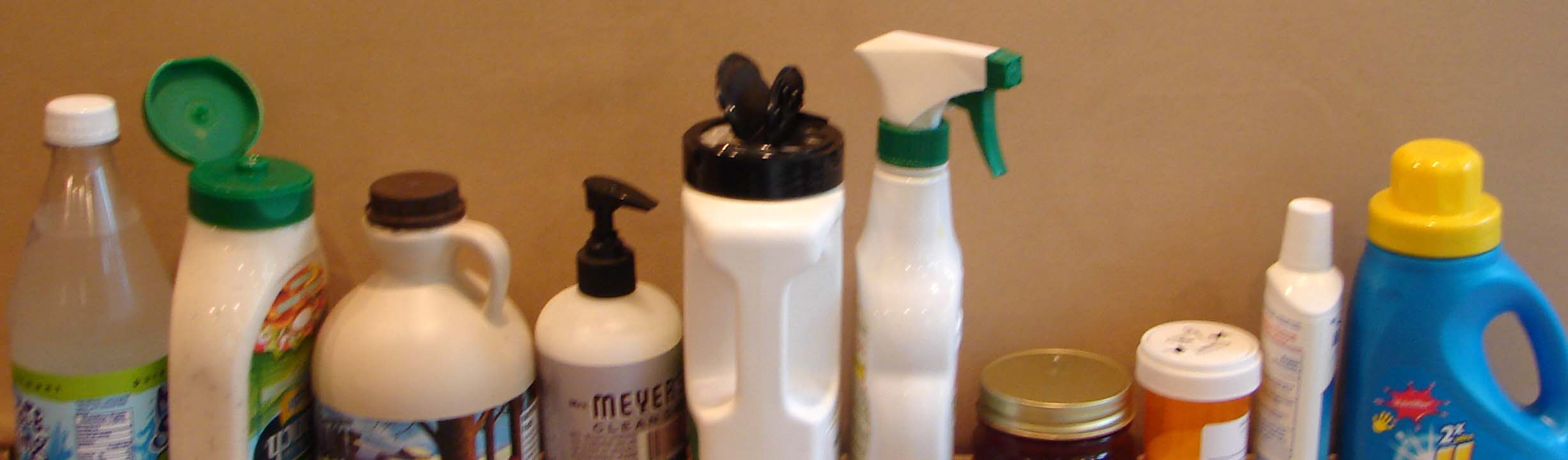
Closures

A screw closure is a mechanical device which is screwed on and off a threaded "finish" on a container. Either continuous threads (C-T) or lugs are used. Metal caps can be either preformed, or, in some instances, rolled on after application. Plastic caps may use several types of molded polymer.

Some screw tops have multiple pieces. For example, a mason jar often has a lid with a built in rubbery seal and a separate threaded ring or band.

=== Crown cap ===
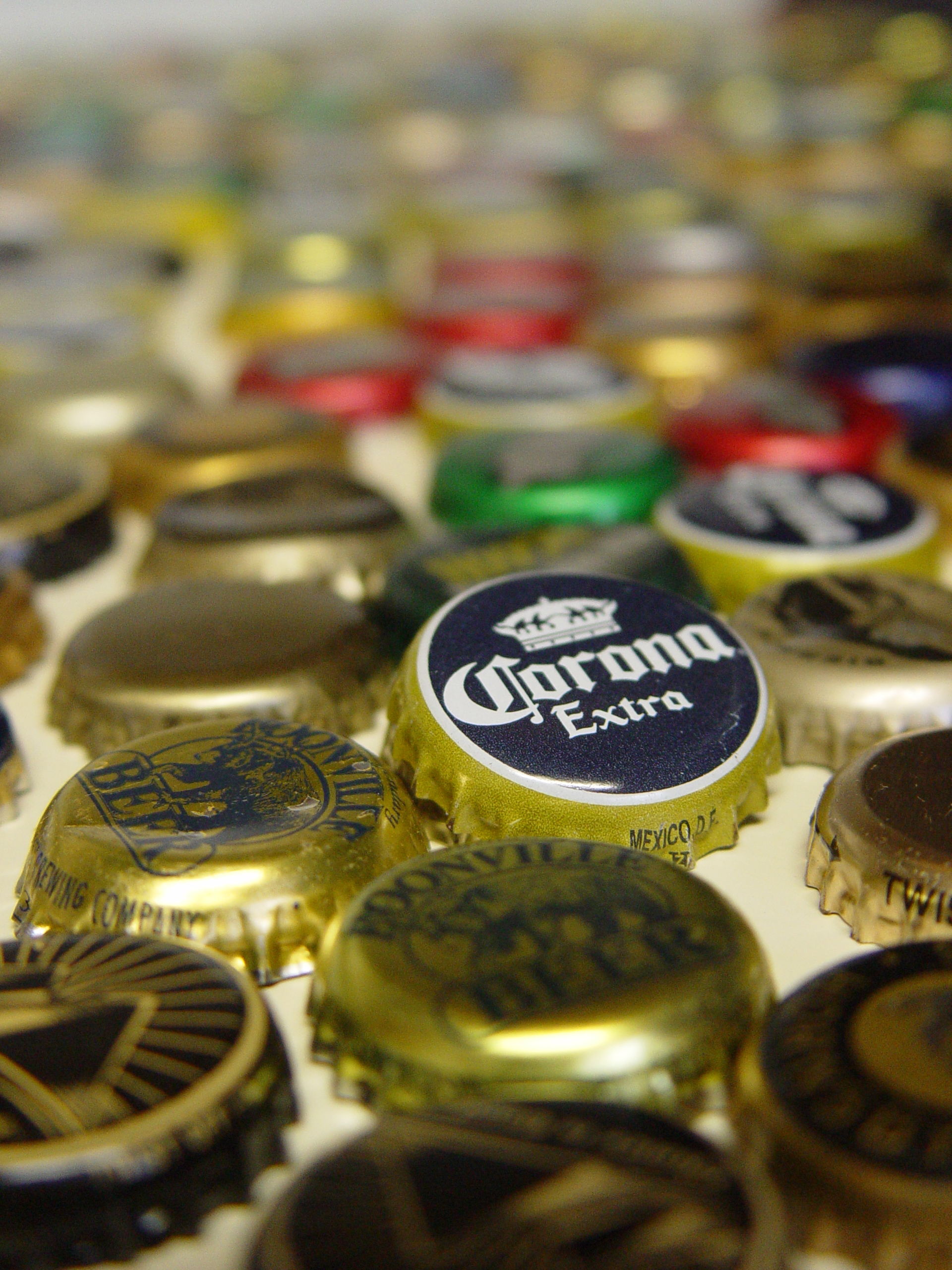
Crown caps

Beverage bottles are frequently closed with crown beverage caps. These are shallow metal caps that are crimped into locking position around the head of the bottle.

=== Snap on ===
Some closures snap on. For opening, the top is designed to pry off, or break off, or have a built in dispenser.

=== Friction fit ===
Some containers have a loose lid as a closure. Laboratory glassware often has ground glass joints that allow the pieces to be fitted together easily.

An interference fit or friction fit requires some force to close and open, providing additional security. Paint cans often have a friction fit plug.

=== Tamper-evident ===
Resistance to tampering is required for some types of products. Container closures can be one of several layers of packaging to deter tampering and to provide evidence of attempts at tampering. *Sometimes, tamper resistance is obtained by a tamper-evident band; separate or integral with the closure.

=== Dispensing ===
A wide variety of convenience dispensing features can be built into closures. Spray bottles and cans with aerosol spray (valves, actuators) have special closure requirements. Pour spouts, triggers, sprayer caps, measuring attachments, sifting devices, etc. are common caps.

=== Spray bottle ===
A spray bottle is a bottle that can dispense, squirt, spray, or mist fluids. A common use for spray bottles is dispensing cool cleaners, cosmetics, and chemical specialties.

=== Child-resistant ===
Child-resistant packaging, or C-R packaging, has special closures designed to reduce the risk of children ingesting dangerous items. This is often accomplished by the use of a special safety cap. It is required by regulation for prescription drugs, over-the-counter medications, pesticides, and household chemicals.

== Examples ==
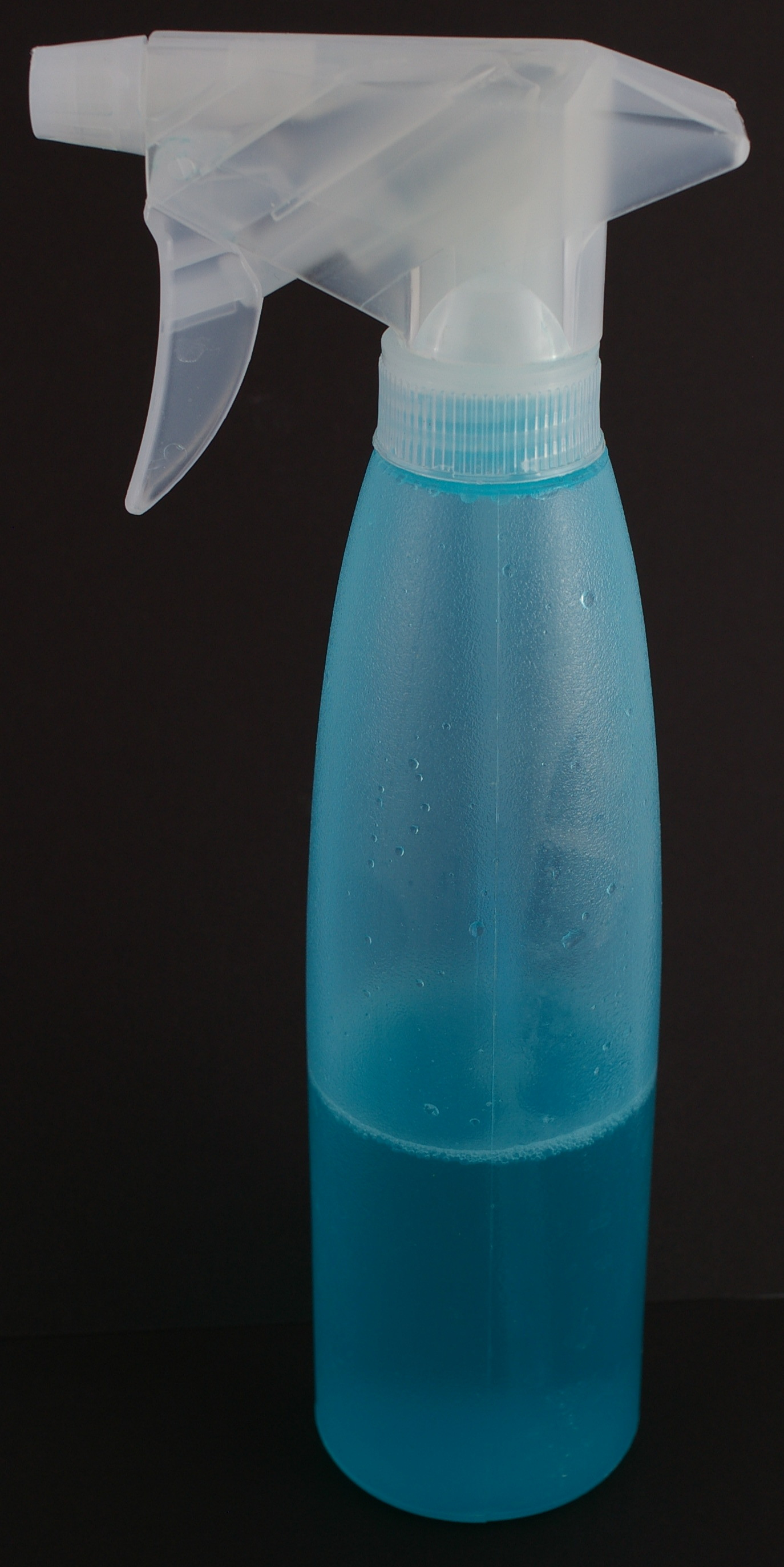
Spray bottle cap

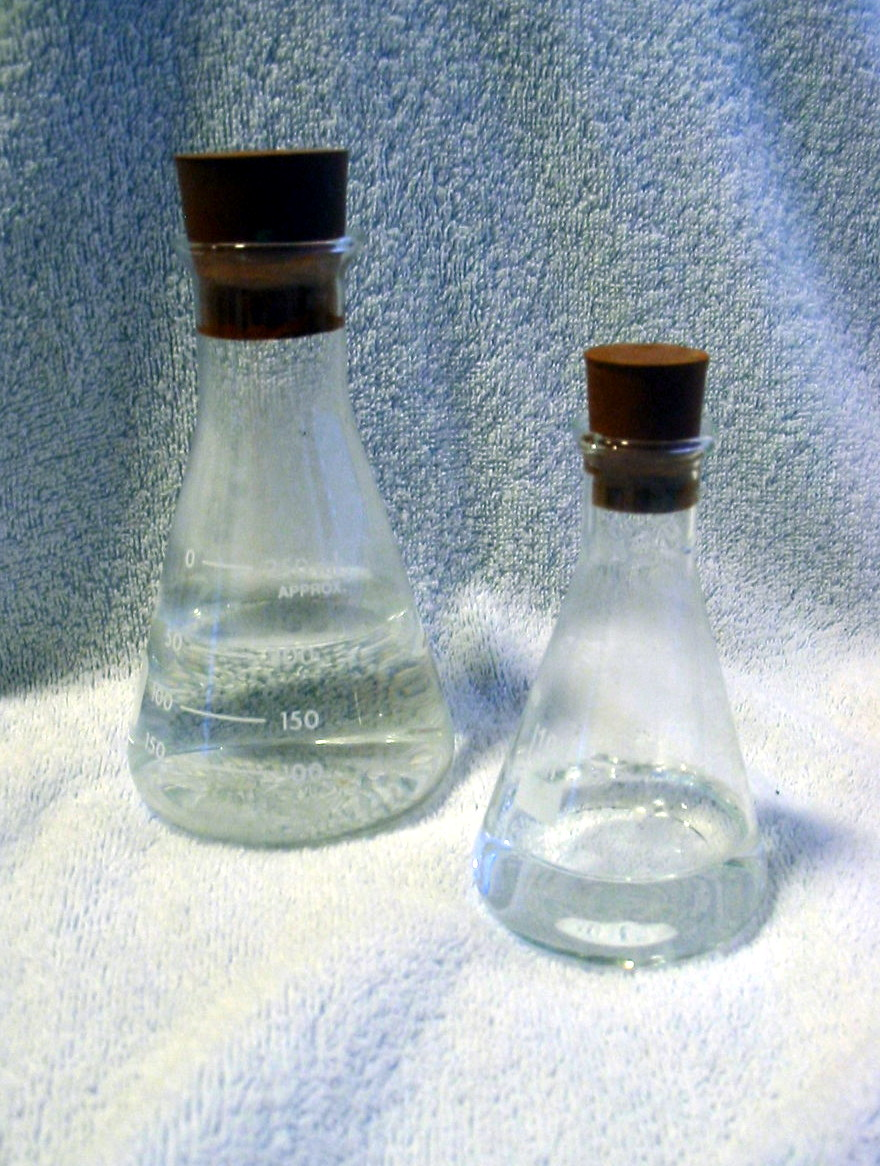
rubber stoppers on flasks

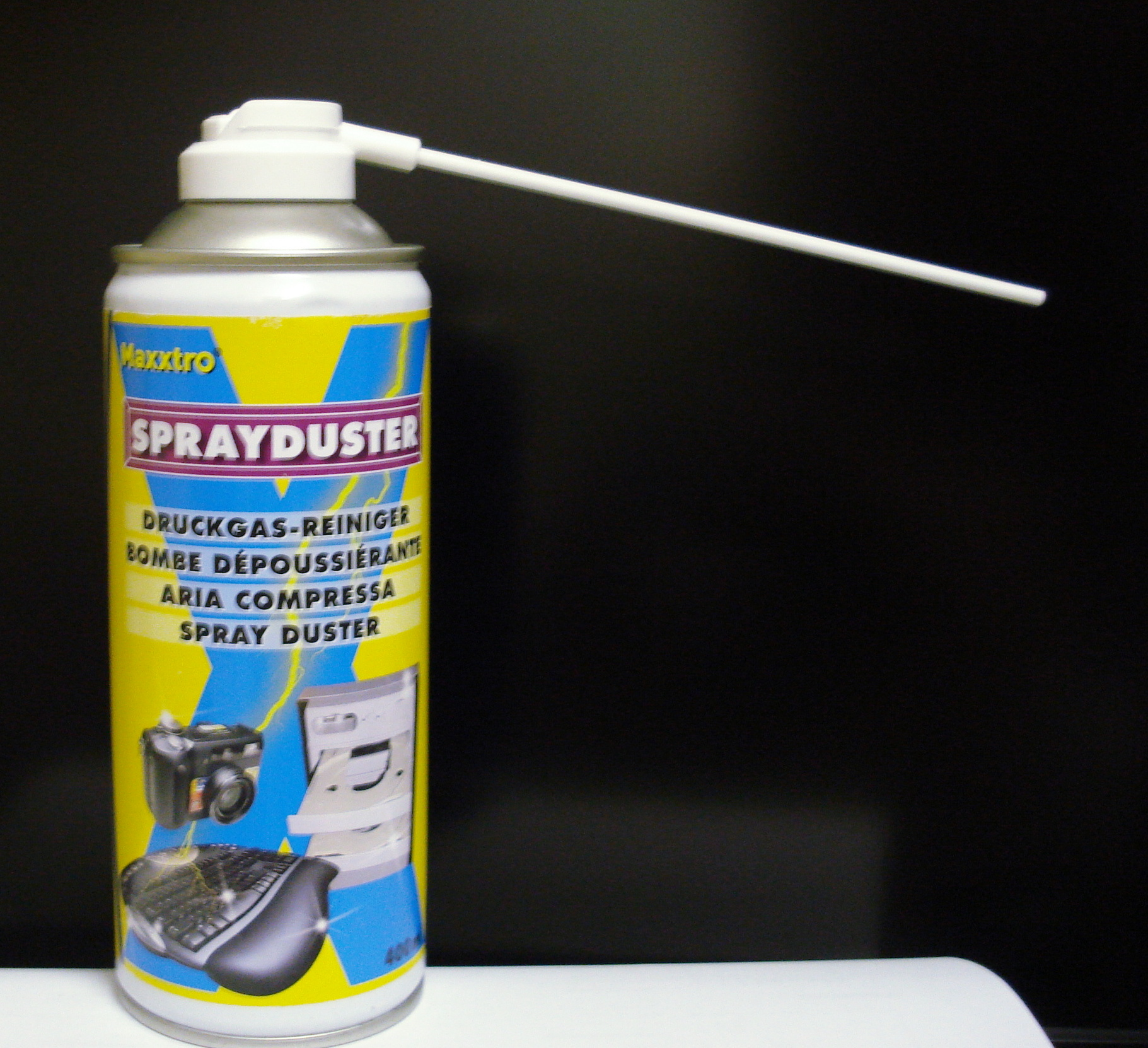
spray duster with long tube for dispensing

Closure and roll-on device for deodorant

Inverted ketchup bottle with innerseal and dispensing closure

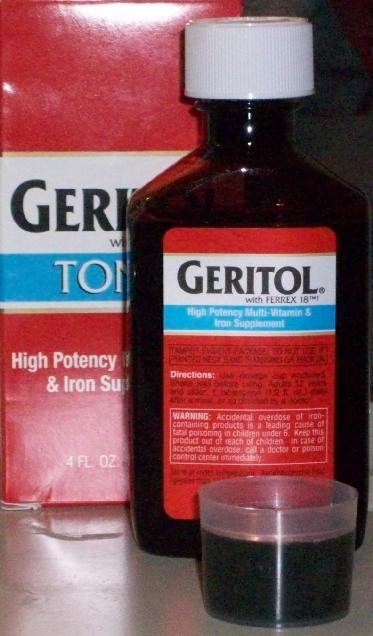
Bottle of Geritol with a child-resistant cap

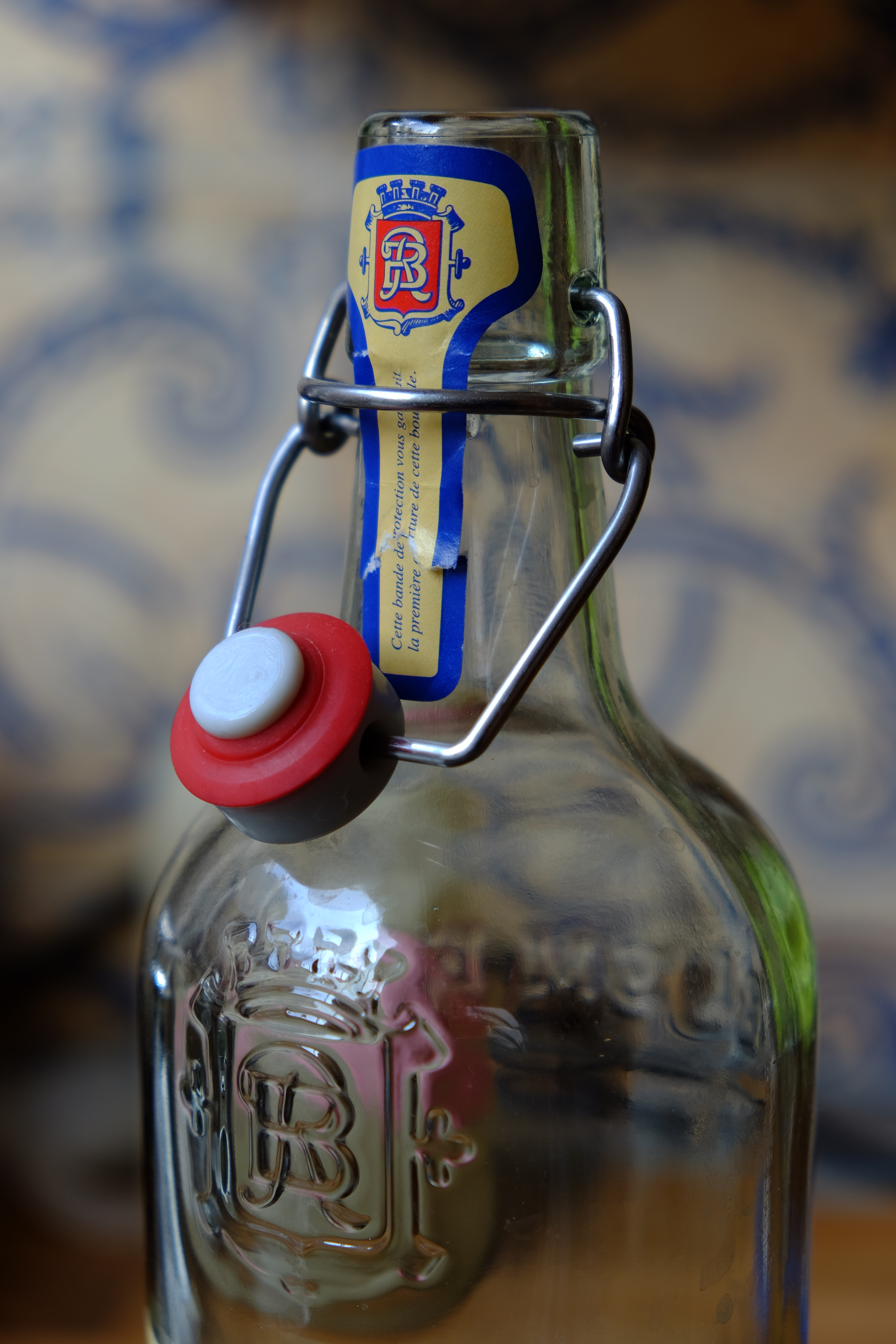
An opened flip-top bottle closure

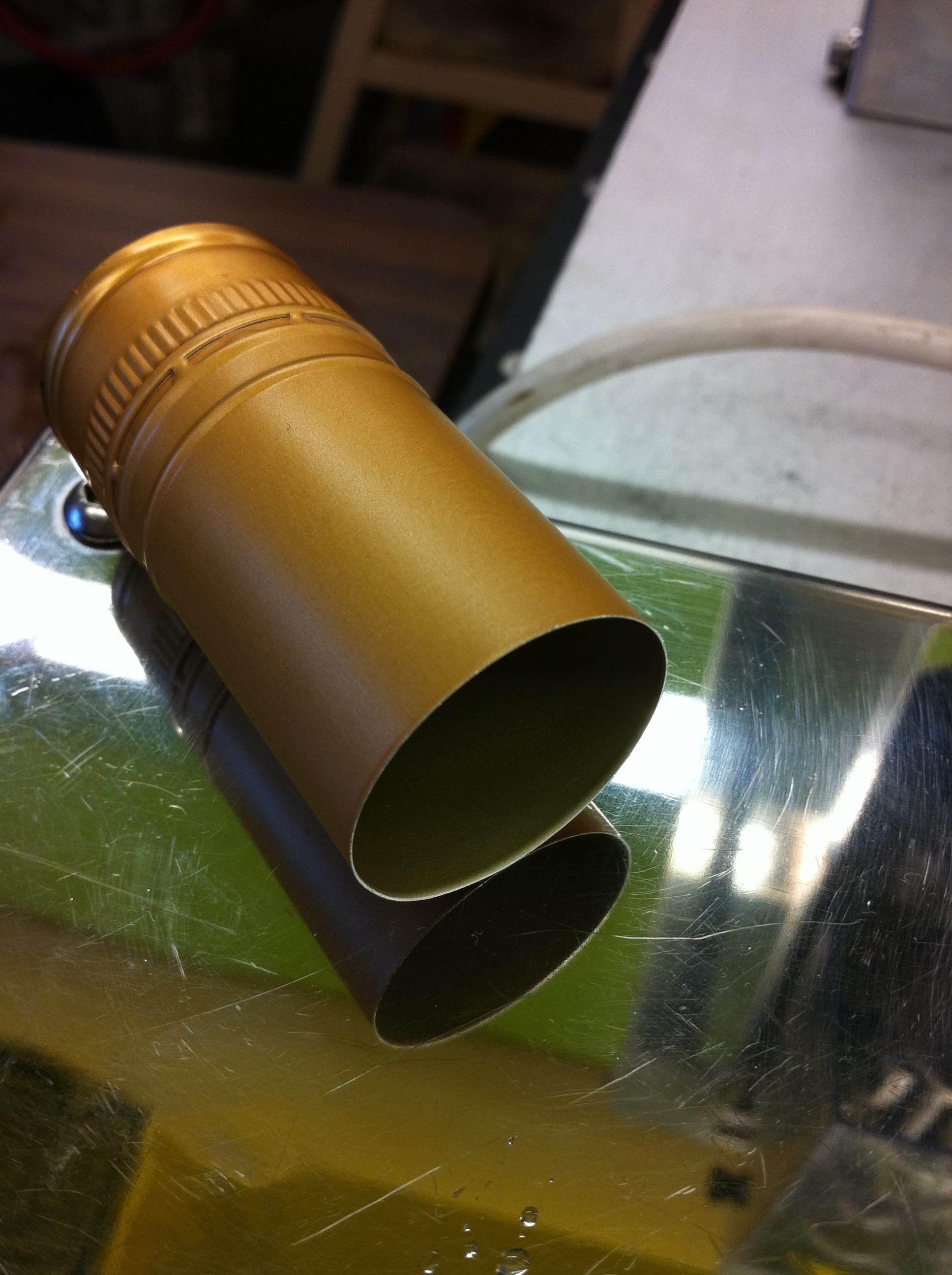
A screw cap capsule is fitted onto a wine bottle and heat shrunk tightly

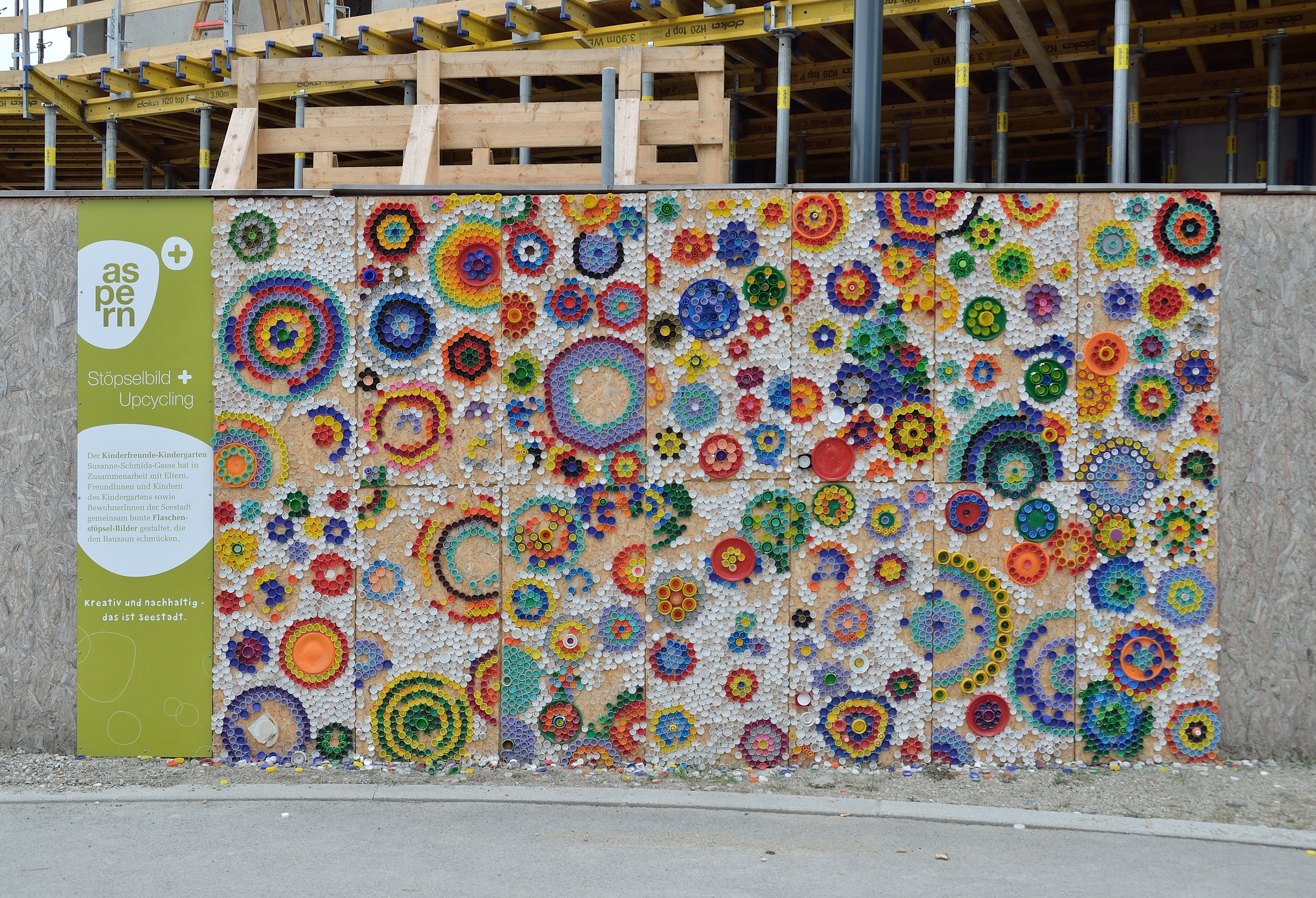
Recycled bottle stoppers as art in Vienna

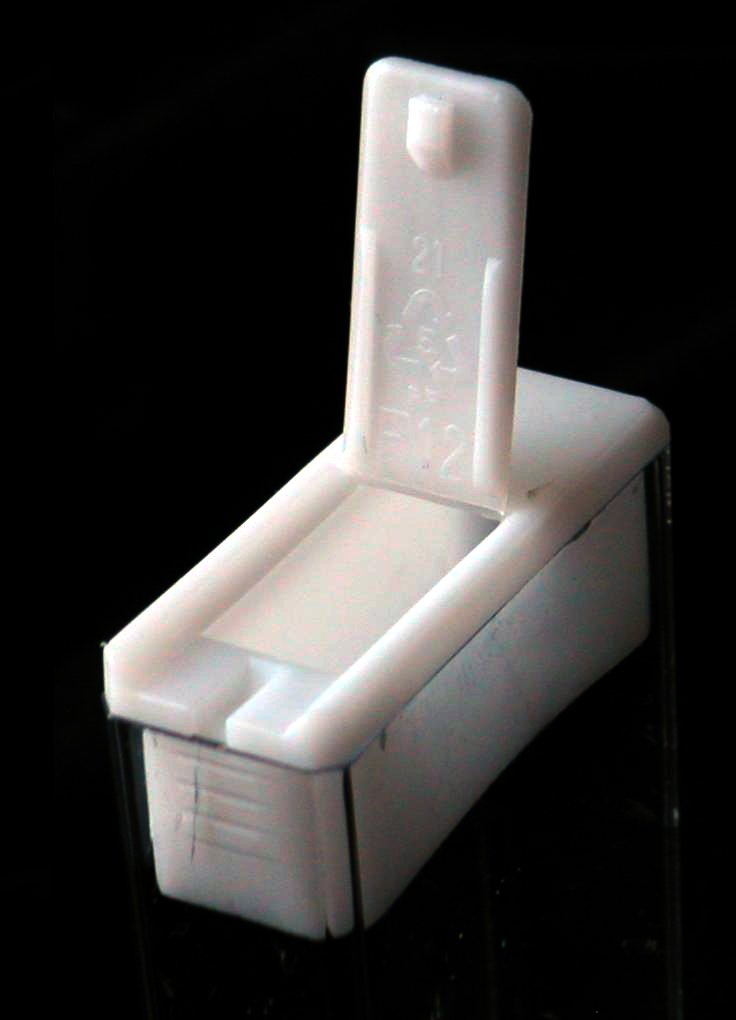
A living hinge on the lid of a Tic Tac box

== History ==
Early pottery and ceramic containers often had lids that fit reasonably snug onto the body of the container. The narrow necks of ancient amphoras were closed with a plug of cork, wood, or ceramic and sealed with mortar. Wooden barrels often had bungholes closed by cork or wood bungs.

Some early tinplate cans were made with threaded necks for screw top closures.

Beverage bottles started using the Hutter Stopper in 1893. This involved a porcelain plug fitted with a rubber washer, which was then forced down into the lip of the bottle. This technique only works with carbonated beverages. The Hutter Stopper became standard in beer bottling in the late 1890s / early 1900s. Bail closures on bottles were invented by Henry William Putnam in 1859. These involved heavy wire bail attached to a bottle's neck that swung over the cork to hold it in.

The world's first modern bottle cap, the crown cork, was invented by William Painter in 1890, in Baltimore. The screw cap, using rust resistant aluminum, was first used in prescription drug bottling in the 1920s. Molded urea based bottle caps were first introduced in the early 1900s.

A history of accidents involving children opening household packaging and ingesting the contents led the US Congress to pass the Poison Prevention Packaging Act of 1970.

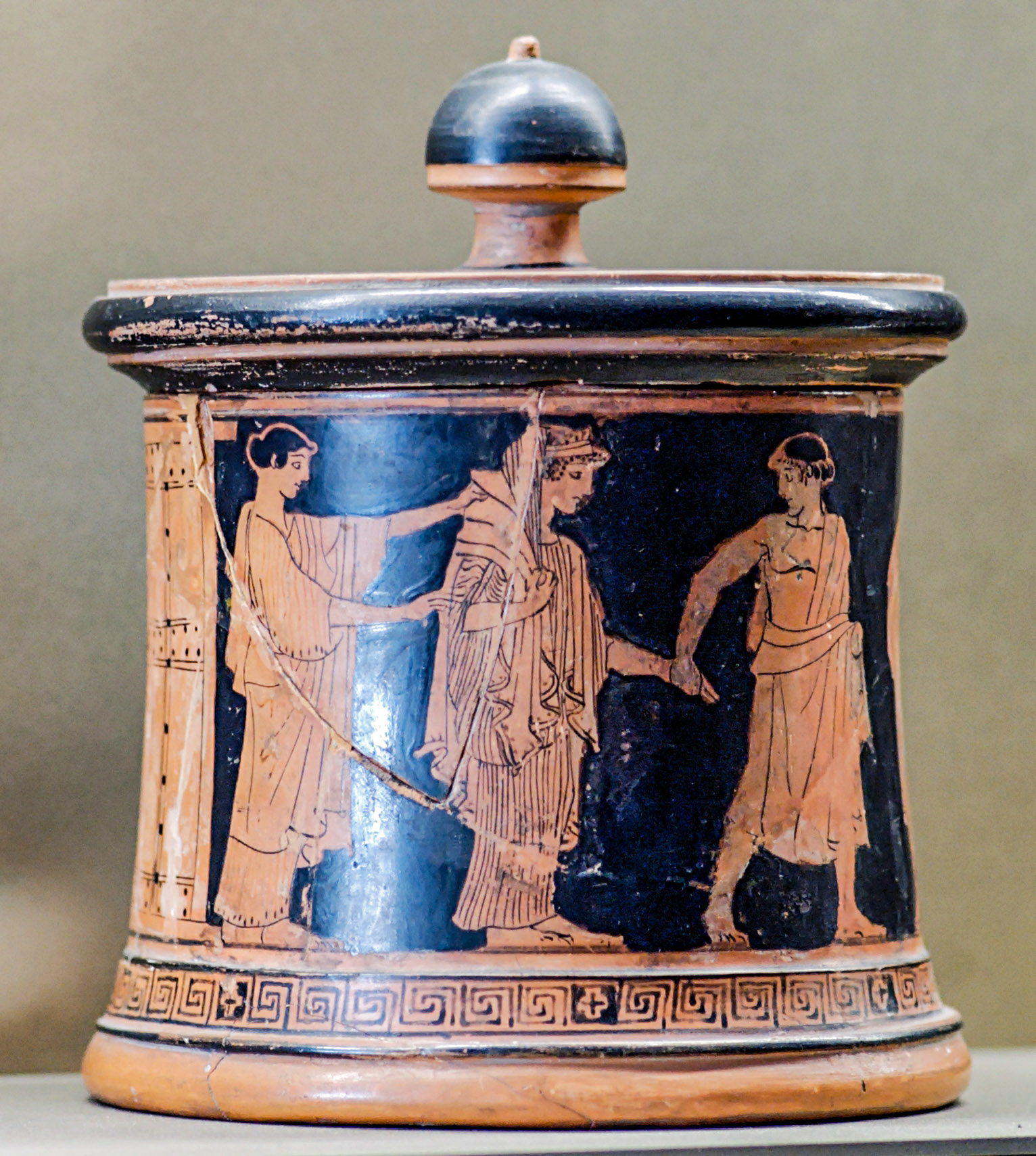
Greek pottery with lid, 5th century

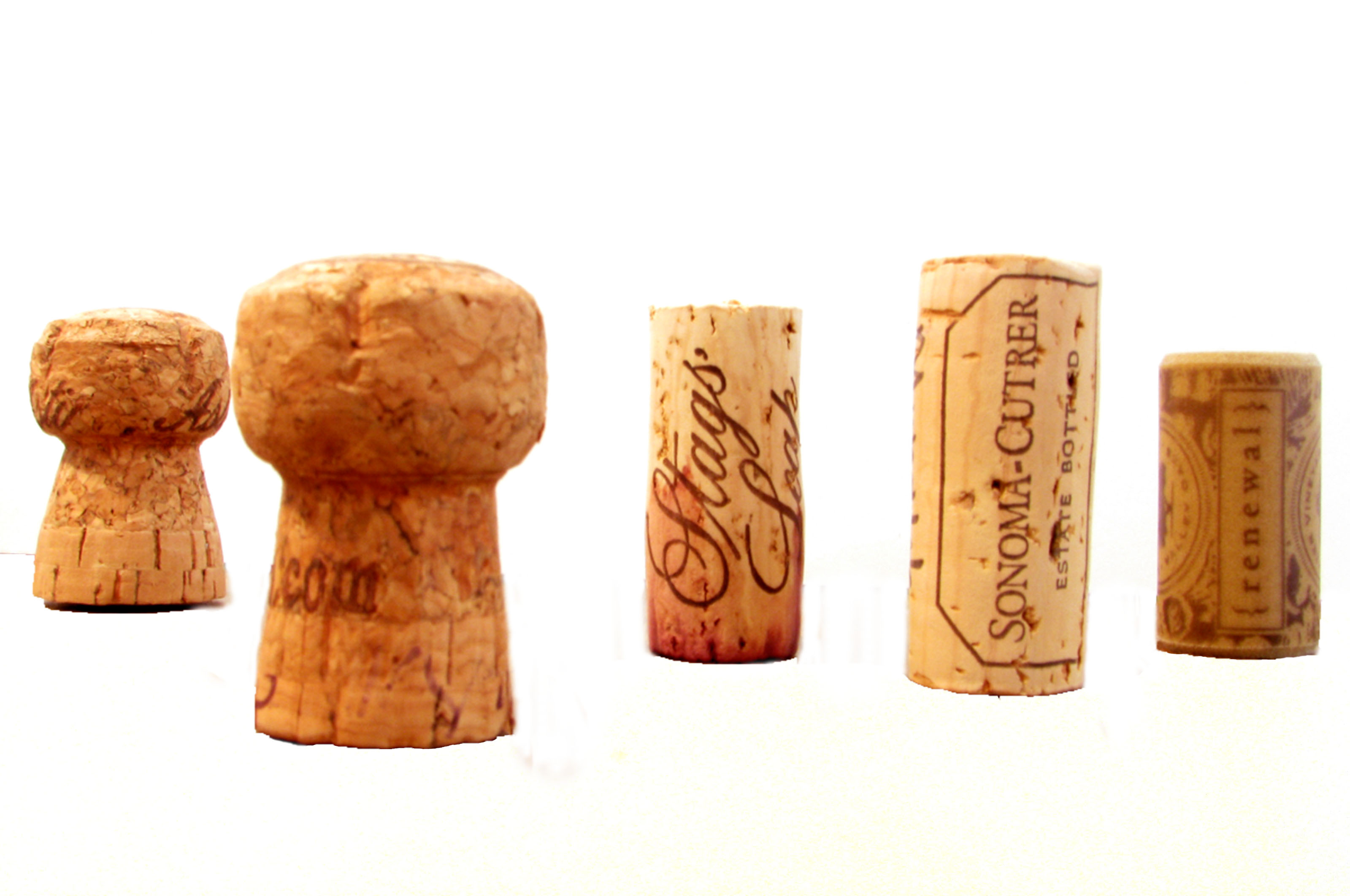
An assortment of wine corks

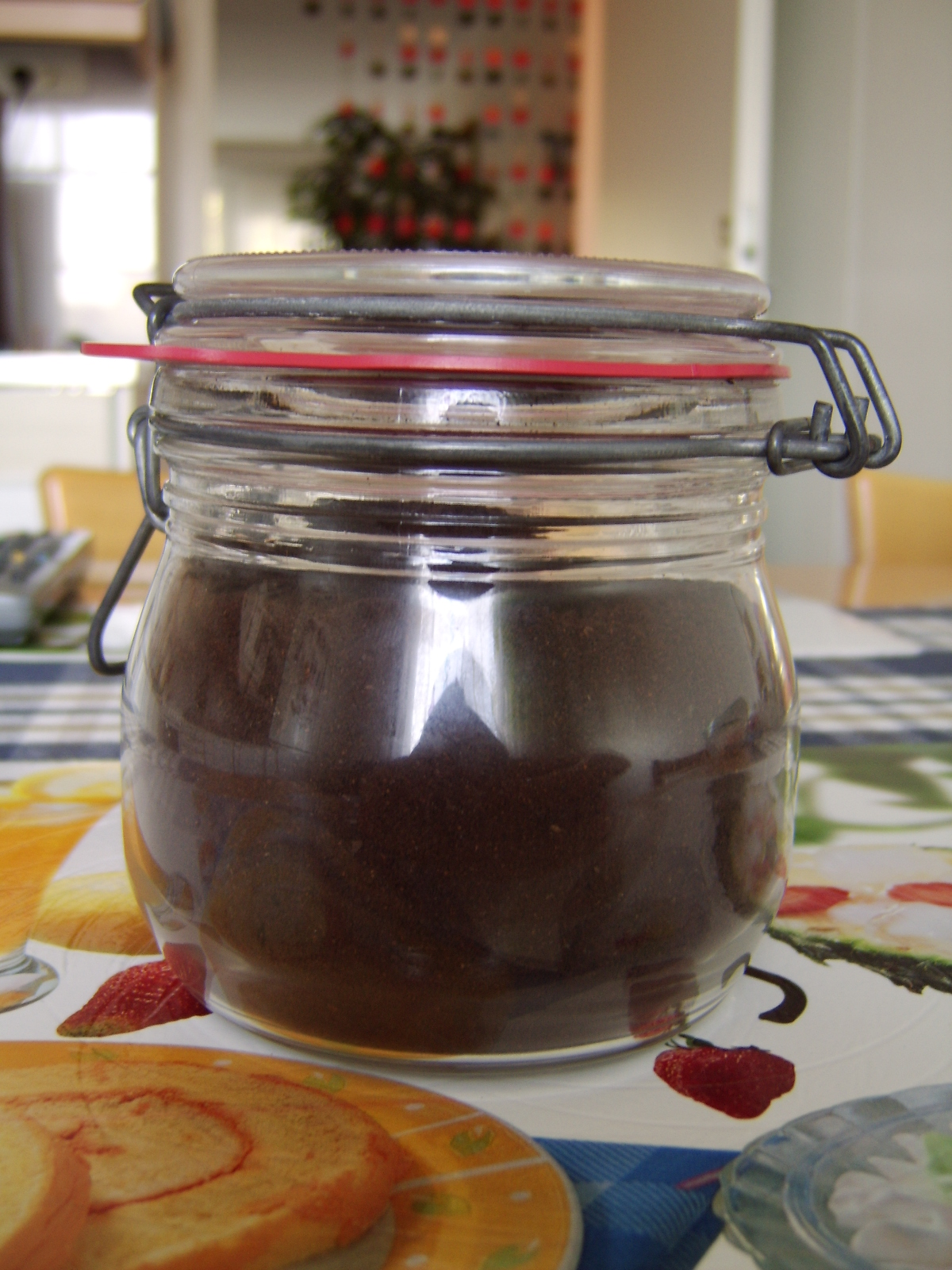
bail closure on jam jar

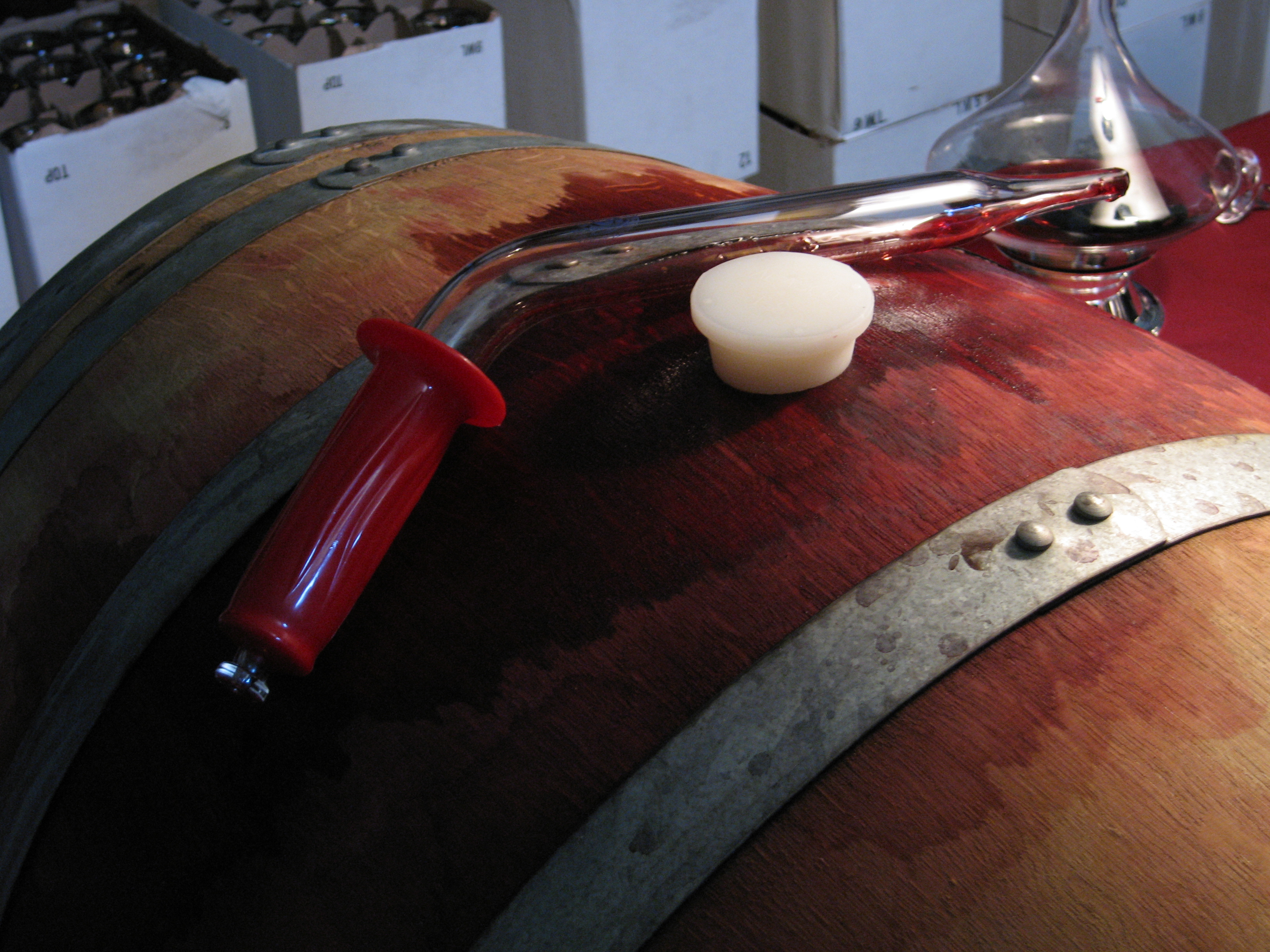
bung in bunghole of a wine barrel

== The manufacture of closures ==
The International Society of Beverage Technologists (ISBT) is the main trade association for closure manufacturers. It develops voluntary industry standards for its members to use in the manufacture of closures.

== See also ==
- Bottle cap
- Crown cork
- GPI container finish standards which includes closures for glass containers
- Hutchinson Patent Stopper
- Lid (container)
- Screw cap
- Stopper (plug)
- Tab (beverage can)
- Tamper resistant
- Tamper-evident
