= Tub (container) =

Type of large bowl typically for washing or packaging

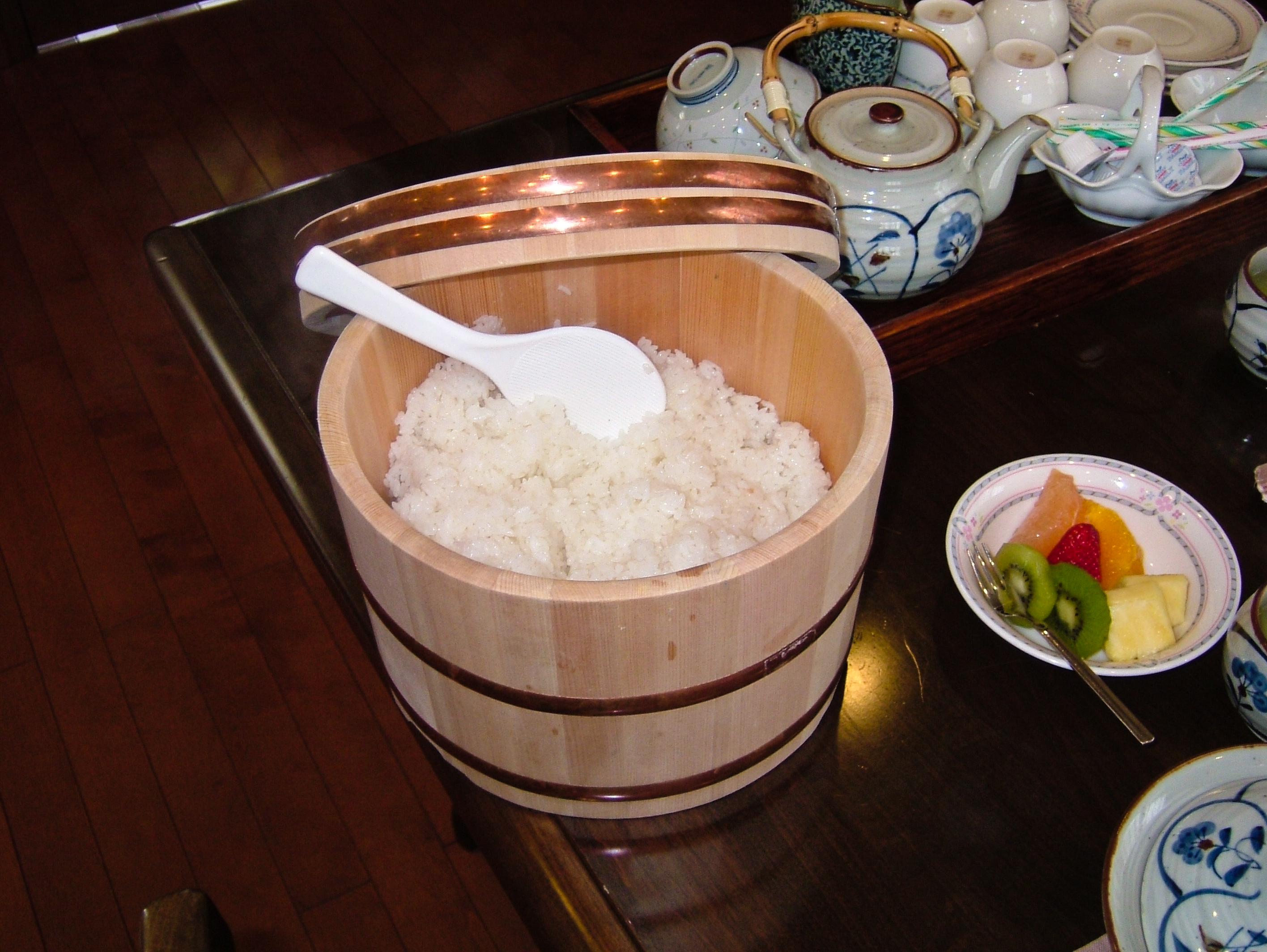
Rice in a wooden tub

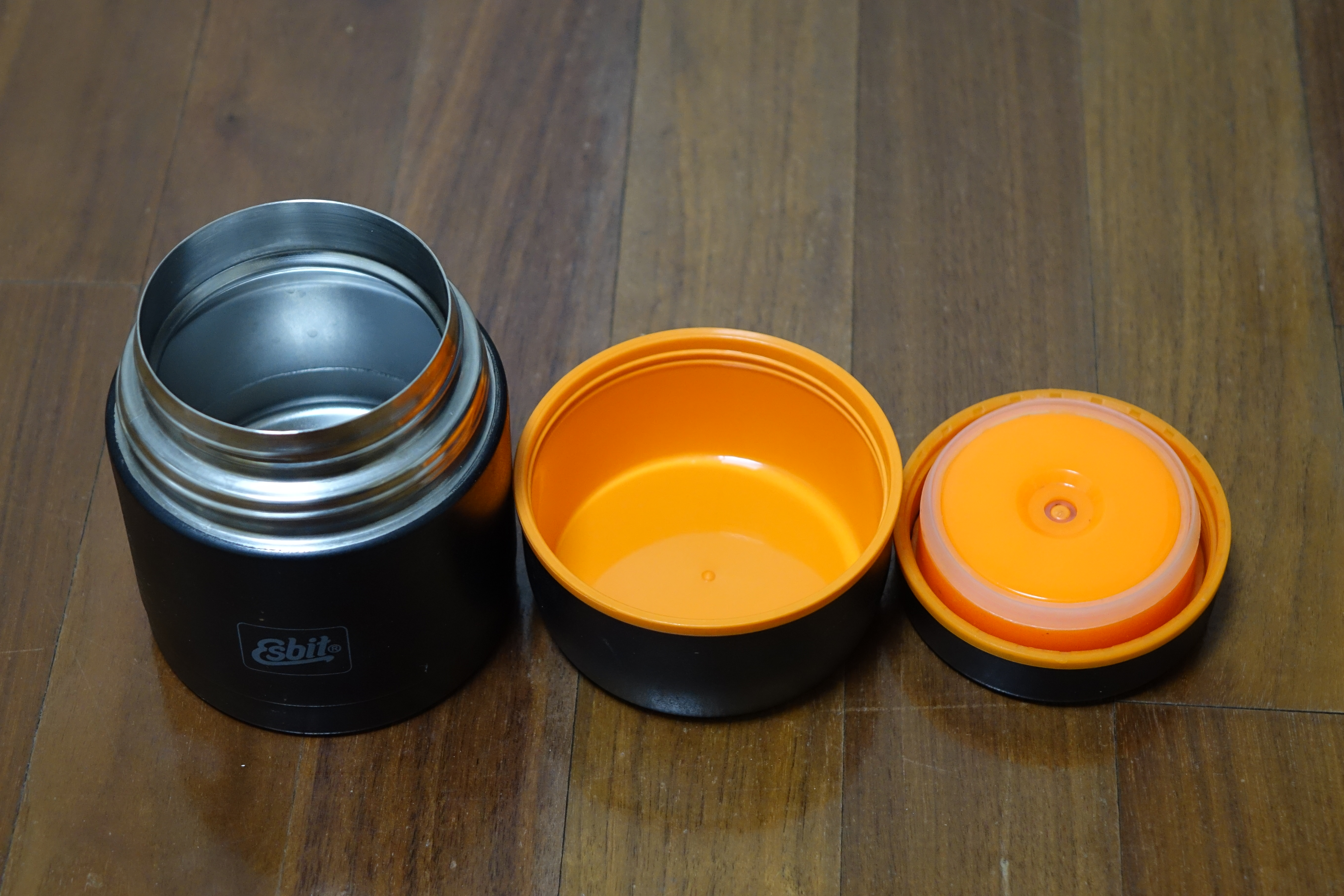
Korean dosirak can be a tub-shaped thermos, that can be used as a lunchbox

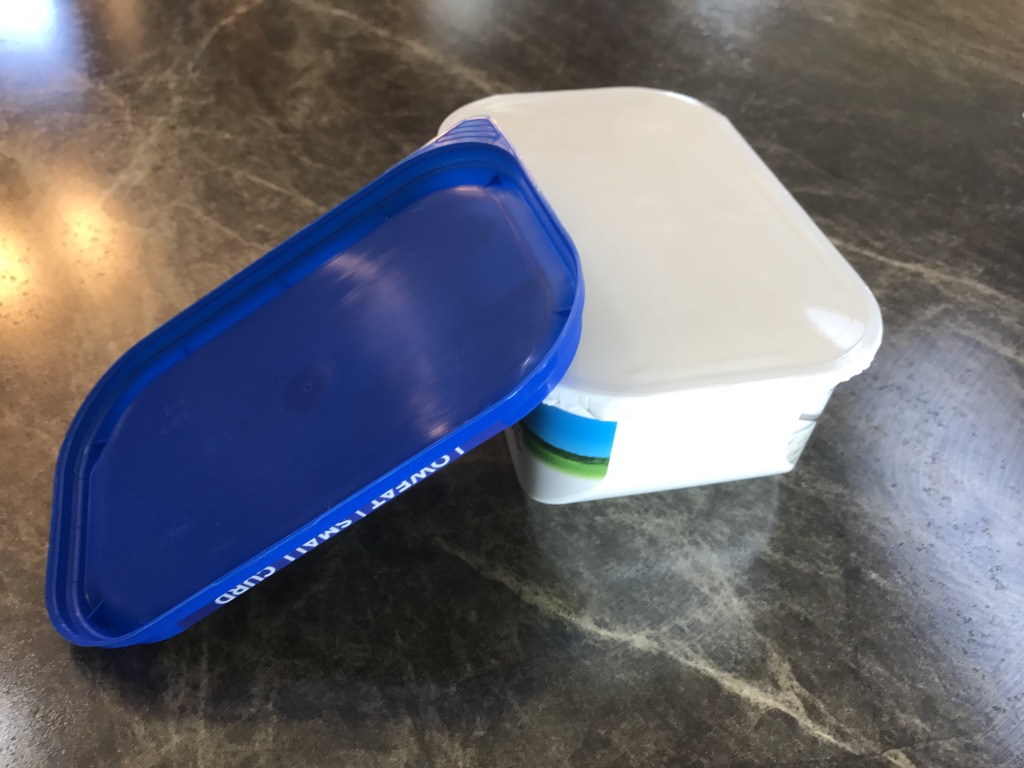
Tub of cottage cheese, lid, and lidding film

A tub is an open-top circular or oblong container. In earlier times they were made from wooden staves held together with iron hoops and were made by coopers. Modern tubs used in industry might be made from concrete, metal or plastic.

Small plastic tubs used in the home may have a separate or attached snap-on lid or cover; some tubs may have latched lids.

Tubs are used for multiple packaging applications as well as household and industrial storage.

== Construction ==
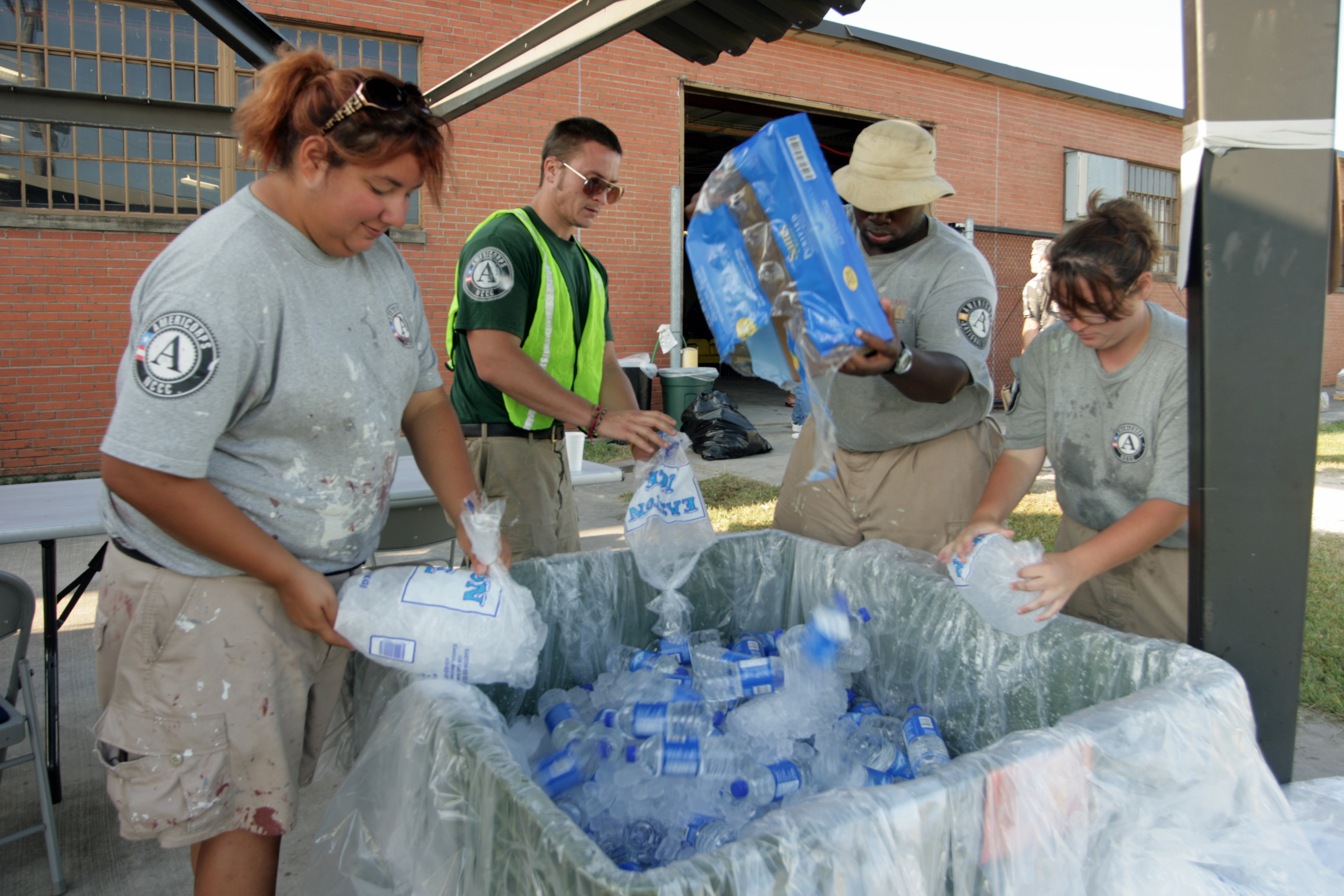
Large plastic tub being used as an ice chest

Many tubs are made of formed thermoplastics such as PET polyester, polystyrene, or polypropylene. Processes of creating tubs are either thermoforming or injection moulding. Tubs can also be formed of paperboard, molded pulp, and aluminum.

Some tubs have special microwave features such as susceptors

Tubs can have a heat sealed lidding film attached prior to the lid being placed on. Some tubs have a Tamper-evident band or security strip to indicate premature opening.

Several types of latches and means of lid attachment are available.

Both the body and lid of a tub can be printed or have attached labels.

== See also ==
- Cooper (profession)
- Tupperware
- Bath tub
