= Closure & Container Manufacturers Association =

Defunct American trade association for the plastic container industry

- Abbreviation: CCMA
- Successor: International Society of Beverage Technologists
- Formation: 1985; 41 years ago
- Dissolved: April 1, 2013; 13 years ago
- Type: Trade association
- Legal status: Association
- Purpose: Represent and support plastic container manufacturers
- Location: Barrington, IL, United States
- Region served: United States
- Services: Networking, information sharing, technical developments and industry advocacy
- Members: 10
- Chairman: Jack Hoscheit
- Funding: Members fees
- Website: www.closureandcontainer.org
- Formerly called: Closures Manufacturers Association

Closure & Container Manufacturers Association (CCMA) was an American trade association for manufacturers who produced closures and containers. Only manufacturers of plastic containers were represented in the association.

In 2013, the association was merged to became part of the International Society of Beverage Technologists.

== History ==
The CCMA was created in 1985 to promote voluntary industry technical standard, and to act as the industry's liaison with government, academia, and other allied trade associations.

In 2011, the association launched a Sustainability Initiative to improved recycling stream for caps and closures.

In 2013, The Closure and Container Manufacturers Association became part of the International Society of Beverage Technologists (ISBT) when the CCMA board decided that the time is right to tap into the resources of a larger organization with which they already share several common interests and initiatives.

== Activities ==
The CCMA has two major committees:

Closure Manufacturers Committee which (a) promoted efficiency in the closure industry; (b) developed voluntary standard drawings for closures; (c) made available to members technical data about closures; (d) liaised with other closure manufacturer trade organizations worldwide to attempt to create voluntary worldwide standards for closures; (e) worked with the National Institute of Standards and Technology to create industry standards compatible with legal requirements; and (f) worked with the Consumer Product Safety Commission to promote childproof closures to prevent accidental poisoning.

Plastic Container Manufacturers Committee which (a) developed voluntary standards for containers; (b) made available to members technical data about containers; and (c) liaised with other container manufacturer trade organizations worldwide to attempt to create voluntary worldwide standards for containers.
