= Stopper (plug) =

Conical closure used to seal a container

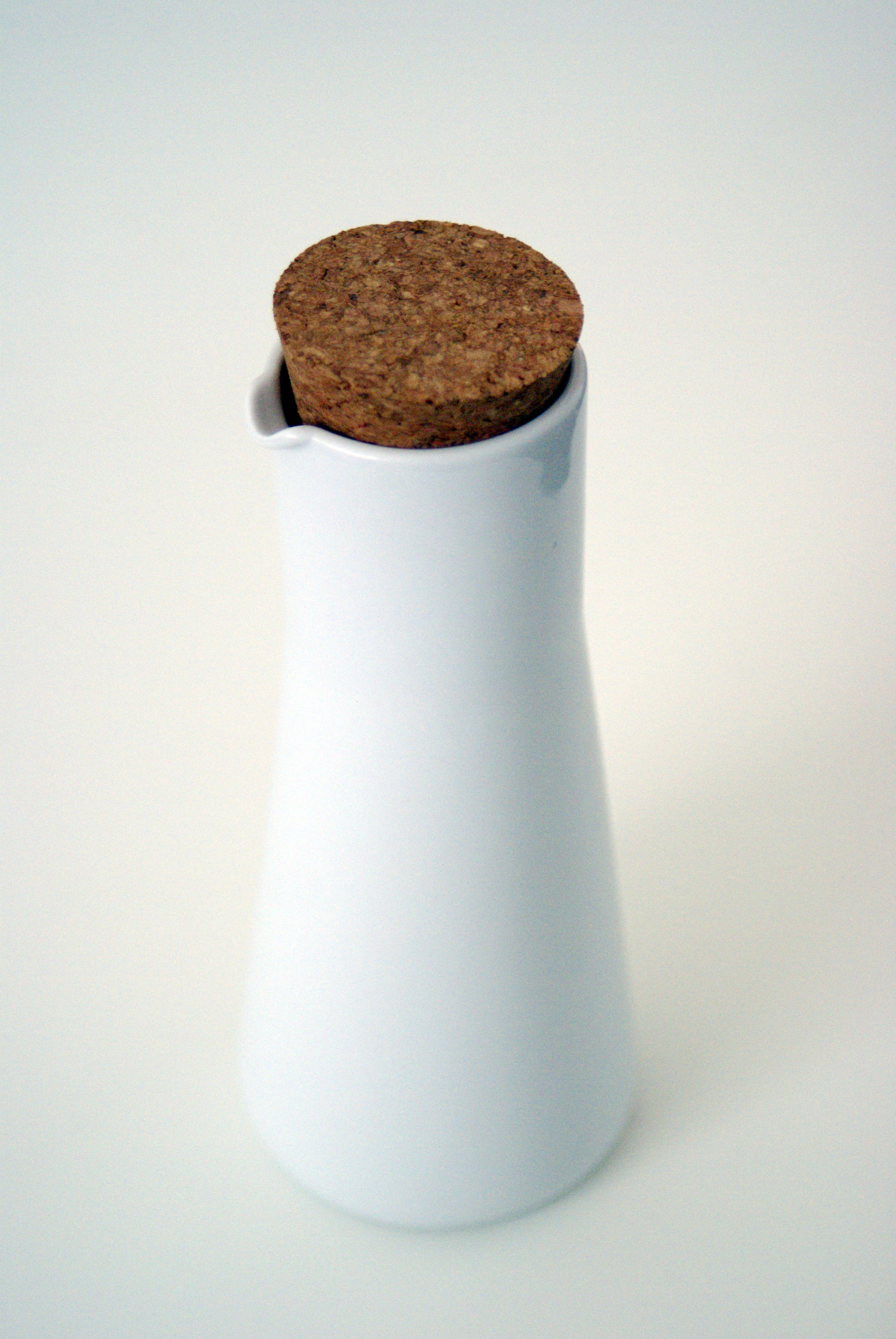
A jug with a cork stopper

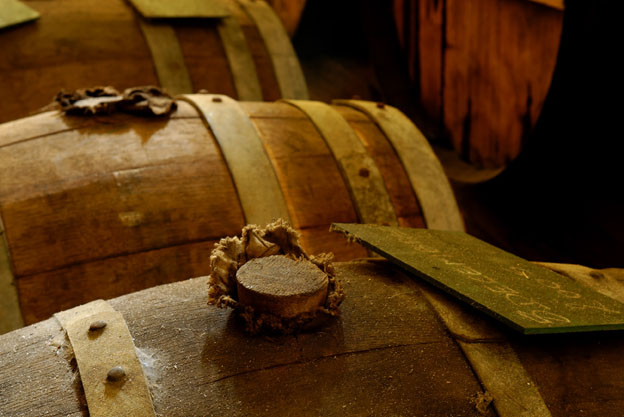
Bung in the bunghole of a wine barrel

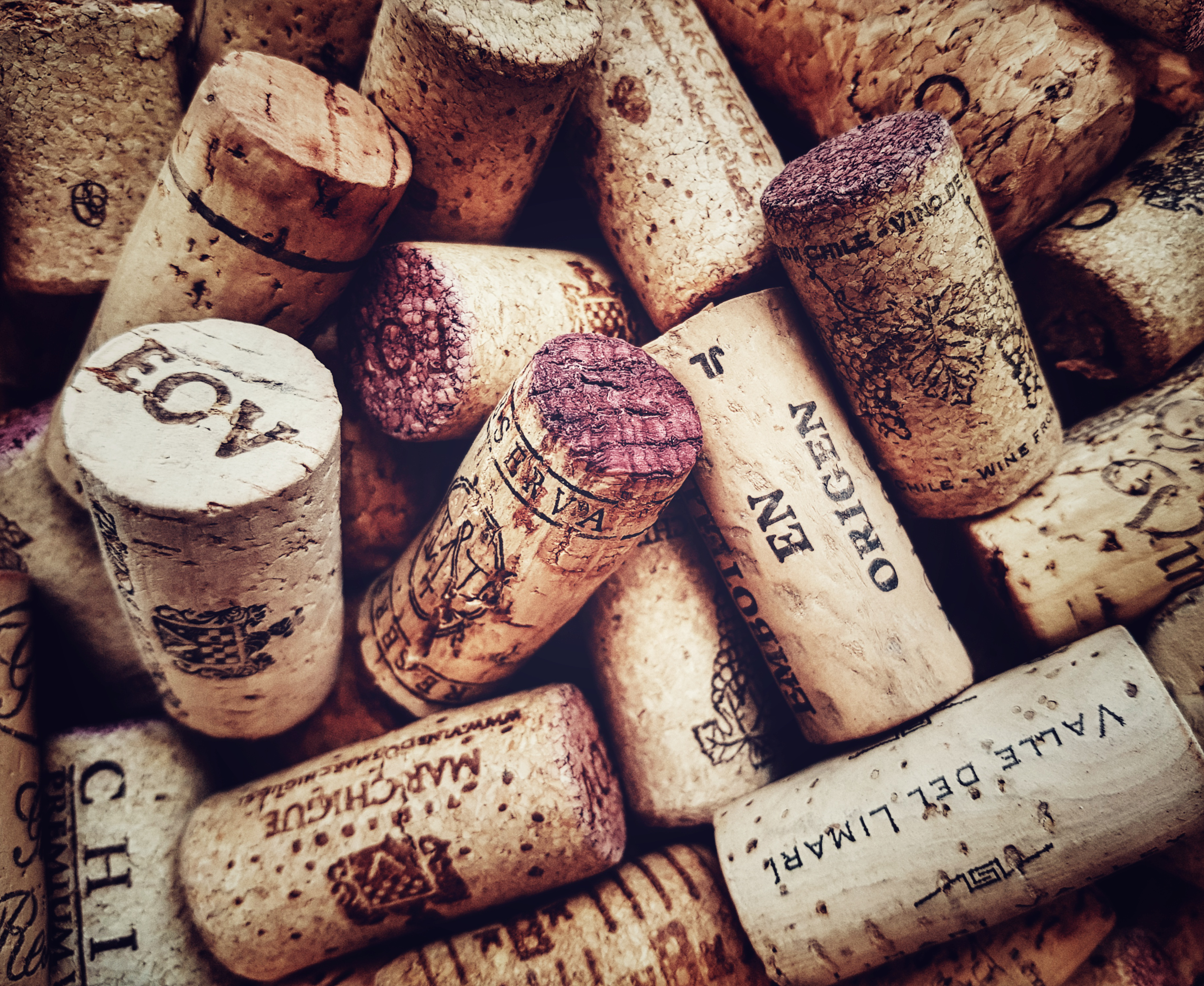
Cork stoppers from wine bottles

A stopper, bung, or cork is a cylindrical or conical closure used to seal a container, such as a bottle, tube, or barrel.

== Description ==
Unlike a lid or bottle cap, which encloses a container from the outside without displacing the inner volume, a bung is partially or wholly inserted inside the container to act as a seal. A bung can be defined as "a plug or closure used to close an opening in a drum or barrel. It is called a plug when referring to a steel drum closure."

A glass stopper is often called a "ground glass joint" (or "joint taper"), and a cork stopper is called simply a "cork". Stoppers used for wine bottles are referred to as "corks", even when made from another material.

A common every-day example of a stopper is the cork of a wine bottle. When used to seal the bungholes of barrels, the stopper is called a bung. Other bungs, particularly those used in chemical barrels, may be made of metal and be screwed into place via threading.

== Ground glass joint ==
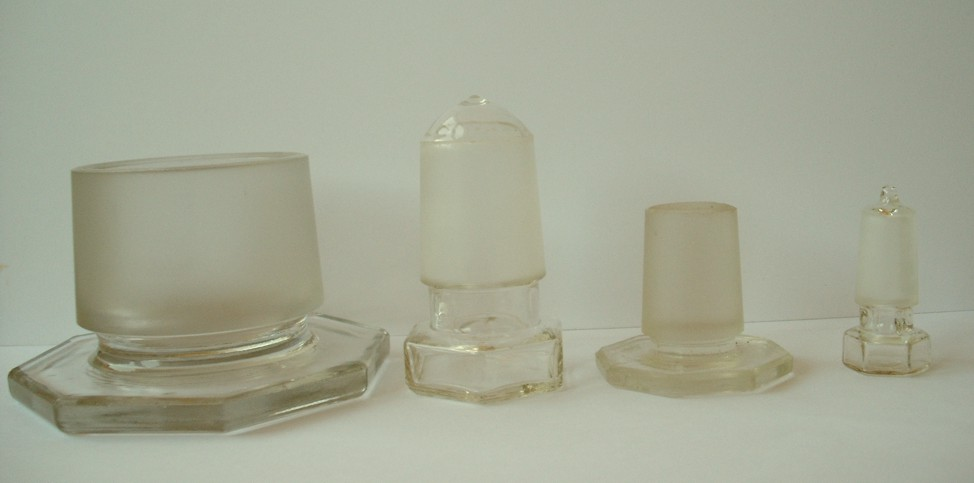
Ground glass stoppers

Ground glass joint (or ground glass stoppers) are commonly used with laboratory glassware, mainly because of their nonreactivity. Some stoppers used in labs have holes in them to allow the insertion of glass or rubber tubing. This is often used when a reaction is taking place in the flask or test tube and the byproduct or result of the reaction is desired to be collected. For instance, if one were to boil water in a test tube and wanted to collect the water vapor, one could seal the test tube with a stopper with holes in it. With tubing inserted into the hole(s), when the tube is heated, water vapor will rise through the hole, make its way through the tubing, and into the collection chamber of choice. The water vapor would not be able to escape into the air, because the stopper and the tubing, if set up correctly, would be airtight.

== Rubber bungs ==
In chemistry, bungs made of hardened rubber are frequently used in small-scale experimental set-ups involving non-corrosive gases. Some chemistry bungs may also include one or more holes so a glass tube or laboratory funnel may be inserted through the bung and into the container or another piece of apparatus. The rubber bung may be used to seal a flask because the user may require the contents to be mixed via shaking the flask or may require that the contents be kept inside the flask and prevented from leaking out. In all cases, the bung keeps the experimentation environment sealed so that liquids or gases cannot escape (or enter).

For applications that place higher demands on the bung in terms of temperature and mechanical stability or solvent resistance, standardized glass stoppers and connectors are preferred.

Bottle stoppers made from gutta-percha, a natural rubber that is both chemically resistant and thermoplastic, were the first product of the Gutta Percha Company, better known for making submarine telegraph cables.

== See also ==
- Flip-top
- Bunghole
- Cork borer
- Closure (container)
- Hutchinson Patent Stopper
- Ground glass joint
