= Tamper-evident band =

Security feature on tops of bottles

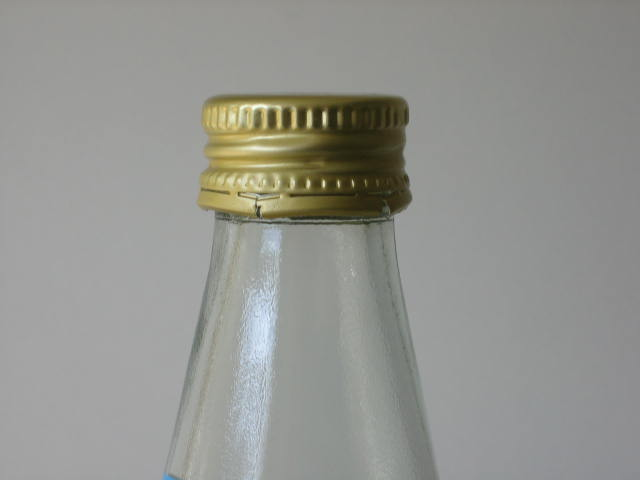
break-away band on aluminum cap

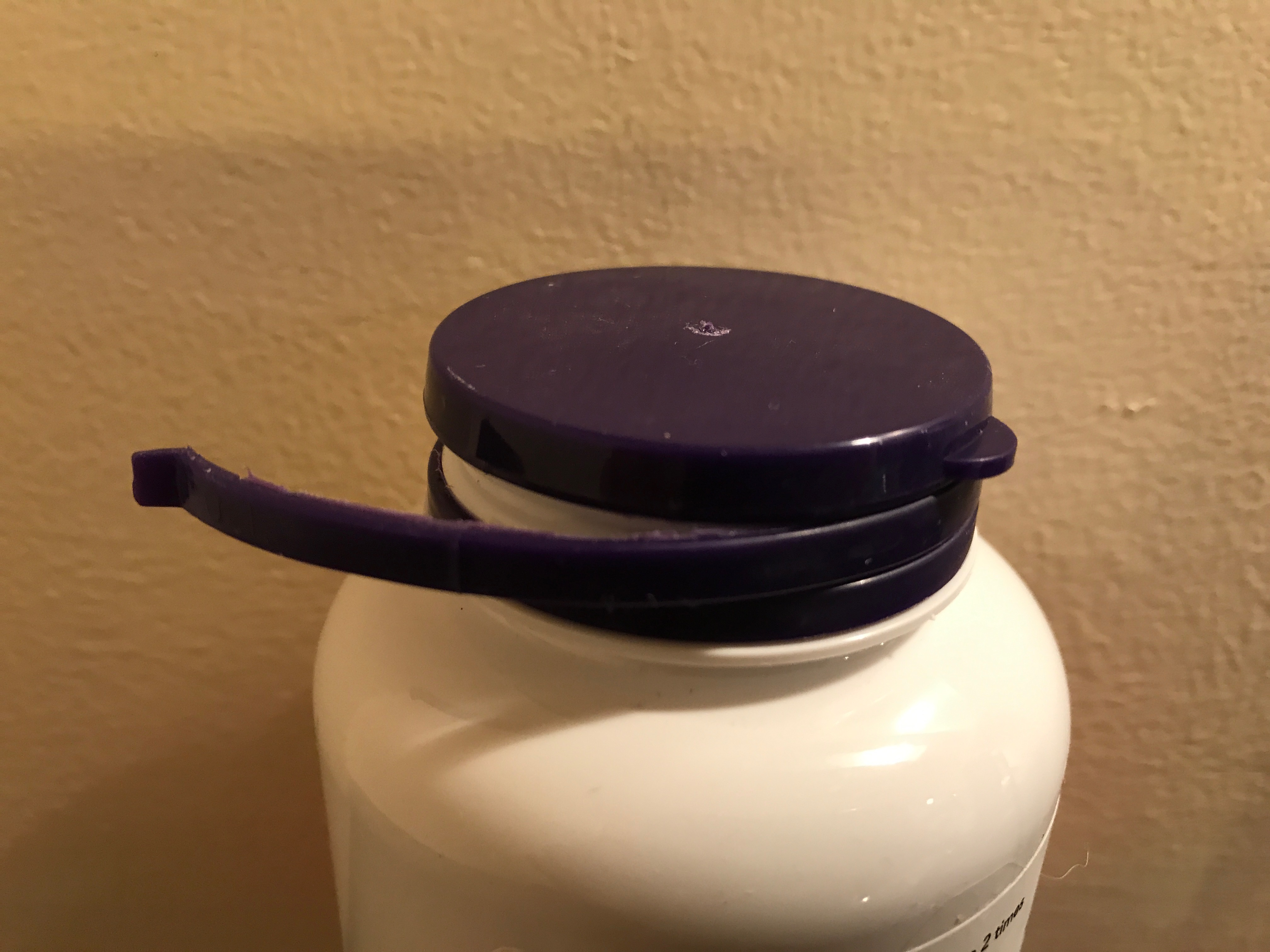
Removal of integral band allows hinged snap-cap to function

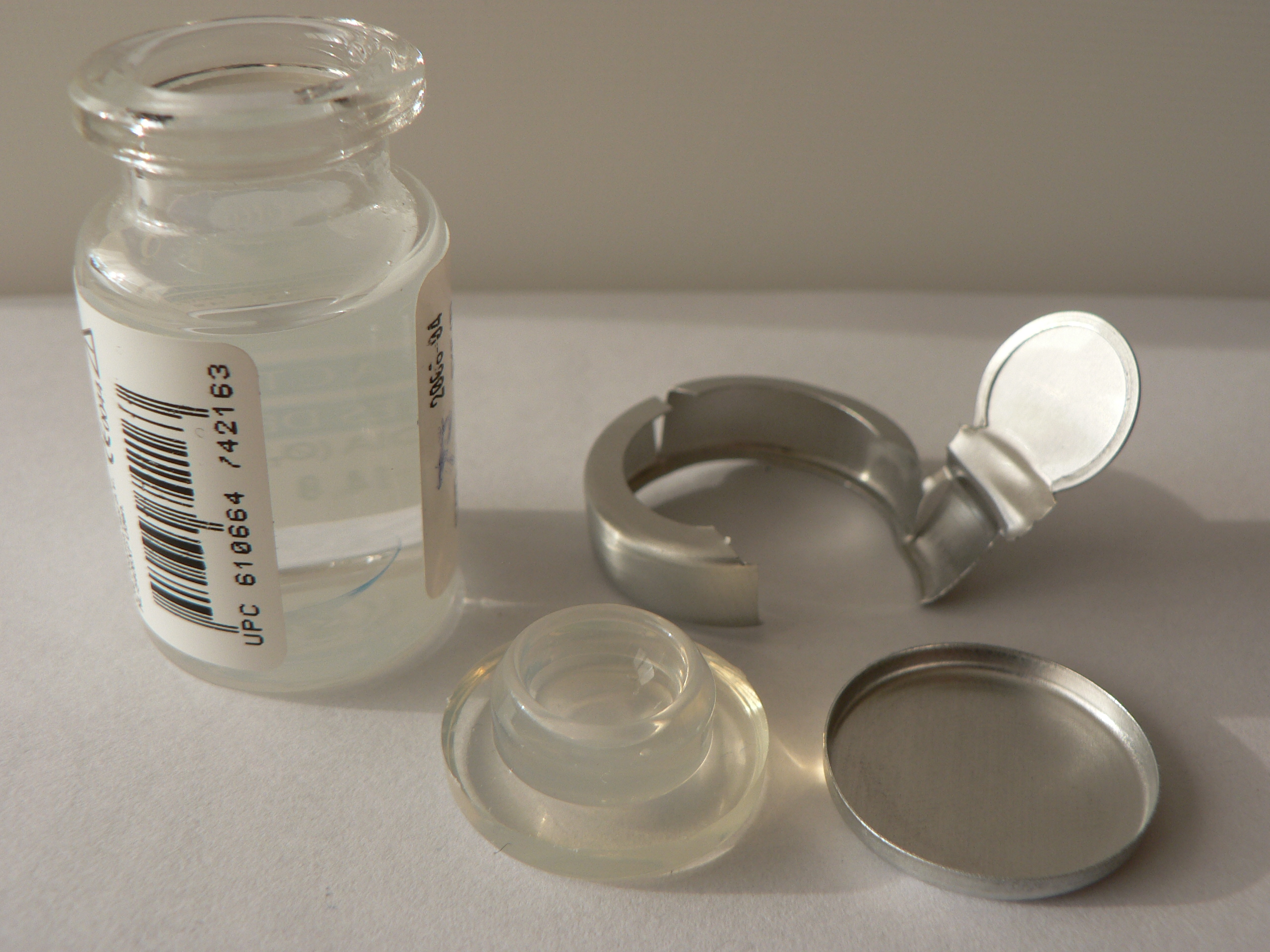
Tearable metal band on pharmaceutical bottle

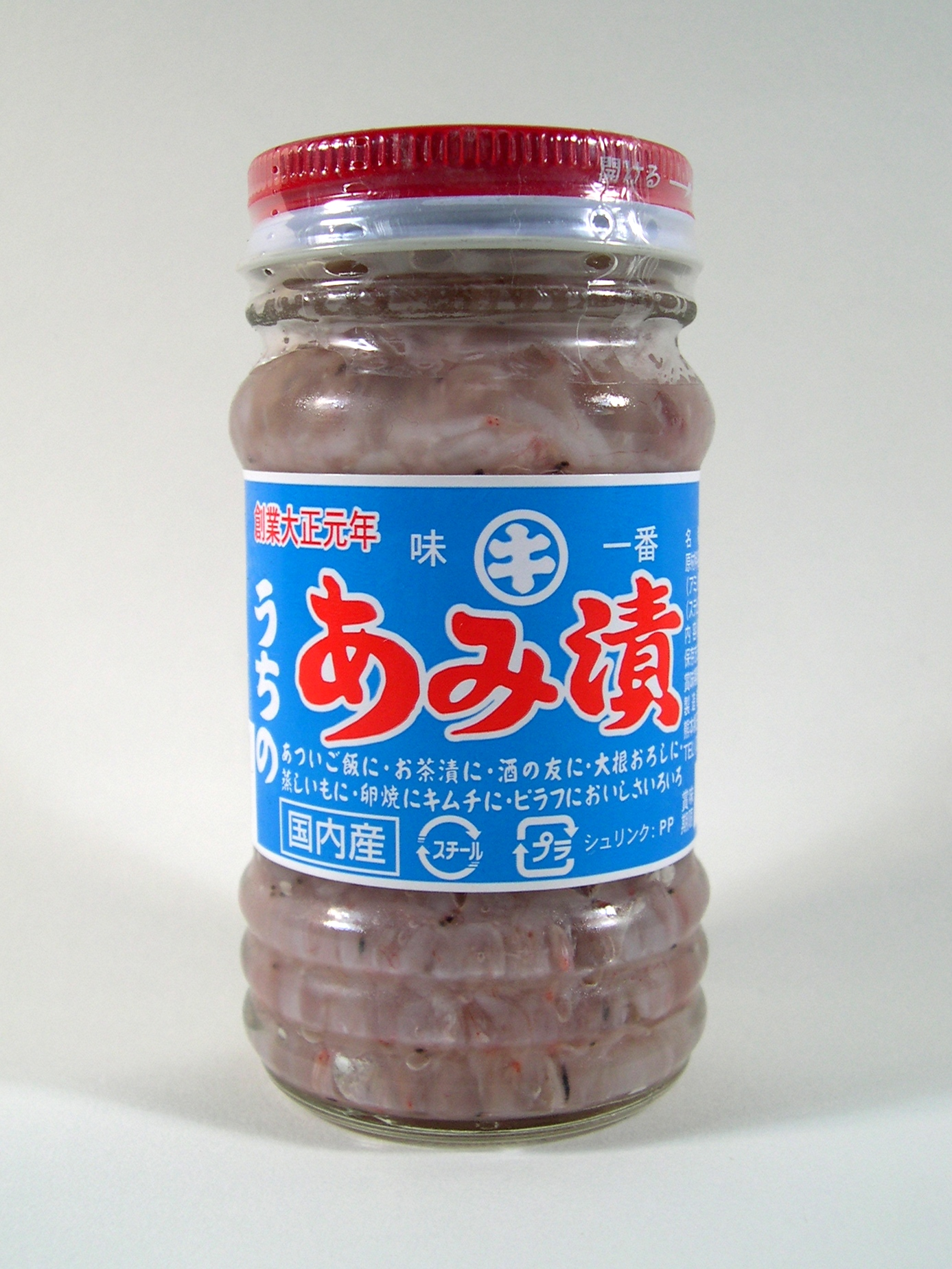
Shrink band for secondary seal on a bottle of Japanese shrimp

A tamper-evident band or security ring serves as a tamper resistant or tamper evident function to a screw cap, lid, or closure. The term tamper-proof is sometimes used but is considered a misnomer given that pilfering is still technically possible.

A security band can be integrated with the cap or can be a separate package component. It is a plastic or metal structure around the circumference (usually) of the closure that is often found attached below a closure in bottles, jars, and tubs.

Several variations have been developed for caps, lids, and closures. The use of custom printing and security printing is available. Perforations or other areas of weakness are often used to initiate and control a tear. Sometimes engineered frangibility is used for break-away functions.

While tamper-evident bands are not considered a challenge for recycling, it is important that the band stays attached to the cap in case of refillable bottles, because it is hard to remove the rings from intact bottles in an economical way.

The opening ring is a tamper warning: if the seal between the ring and the cap is broken, it is an indication that the cap has been opened.

== Purposes ==
Security opening rings might have several possible purposes:

- Provide clear evidence of container being opened
- Deter tampering
- Deter package pilferage
- Deter product adulteration
- Improved closure strength during shipping
- Regulatory requirement (sometimes)

== Roll-on metal closures ==
When an aluminum or plastic bottle cap has an integral band, it is usually connected by thin bridges. They can be molded along with the cap or slit afterwards. When unscrewing the cap, the frangible ring breaks: the ring can separate from the cap, and two separate pieces remain, the sealing piece and the leftover ring; or the broken ring can form a "pigtail" still attached to the cap.

== Shrink bands ==
Separate bands of shrink film can be placed over the closure and tightened in a shrink tunnel. Some have perforations or nicks to help initiate the tear.

== Other ==
Most standard pressure sensitive tapes do not have a high degree of tamper evidence. Some special security tapes have additional tamper evident features which offer better tamper evidence. Some have intentional weakness which cause breakage or delamination; others have hidden messages which appear upon opening.

== Examples ==
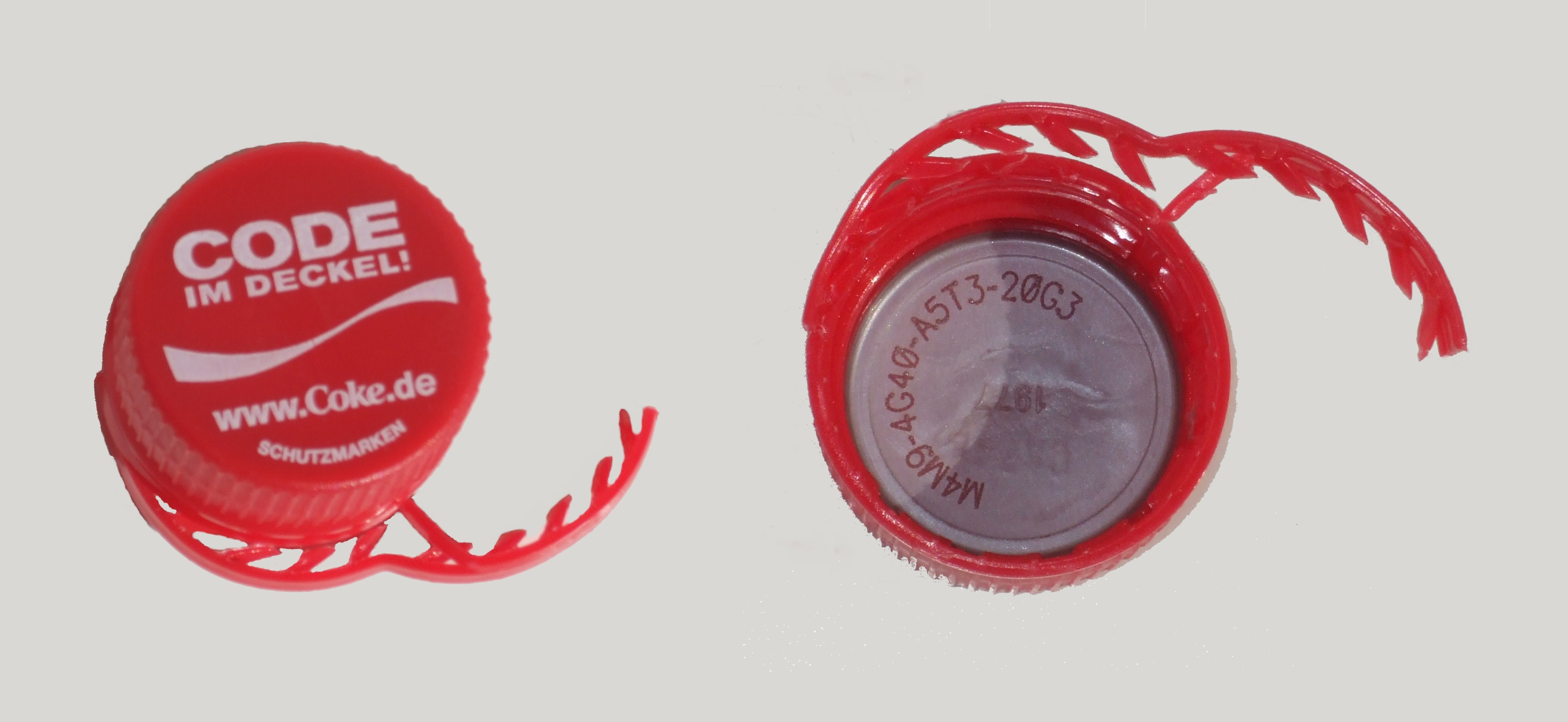
plastic screw cap with break-away band

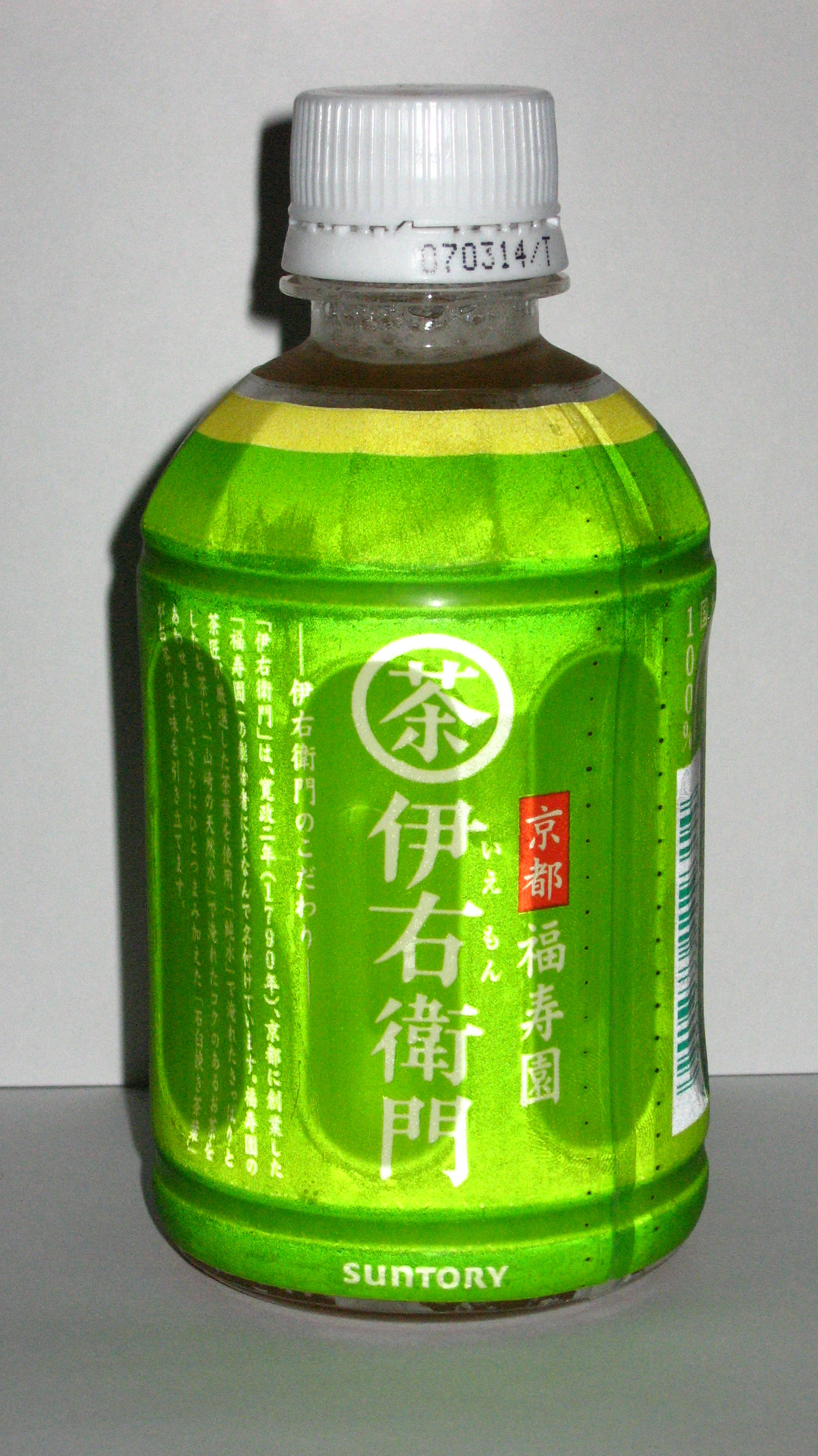
plastic screw cap with break-away band

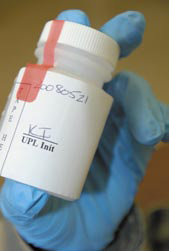
Cross strip of PSA security tape with frangible backing

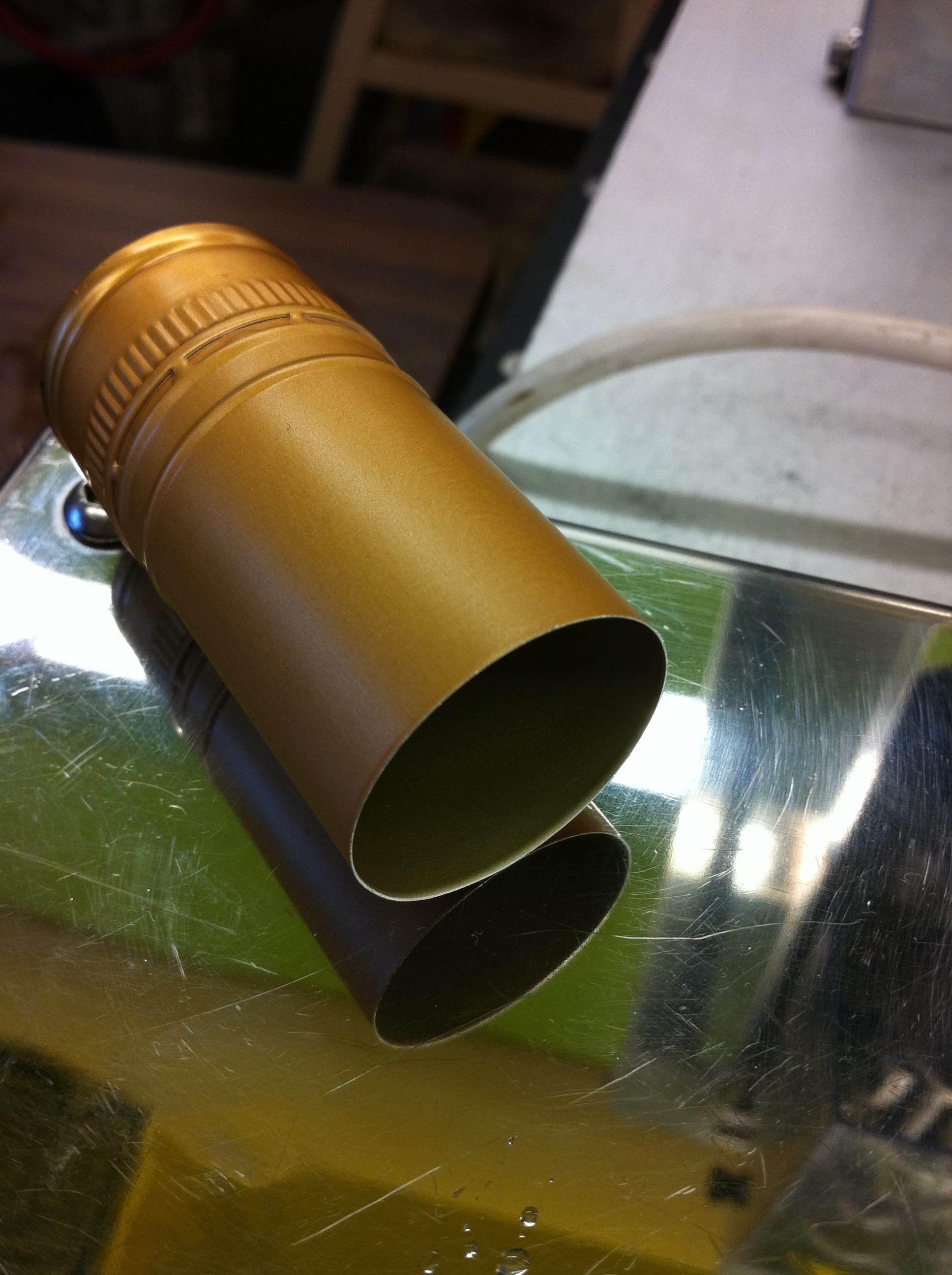
A capsule is fitted onto a wine bottle and heat shrunk tightly

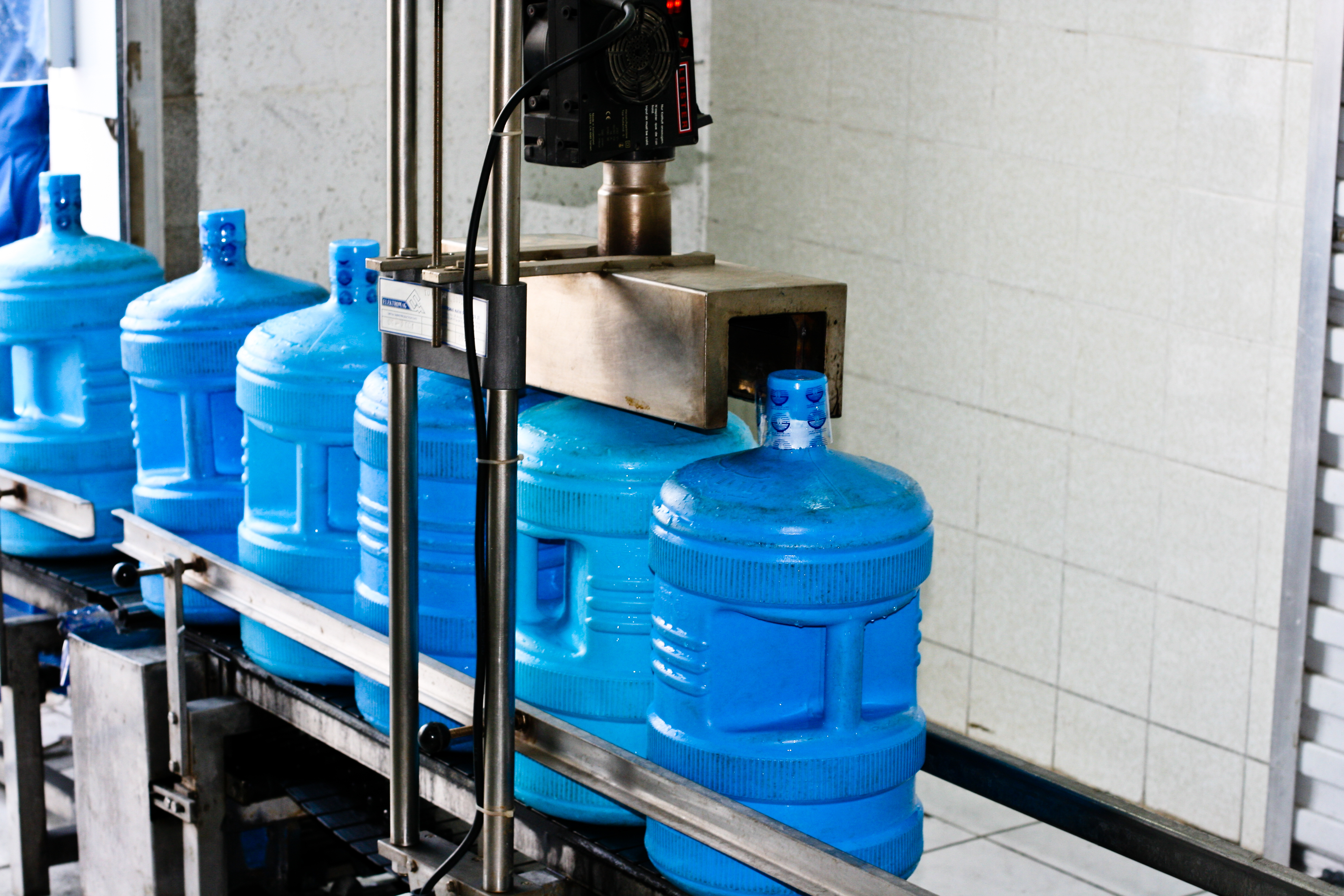
in-line heating of shrink bands on plastic bottles of water

== See also ==
- List of bottle types, brands and companies
- Tamper-evident technology
- Tamper resistance
- Chicago Tylenol murders
