= Lid =

Part of a container that closes or seals it by fitting over and around the opening

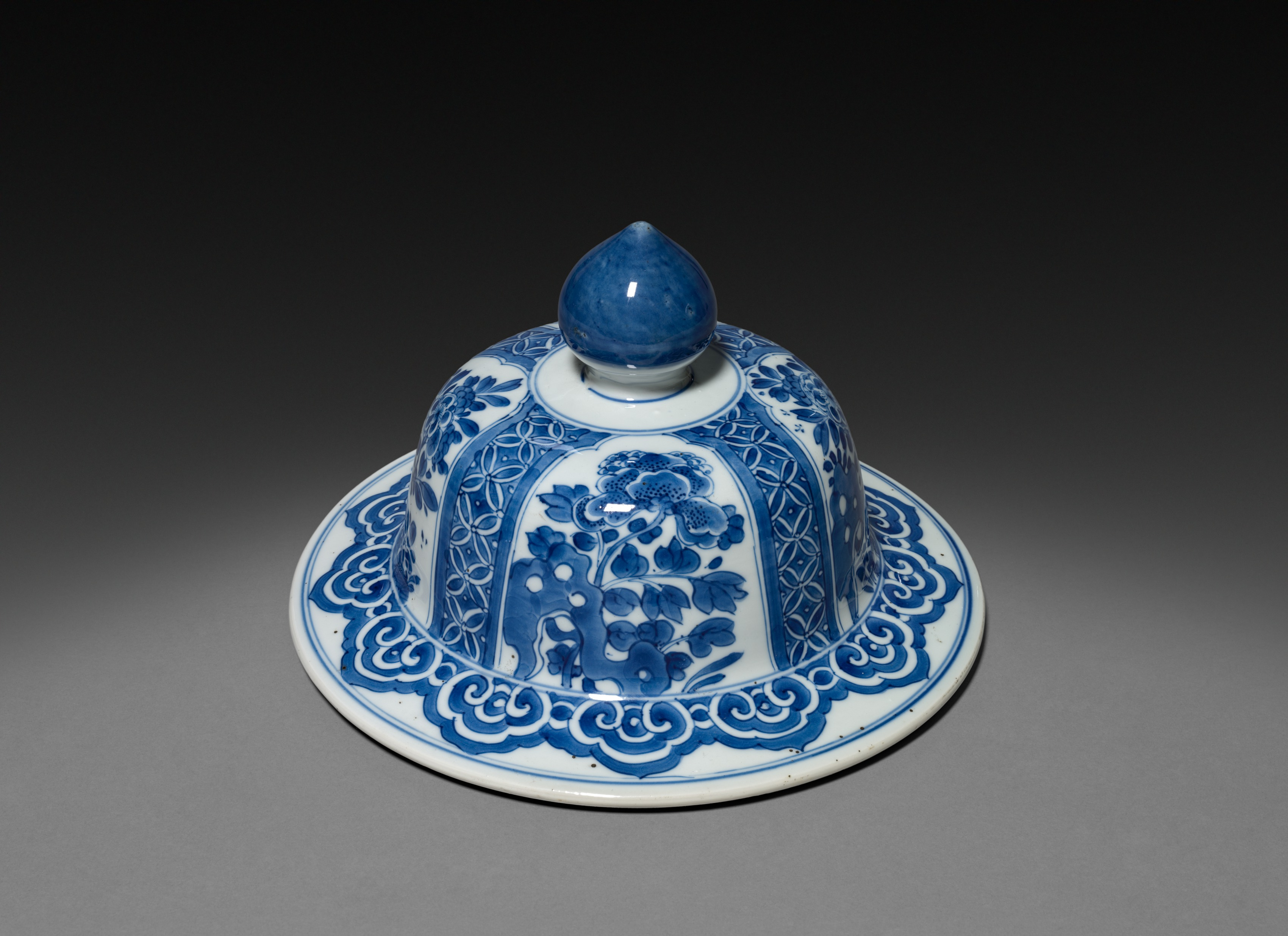
A decorative lid

A lid or cover is part of a container, and serves as the closure or seal, usually one that completely closes the object. Lids can be placed on small containers such as tubs as well as larger lids for open-head pails and drums.

== Etymology ==
The Old English term hlid is derived from the Proto-Germanic term *hlidan, meaning literally "that which bends over".

According to the Oxford English Dictionary, the earliest attested use of the word in English is by Ælfric of Eynsham in his Homilies (c. 1000). Other meanings of the term, now mostly obsolete or slang, include shutters, the top pie crust, the kneecap, a hat or cap (from which the phrase "flipped his lid" is derived, or the act of concealment or silencing (as in "keeping the lid on the secret"). It is also used metaphorically in the saying "there's a lid for every pot", meaning that for each person there exists an ideal partner.

== History ==
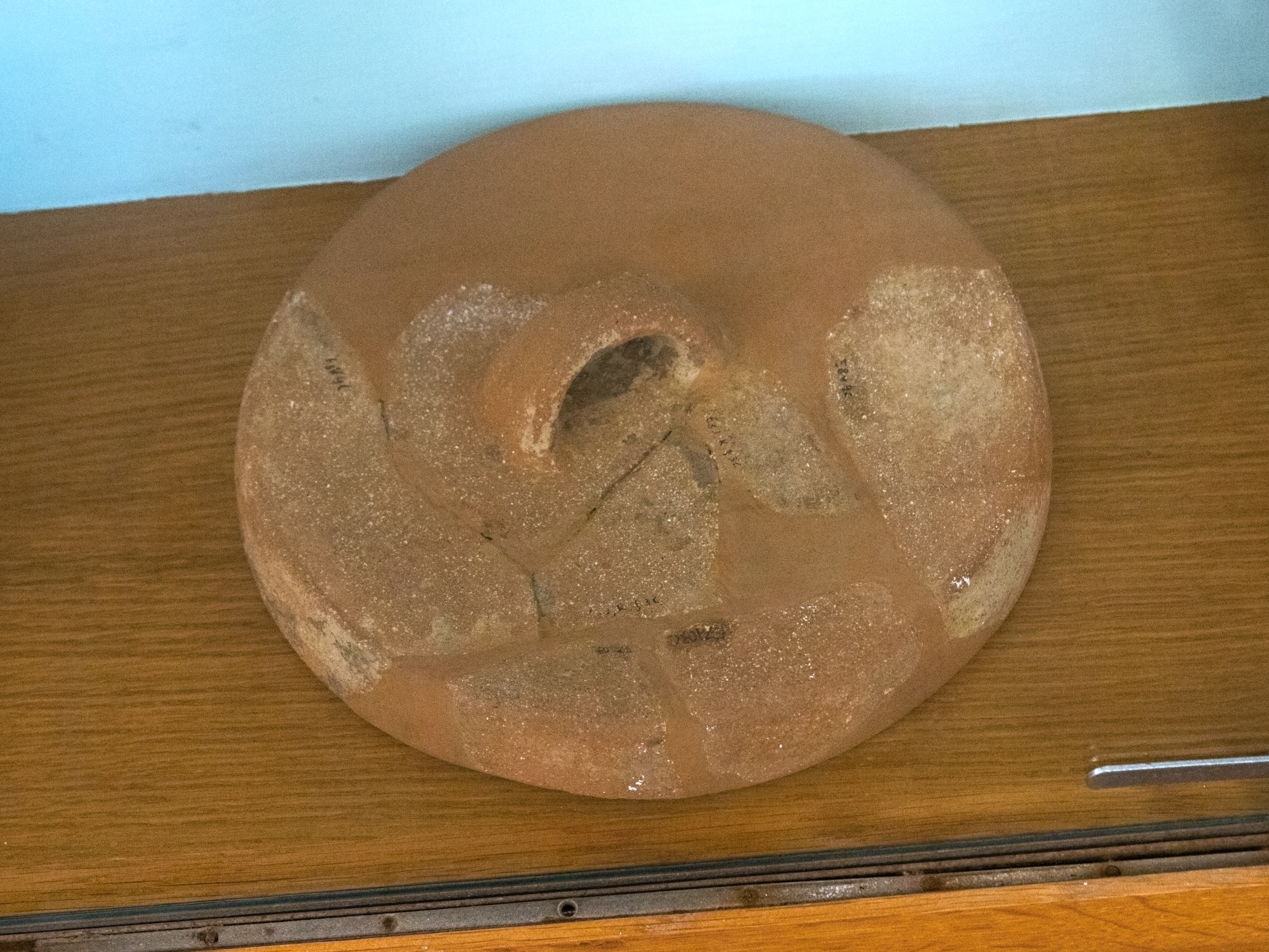
Pottery lid from the late Neolithic period, 4300–3200 BC

Ancient vessels with lids have been discovered dating to as early as 4000–3500 BC, and a lid alone dating to 6500–4000 BC has been recovered. A study of cooking dishes in the Aegean region from the Neolithic to the Iron Age noted an absence of surviving lids, although there was some evidence to suggest lids may have been used. Egyptologist Julia Budka has suggested that early pots may have used lids made from organic materials that did not survive, or that early lids may have been misinterpreted as dishes.

Ancient Egyptian canopic jars with lids date as far back as 2532 BC. Jar burials were also used in southeast Europe, with a lidded jar being recovered from an early Neolithic site.

The use of lidded vessels for fermentation had emerged by 1000 BC, with sealed beverage vessels being recovered from ancient Chinese archaeological sites. Italian cooking pans with lids dating to 100 BC have been recovered at Tel Anafa in Israel, suggesting the trade of such items.

Tankards with hinged lids of silver or pewter were a common design in northern Europe by the 1700s. Beginning in the 1840s, printing technology was used to embellish the lids of commercial products. F&R Pratt of Fenton Staffordshire became a major producer of colour-transferred pot lids, of which over 550 designs are attested; some were on display at the Great Exhibition of 1851. By the 1880s in Britain black-and-white underglaze transfer-printed moulded pottery lids were being made in quantity to advertise their use for fish paste suppliers, cosmetics like hair grease, and chemists manufacturing toothpaste and creams. Specialist auctions of pot lids began in 1924 and peaked in the 1970s, although they continue to be of interest to collectors.

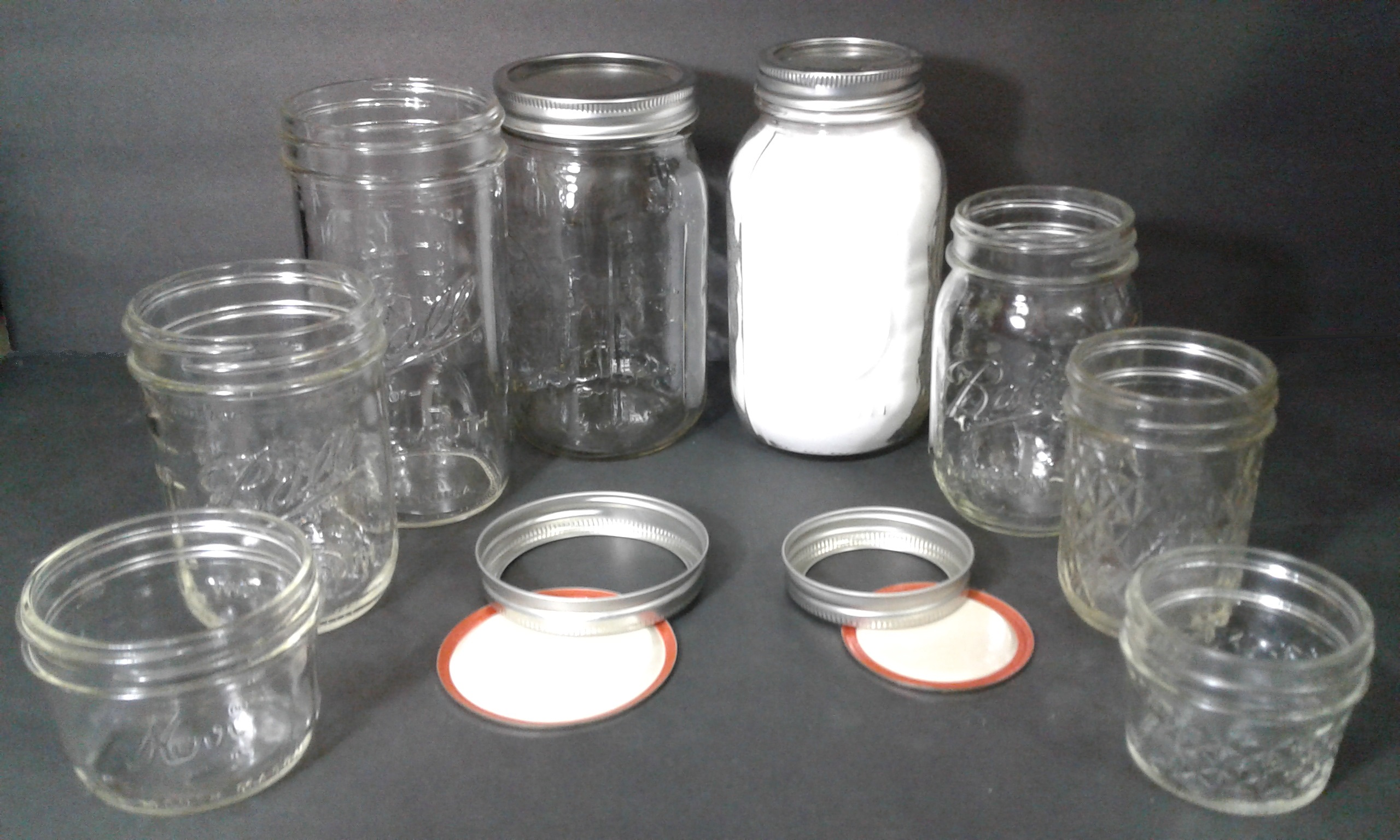
Modern Mason jars showing the screw band design

The use of glass or tin lids sealed to jars with wax emerged in Europe by 1814 and was popularized by the 1840s for people engaged in home canning. The screw-on Mason jar lid was patented in 1858 and was considered superior to previous fruit jar closure techniques, particularly after the addition of a lid liner in 1869 to prevent the metal lid from impacting the taste of the product. That lid was largely replaced by a tin band design as a result of metal shortages during World War II, although variations on this design existed from the 1860s. Lids with a lightning toggle were also used for fruit jars from 1882; alternative designs from the 1860s used a thumbscrew or lever closure. A version using a spring clip became popular during the early 20th century, but was overtaken by the screw band design in the 1930s. A revival in interest in home canning during the COVID-19 pandemic led to a shortage of Mason jar lids.

The precursor to the lid safety button, a mechanism to ensure a jar is sealed, was patented in 1936. When baby food began to be sold in glass jars in the 1960s, consumer concerns led to the safety button design being incorporated into marketing of these products. The Continental White Cap company, which specialized in lid design and production, pursued a lid-testing process in the 1990s and filed multiple patents for tamper-evident closures following the Heinz extortion campaign, resulting in the modern safety button design. In 1945, Earl Tupper patented a design for a watertight and airtight lid made of plastic. This design became the basis for Tupperware.

There was a significant increase in patents filed for "drink-through hot beverage lids" in the 1980s. The increased popularity of lattes and similar drinks in the 2000s resulted in the development of elevated lids to accommodate microfoam. As of 2009 the coffee lid market is valued at roughly $180 million. An estimated 14 billion lids were sold in 2009 in the United States.

== Design ==
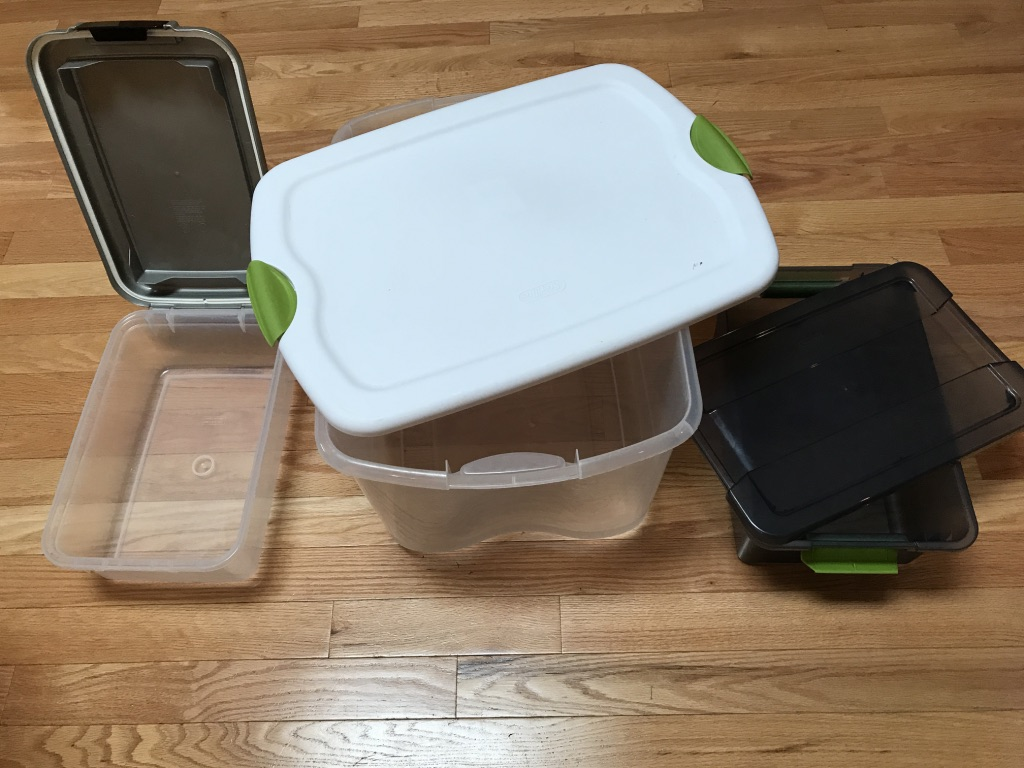
Home storage containers with latched lids

Lids can be made of varying materials, and may or may not match the material of their associated container; for example, some modern glass reusable food containers are sold with plastic lids. Some lids have latches and/or rubber gaskets to improve the security of their fit. Others have anti-tampering mechanisms to hold the lid on securely until opening. Lids which have become unsealed or left uncovered may present a food safety risk.

Lids can be designed to sit flat against the rim of the associated vessel, to seal the rim, or to cover the rim from the outside. They may have handles to facilitate removal, particularly if intended for use with cooking vessels. Lids can be attached or detached; attached lids have been promoted as a means of addressing plastic pollution.

Some containers have a plastic film heat-sealed onto the container, often called a lidding film. These are often used in food production to improve longevity of the product and maintain food safety.

Certain lid designs present accessibility concerns, as older people or those with certain disabilities may lack the strength or dexterity to open tight lids or peel lidding films.

== Cultural significance ==
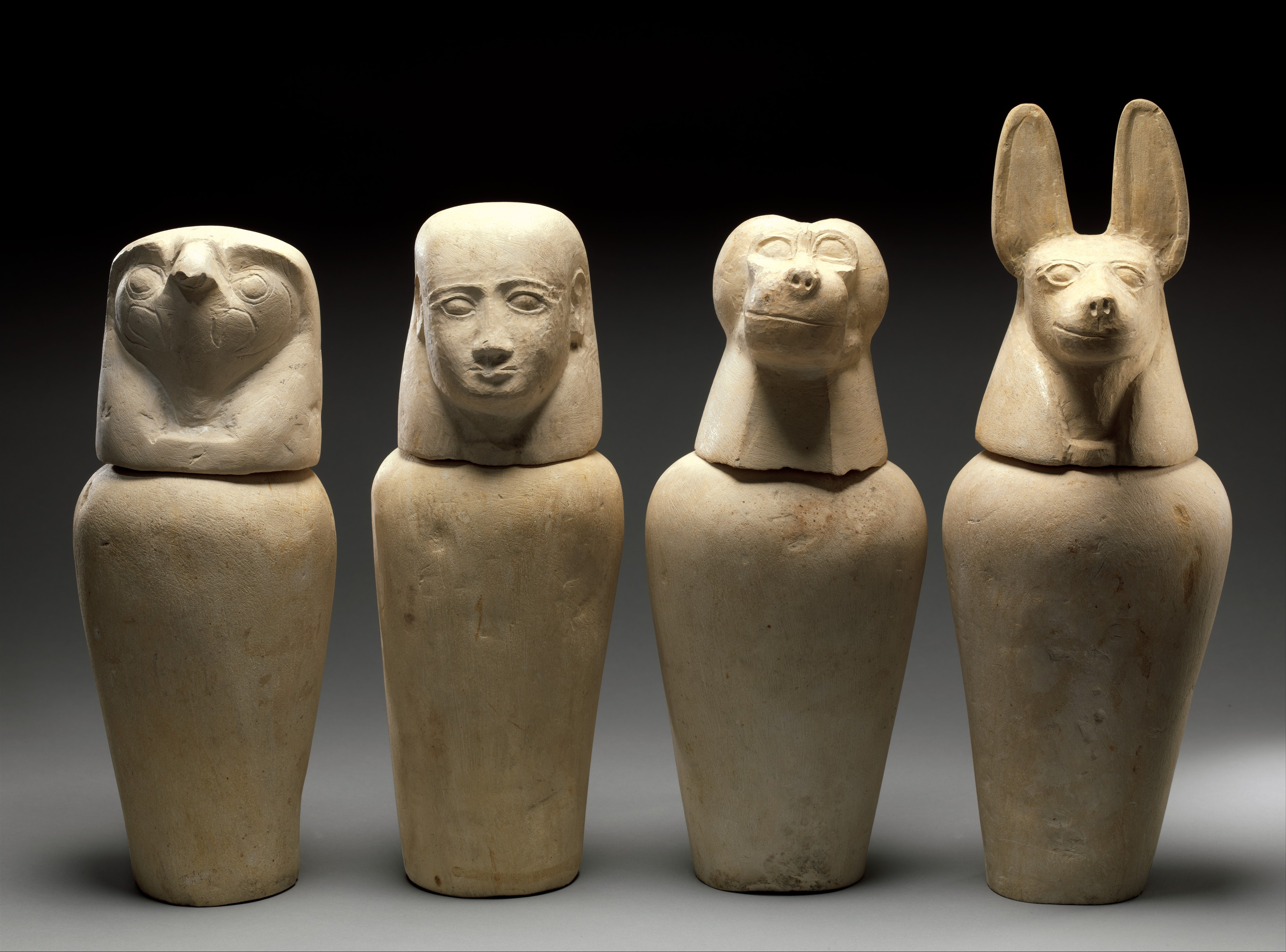
Canopic jars

The lids of reliquary or burial jars (after 2000 BC) are typically designed as figurines with cultural or religious significance. For example, later Egyptian canopic jars use lids in the form of the four children of Horus, while the Fang people attached figurines symbolizing their ancestors to containers preserving their bones. Lids could also be decorated; for example, some types of ritual Chinese wine vessels used lids decorated with historic scenes, while Roman sarcophagi may use lids imitating temple roofs or displaying a portrait of the deceased. The Sutton Hoo purse-lid is "one of the most remarkable creations of the early modern period".

The lid plays a significant role in the Greek myth of Pandora's box, actually a large jar which, upon removal of the lid, released all the evils of the world, leaving only hope behind. According to Willem Jacob Verdenius in his commentary on the work of Hesiod (who recorded the myth in his c. 700 BC poem Works and Days), "the suggestion that the fact that ἐλπίς is caught by the lid symbolizes the fact that hope always desires to be realized but never is".

== See also ==
- Closure (container)
- Plug (sanitation)
- Stopper (plug)
- Laboratory rubber stopper
