= Hutchinson Patent Stopper =

Bottle stopper

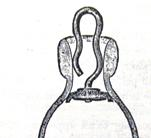
Illustration of device (closed)

Charles G. Hutchinson invented and patented the Hutchinson Patent Stopper in 1879 as a replacement for cork bottle stoppers which were commonly used as stoppers on soda water or pop bottles. His invention employed a wire spring attached to a rubber seal. Production of these stoppers was discontinued after 1912.
