= Glass Packaging Institute =

North American trade association

Logo of the Glass Packaging Institute.

The Glass Packaging Institute (GPI) is the North American trade association for the glass container industry, headquartered in Arlington, Virginia. Through GPI, glass container manufacturers advocate job preservation and industry standards, and promote sound energy, environmental, and recycling policies.

== Organization ==
The GPI membership consists of 5 glass container manufacturing member companies, and 27 supplier member companies, who provide raw materials, recycled glass, equipment, decorating, and other services to the glass companies. The country's 41 glass container plants in 20 states comprise a $5.5 billion industry. U.S. glass container manufacturers operate 102 glass furnaces, collectively producing 30 billion glass food, beverage, cosmetic, spirits, wine, and beer containers annually. The U.S. glass container industry directly employs approximately 16,500 nationwide, and its supplier and customer companies support hundreds of thousands of additional jobs.

GPI's board of trustees is the core decision-making body in the organization. It is made up of representatives from each of the glass container manufacturing member companies, as well as two representatives from the associate member companies (supplier member companies). The Trustees meet quarterly for budget, agenda and future planning purposes.

GPI hosts two meetings each year: a spring membership meeting in Washington, D.C., and an annual meeting in the fall.

Scott DeFife serves as the trade association's president.

The board is supported with a series of committees, including Marketing and Communications, Government Affairs & Regulatory Affairs, Environment, Labor & HR, Design and Specifications Committee and Management Committee.

== Container finish standards ==
GPI publishes a voluntary set of standards for glass container finishes and their closures to improve compatibility and interchangeability between manufacturers. This includes vials, wine bottles, canning jars, beer bottles, and jugs. They are specified by the nominal outside diameter in millimeters followed by the glass finish number. For example, an 8-425 finish is approximately 8 mm neck outside diameter with a 425 finish corresponding to a threaded neck typically found on small vials.
