= List of bottle types, brands and companies =

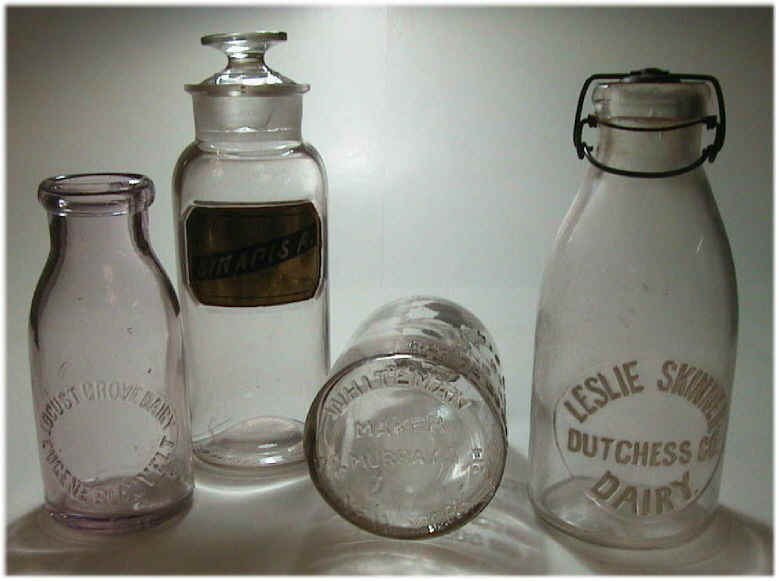
Examples of milk bottles from the late 19th century made by the Warren Glass Works Company

This is a list of bottle types, brands and companies. A bottle is a rigid container with a neck that is narrower than the body, and a "mouth". Bottles are often made of glass, clay, plastic, aluminum or other impervious materials, and are typically used to store liquids. The bottle has developed over millennia of use, with some of the earliest examples appearing in China, Phoenicia, Rome and Crete. Bottles are often recycled according to the SPI recycling code for the material. Some regions have a container deposit which is refunded after returning the bottle to the retailer.

== A ==
- Aluminum bottle

== B ==
An assortment of beer bottles

- Baby bottle

- Sippy cup

- Beer bottle

- Bottle conditioning
- De Nederlandse Bierfles (pijpje)
- Growler
- Types of beer bottles

- Bobble water bottle
- Bocksbeutel
- Borosilicate bottles
- Boston round
- Bota bag
- Bottle garden
- Bottle trap for insects
- Bridge-spouted vessel

== C ==
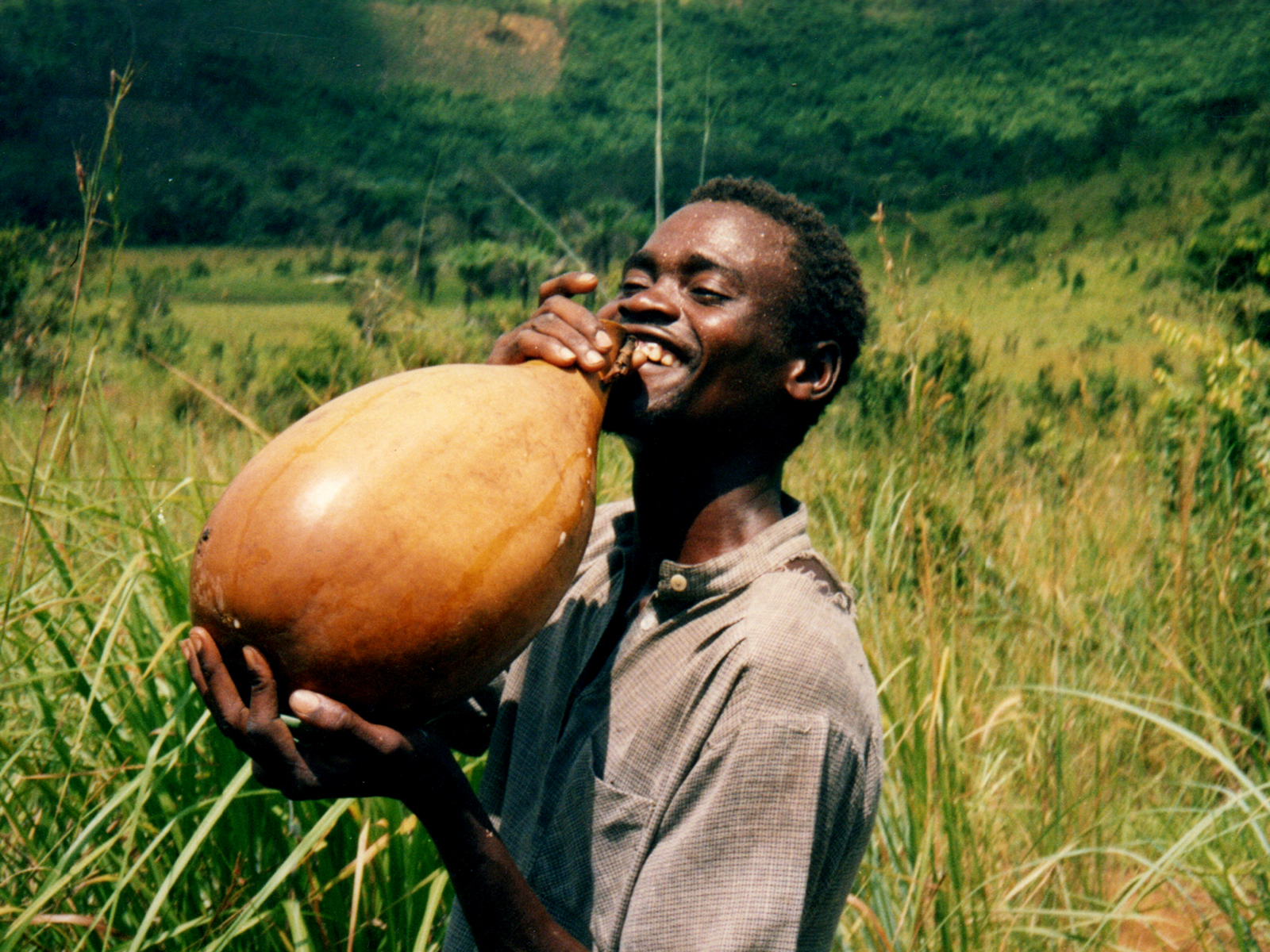
Calabashes (called nkalu in Kikongo) are used to collect and store palm wine in Bandundu Province, Democratic Republic of the Congo.

- Calabash – also known as a bottle gourd
- Canteen
- Carboy
- Coca-Cola bottle
- Hiram Codd

- Codd-neck bottle
- Whitwick bottles

== D ==
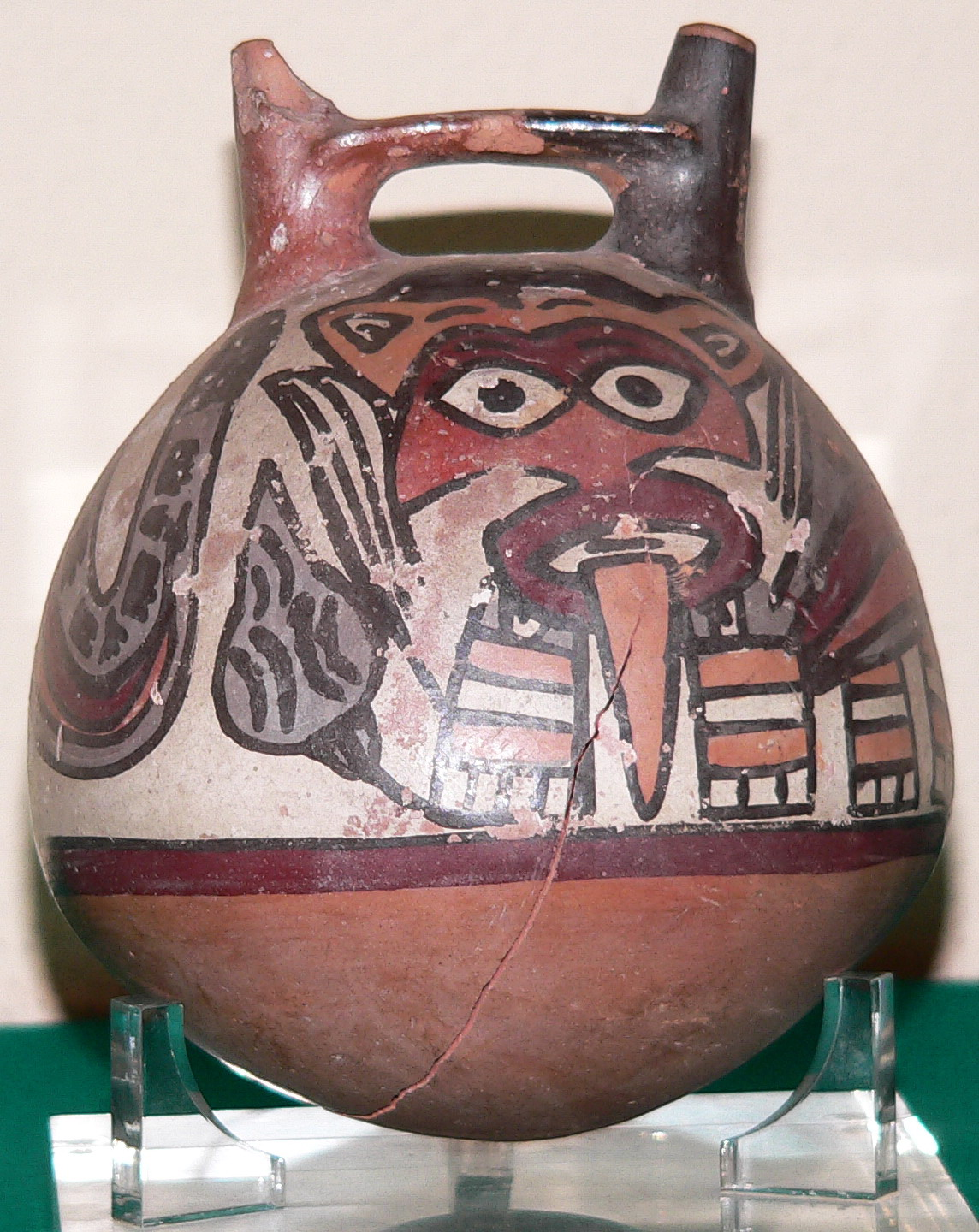
A double spout and bridge drinking vessel from the Nazca culture

- Decanter
- Double spout and bridge vessel

== E ==
- Early American molded glass
- Ekman water bottle
- Excavated or 'dug' bottles

== F ==
- Flacon
- Fiji

== G ==
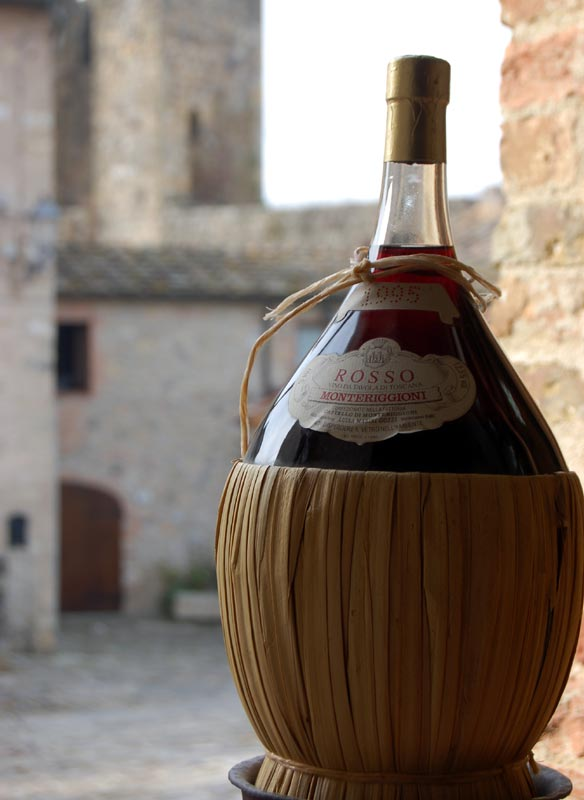
Chianti in a Fiasco bottle

- Gas cylinder

- Bailout bottle
- Diving cylinder
- Lecture bottle
- Pony bottle

- Gasogene
- Glass bottle

- Bologna bottle
- Boston round
- Fiasco
- Glass (film)
- Glass onion

- Growler (jug)

== H ==
- Hydro flask
- Hot water bottle

== I ==
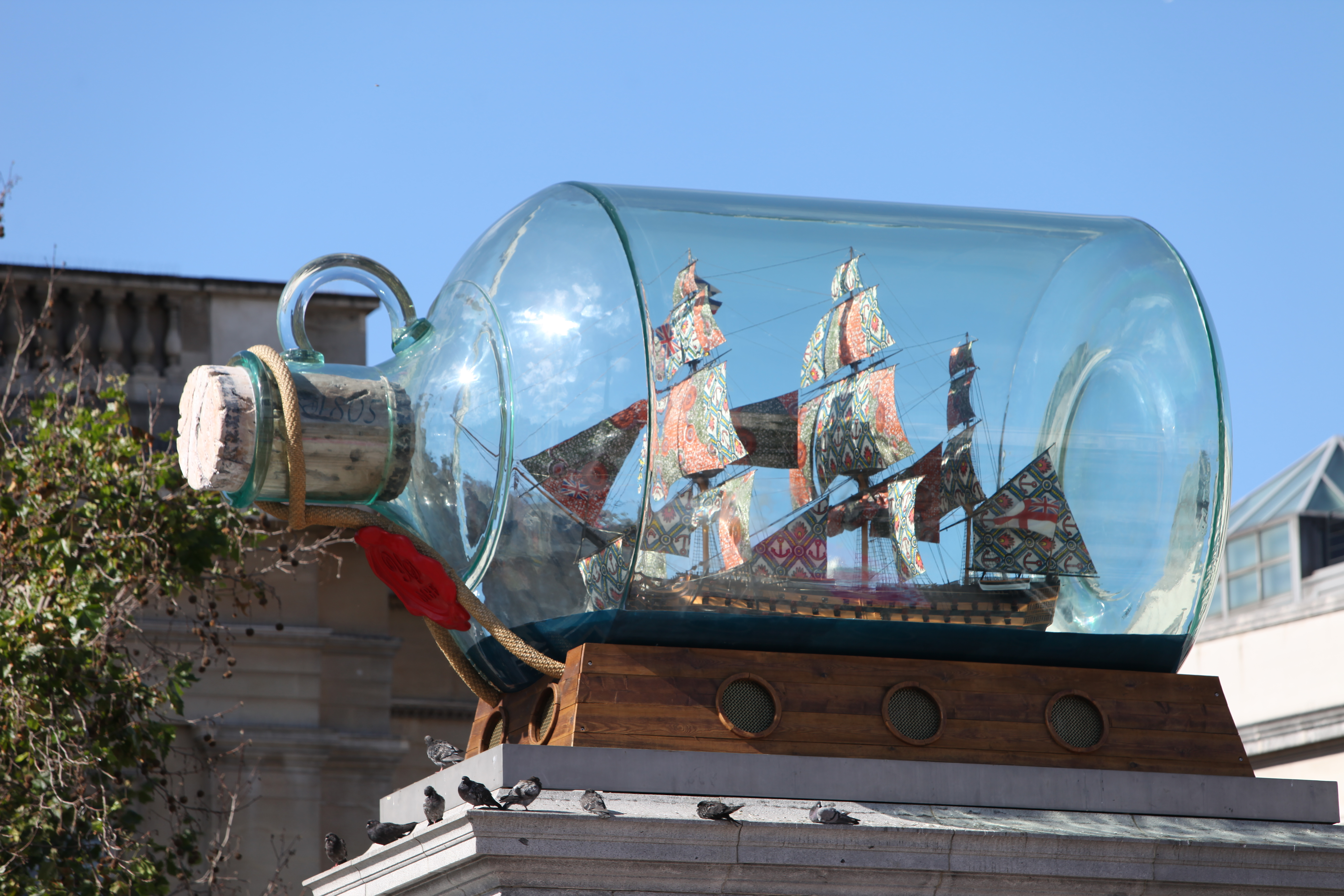
An impossible bottle – Nelson's Ship in a Bottle by Yinka Shonibare during its occupancy of the Fourth Plinth in Trafalgar Square, Central London, England

- Impossible bottle – an example includes a ship in a bottle
- Ink

== J ==
- Jerrycan

== K ==
- Keglon bottle
- Klein bottle
- Knox Glass Bottle Company

== L ==
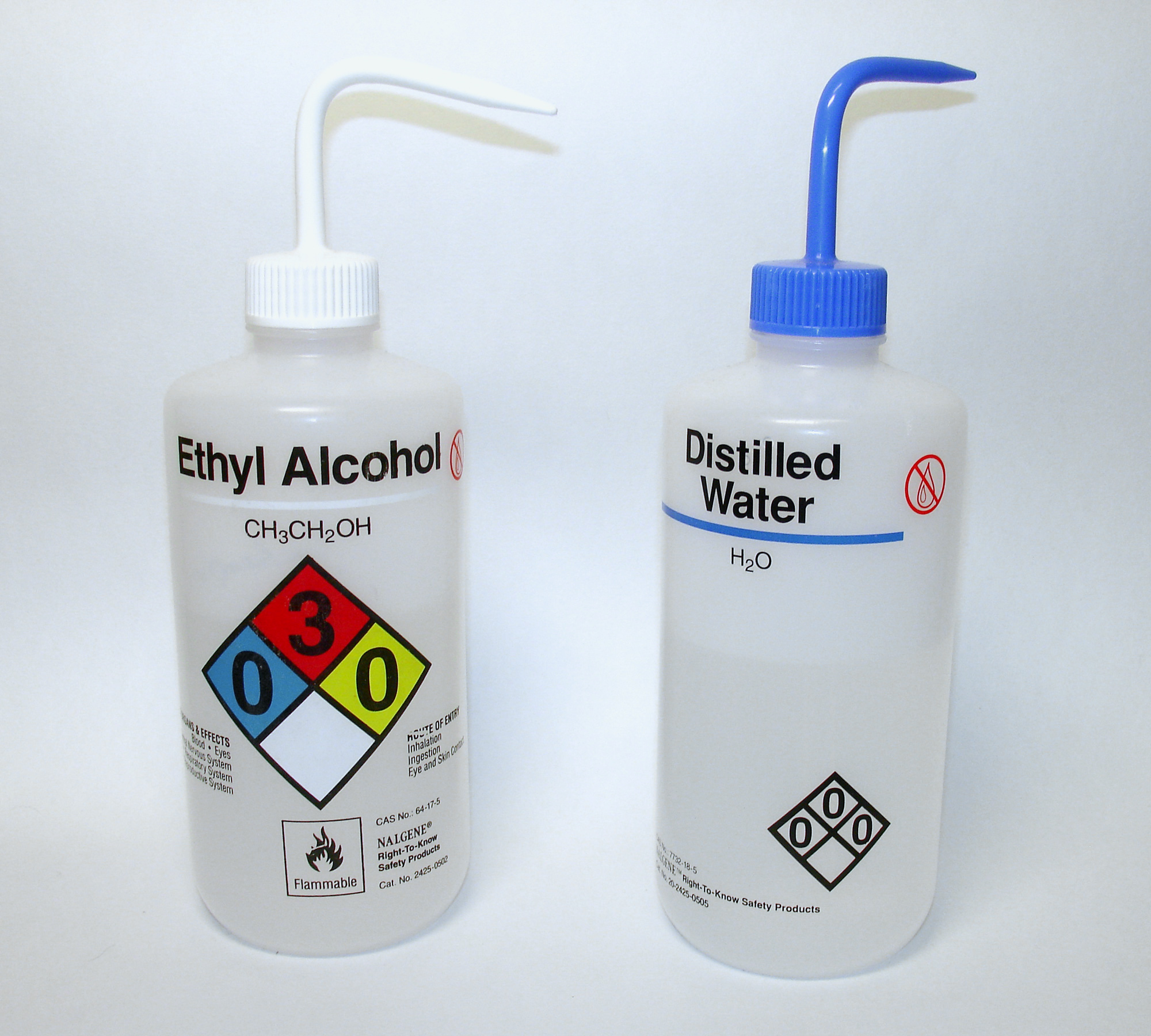
Laboratory wash bottles

- Laboratory bottles

- Laboratory flask
- Reagent bottle
- Wash bottle
- Weighing bottle

- Lacrymatory
- LifeSaver bottle

== M ==
- Magnetic bottles
- Maker's Mark bottle
- Mariotte's bottle
- Milk bottle

- Milk bottle top

== N ==
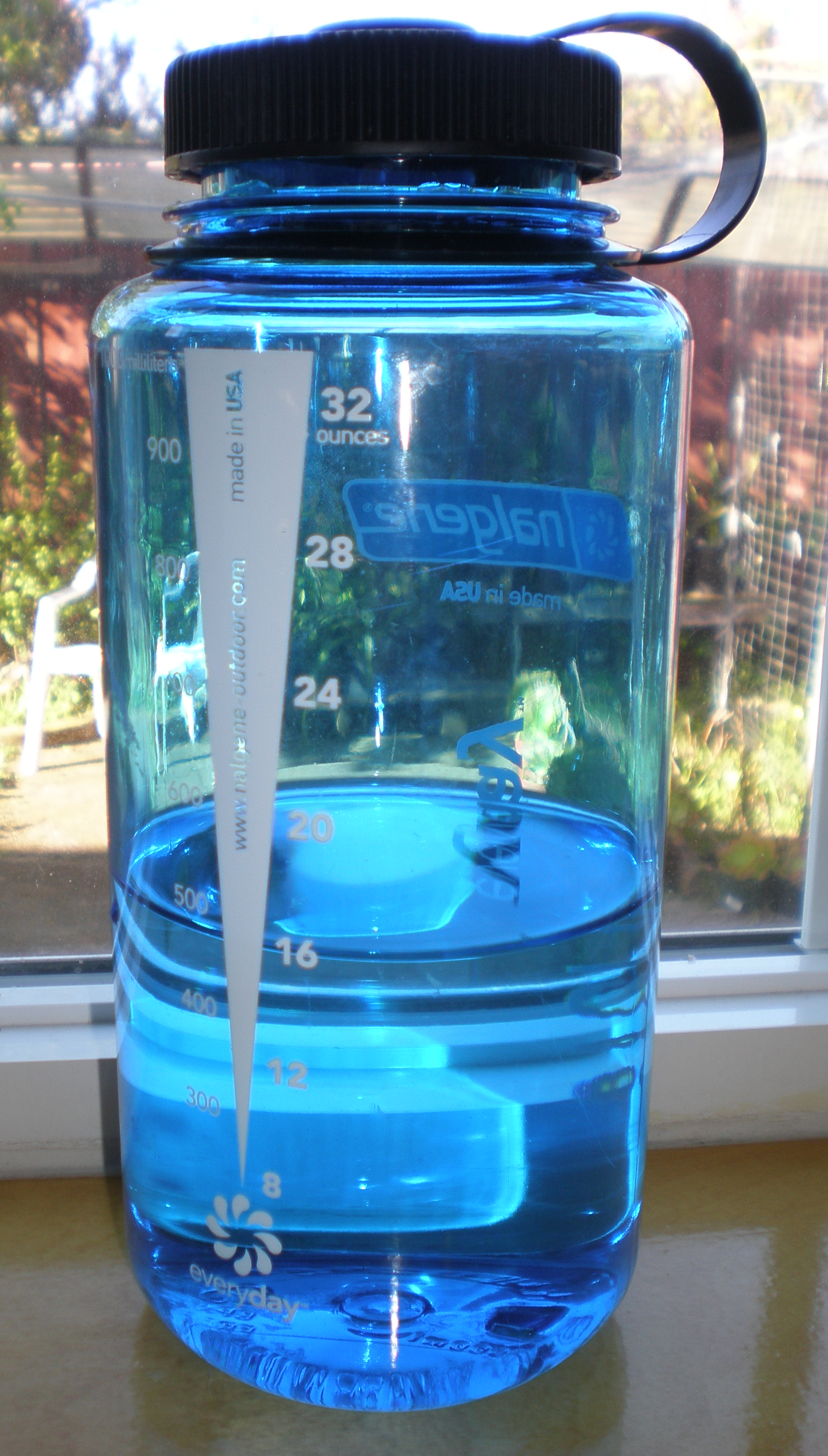
A 1000 ml wide-mouth Nalgene bottle

- Nalgene bottle
- Nansen bottle
- National Bottle Museum – located in Ballston Spa, New York

== O ==
- Owala bottles

== P ==
- Perfume bottle
- Plastic bottle

- Blowmolding machine
- Low plastic water bottle
- PET bottle recycling

- Prescription bottle
- Product Architects, Inc. – produces Polar Bottle brand insulated sport water bottles and Half Twist lifestyle bottles
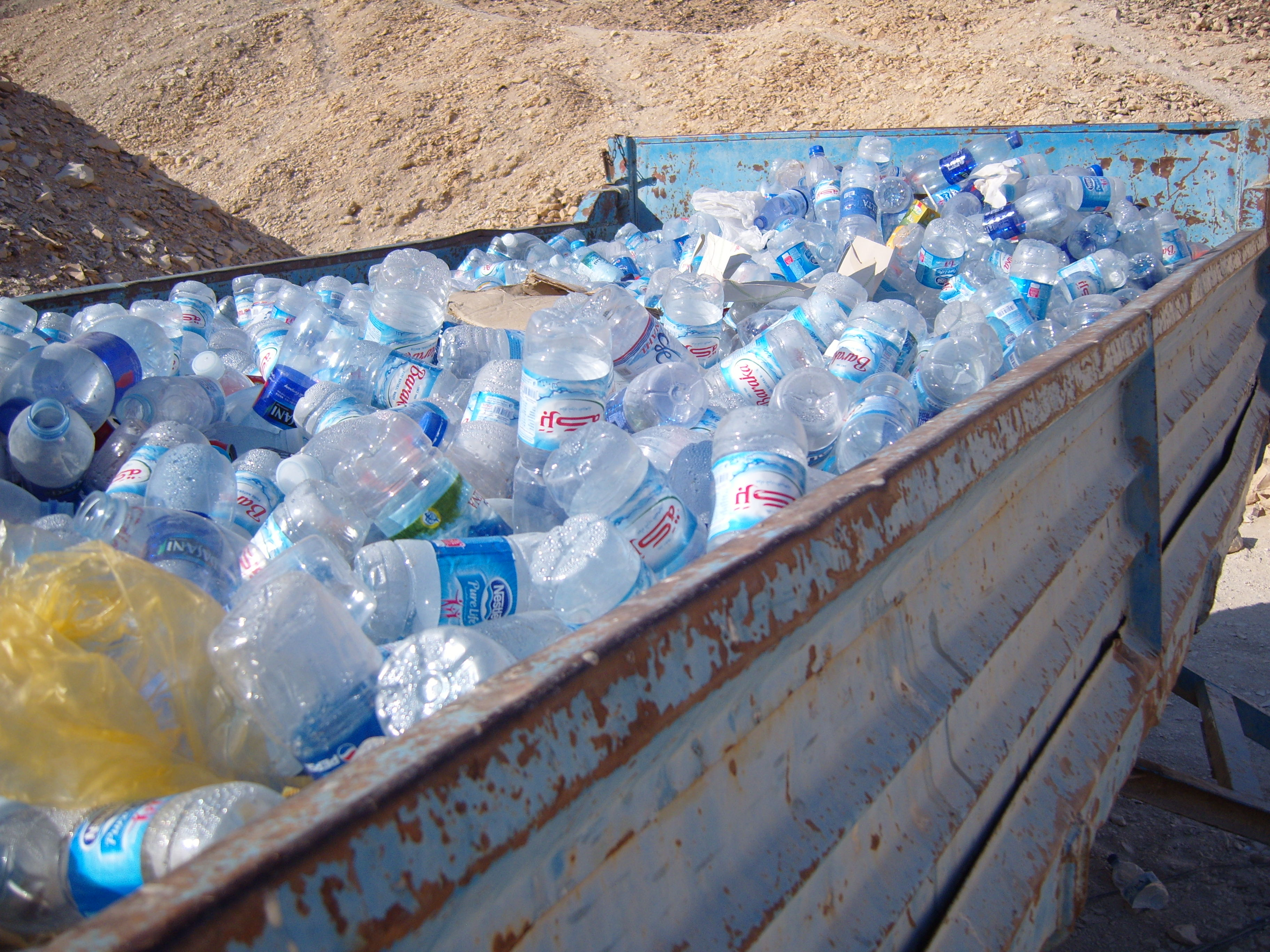
Plastic bottles

== S ==
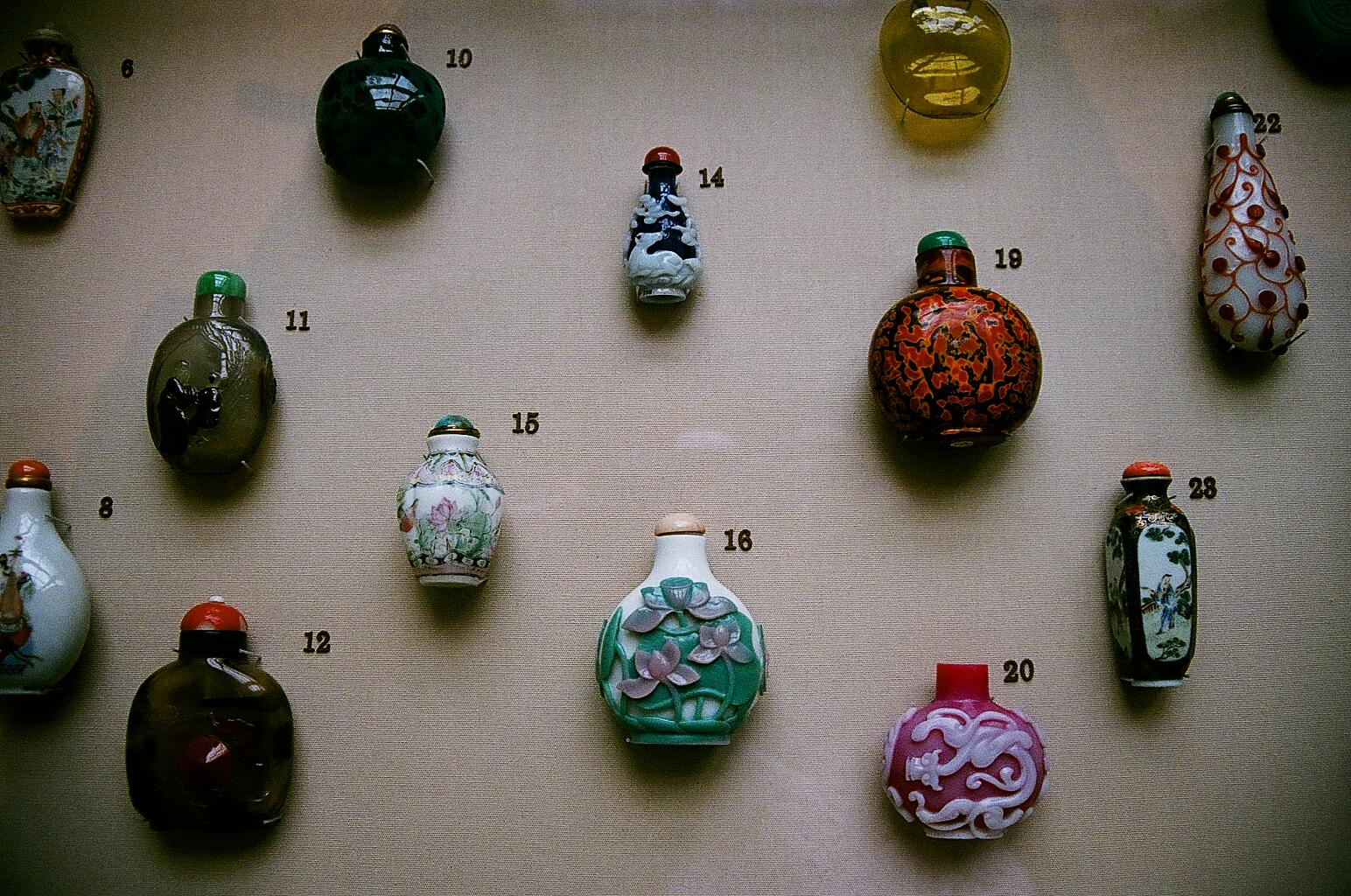
Snuff bottles in the American Museum of Natural History collection

- Safe bottle lamp
- Sealed bottles
- Seltzer bottle – also known as a soda syphon
- Shake bottle – used in bottle pool
- SIGG
- Sipper water bottle
- Snuff bottle
- Soap bottle
- Spray bottle
- Squeeze bottle
- Stanley bottle
- Stirrup jar
- Stirrup spout vessel

- Moche Crawling Feline

- S'well triple walled vacuum bottle company

== T ==
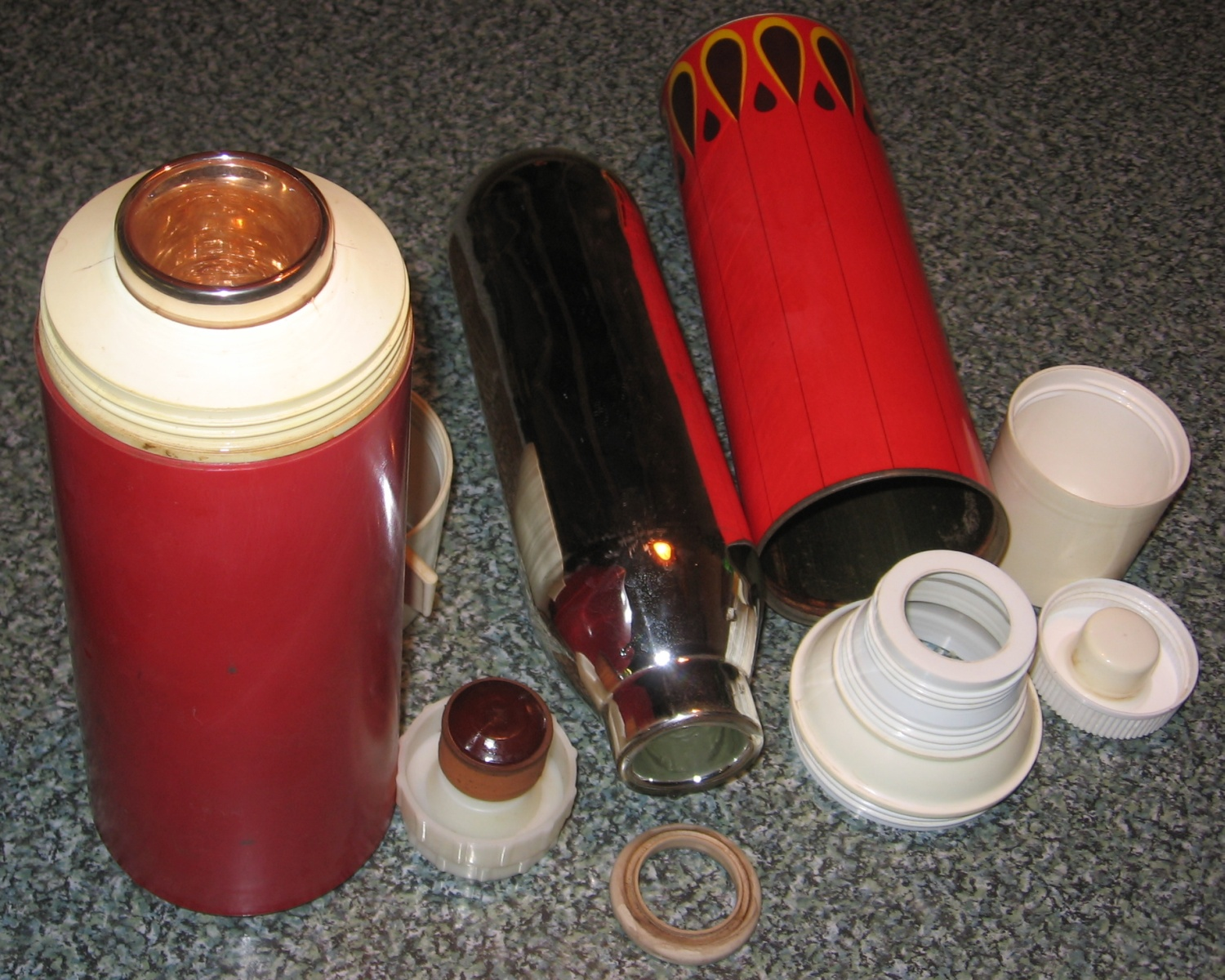
A disassembled thermos container. The vacuum flask is in the mirror-like container in the center of the image.

- Thermos – also referred to as a vacuum flask
- Thermos L.L.C.

- American Thermos Bottle Company Laurel Hill Plant

- Tuned bottles
- Two-liter bottle

== W ==
- Water bottle

- Reuse of water bottles

- Wine bottle

- Bottle variation
- Closure
- Porron

- Witch bottle

== See also ==
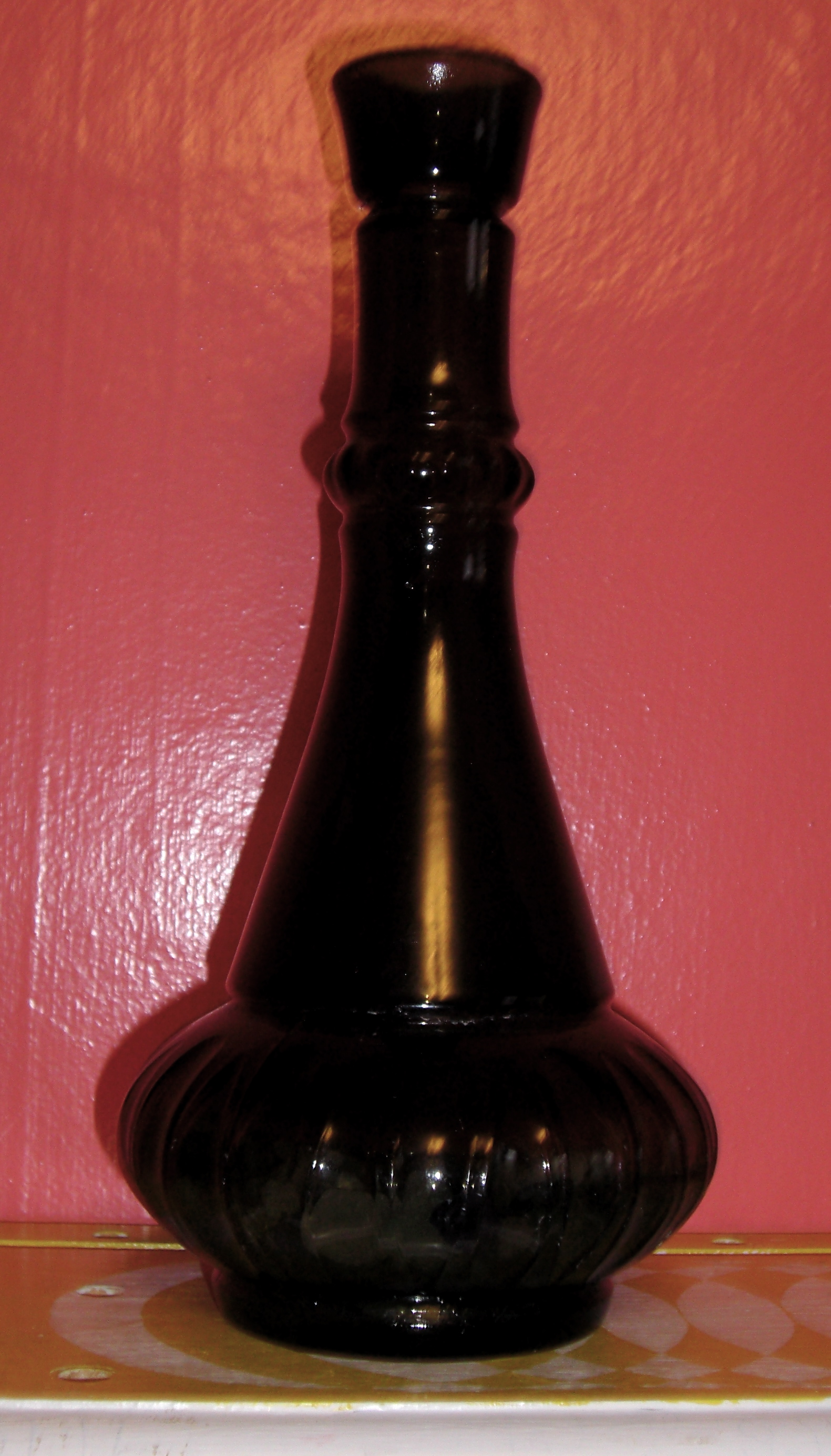
A 1970s glass genie bottle

- 99 Bottles of Beer
- Amphora
- Anchor bottler
- Bag-in-box
- Barrel
- Benewah Milk Bottle
- Beverage can
- Bottle cap
- Bottle crate
- Bottle cutting
- Bottle dynamo
- Bottle flipping
- Bottle glorifier
- Bottle jack
- Bottle-kicking
- Bottle opener
- Bottle oven
- Bottle recycling
- Bottle rocket
- Bottle scraper
- Bottle service
- Bottle Tops
- Bottle tree
- Bottle wall
- Bottled in bond
- Bottled water

- Bottled water in the United States

- Bottling company

- List of bottling companies

- Bottling (concert abuse)
- Bottling line
- Bung
- Closure
- Container deposit legislation

- Container deposit legislation in the United States

- Oregon Bottle Bill
- Tennessee Bottle Bill

- Container glass
- Fizz keeper
- Glass production
- Independent bottler
- Jar

- Mason jar

- Keg
- List of glassware
- List of pen types, brands and companies
- Message in a bottle
- Muselet
- Pitcher
- Plastic rings on tops of bottles
- Reverse vending machine
- Ring-a-bottle
- Screw cap

- Alternative wine closure
- Screw cap

- Spin the bottle
- Storage of wine
- Vase
- Water rocket

=== Bottle landmarks ===
- The Bottle, Alabama
- Brooks Catsup Bottle Water Tower
- Grandma Prisbrey's Bottle Village
- Guaranteed Pure Milk bottle
- John J. Makinen Bottle House
