= Waste minimisation =

Process that involves reducing the amount of waste produced in society

Waste hierarchy. Refusing, reducing, reusing, recycling and composting allow waste to be reduced.

Waste minimisation is a set of processes and practices intended to reduce the amount of waste produced. By reducing or eliminating the generation of harmful, persistent waste, waste minimisation supports efforts to promote a more sustainable society. Waste minimisation involves redesigning products and processes and/or changing societal patterns of consumption and production.

The most environmentally resourceful, economically efficient, and cost effective way to manage waste often is to not have to address the problem in the first place. Managers see waste minimisation as a primary focus for most waste management strategies. Proper waste treatment and disposal can require a significant amount of time and resources; therefore, the benefits of waste minimisation can be considerable if carried out in an effective, safe and sustainable manner.

Traditional waste management focuses on processing waste after it is created, concentrating on re-use, recycling, and waste-to-energy conversion. Waste minimisation involves efforts to avoid creating the waste during manufacturing. To effectively implement waste minimisation the manager requires knowledge of the production process, cradle-to-grave analysis (the tracking of materials from their extraction to their return to Earth) and details of the composition of the waste.

The main sources of waste vary from country to country. In the UK, most waste comes from the construction and demolition of buildings, followed by mining and quarrying, industry and commerce. Household waste constitutes a relatively small proportion of all waste. Industrial waste is often tied to requirements in the supply chain. For example, a company handling a product may insist that it should be shipped using particular packing because it fits downstream needs.

Proponents of waste minimisation state that manufactured products at the end of their useful life should be utilised as a resource for recycling and reuse rather than waste.

== Benefits ==
Waste minimisation can protect the environment and often turns out to have positive economic benefits. Waste minimisation can improve:

- Efficient production practices – waste minimisation can achieve more output of product per unit of input of raw materials.
- Economic returns – more efficient use of products means reduced costs of purchasing new materials, improving the financial performance of a company.
- Public image – the environmental profile of a company is an important part of its overall reputation and waste minimisation reflects a proactive movement towards environmental protection.
- Quality of products produced – innovations and technological practices can reduce waste generation and improve the quality of the inputs in the production phase.
- Environmental responsibility – minimising or eliminating waste generation makes it easier to meet targets of environmental regulations, policies, and standards; the environmental impact of waste will be reduced.

== Industries ==
In industry, using more efficient manufacturing processes and better materials generally reduces waste production. The application of waste minimisation techniques has led to the development of innovative and commercially successful replacement products.

Waste minimisation efforts often require investment, which is usually compensated by the savings. However, waste reduction in one part of the production process may create waste production in another part.

Overpackaging is the use of excess packaging. Eliminating it can result in source reduction, reducing waste before it is generated by proper package design and practice. The use of minimised packaging is key to working toward sustainable packaging.

== Processes ==
- Reuse of scrap material

Scraps can be immediately reincorporated at the beginning of the manufacturing line so they do not become waste. Many industries routinely do this; for example, paper mills return any damaged rolls to the beginning of the production line, and in the manufacture of plastic items, off-cuts and scrap are re-incorporated into new products.

- Improved quality control and process monitoring

Steps can be taken to keep the number of reject batches to a minimum. This is achieved by increasing the frequency of inspection and the number of points of inspection. For example, installing automated continuous monitoring equipment can help to identify production problems at an early stage.

- Waste exchanges

This is where the waste product of one process becomes the raw material for a second process. Waste exchanges represent another way of reducing waste disposal volumes for waste that cannot be eliminated.

- Ship to point of use

This involves delivering incoming raw materials or components directly to the point where they are assembled or used in the manufacturing process to minimise handling and the use of protective wrappings or enclosures (example: Fish-booking).

- Zero waste

This is a whole-systems approach that aims to eliminate waste at the source and at all points down the supply chain, with the intention of producing no waste. It is a design philosophy which emphasizes waste prevention as opposed to end-of-pipe waste management. Since, globally speaking, waste as such, however minimal, can never be prevented (there will always be an end-of-life even for recycled products and materials), a related goal is prevention of pollution.

- Minimalism

Minimalism often refers to the concepts of art and music, even though a minimal lifestyle could make a huge impact for waste management and producing zero waste, which can reduce the amount of waste that goes to landfills and environmental pollution. When the endless consumption is reduced to a minimum of only necessary consumption, the careless production towards the demand will be reduced. A minimal lifestyle can impact climate justice by reducing waste. Joshua Fields Millburn and Ryan Nicodemus directed and produced a movie called Minimalism: A Documentary that showcased the idea of minimal living in the modern world.

=== Product design ===
==== Universal connectors ====
Utilizing a charger port that can be used by any phone. The implementation of USB-C to reduce excess wires that end up in the waste that give off toxic chemicals that harm the planet.

=== Reusable shopping bags ===
Reusable bags are a visible form of re-use, and some stores offer a "bag credit" for reusable shopping bags although at least one chain reversed its policy, claiming "it was just a temporary bonus". In contrast, one study suggests that a bag tax is a more effective incentive than a similar discount. (Of note, the before/after study compared a circumstance in which some stores offered a discount vs. a circumstance in which all stores applied the tax.) While there is a minor inconvenience, this may remedy itself, as reusable bags are generally more convenient for carrying groceries.

== Households ==
This section details some waste minimisation techniques for householders.

Appropriate amounts and sizes can be chosen when purchasing goods; buying large containers of paint for a small decorating job or buying larger amounts of food than can be consumed create unnecessary waste. Also, if a pack or can is to be thrown away, any remaining contents must be removed before the container can be recycled.

Home composting, the practice of turning kitchen and garden waste into compost can be considered waste minimisation.

The resources that households use can be reduced considerably by using electricity thoughtfully (e.g. turning off lights and equipment when not needed) and by reducing the number of car journeys. Individuals can reduce the amount of waste they create by buying fewer products and by buying products which last longer. Mending broken or worn clothing or equipment also contributes to minimising household waste. Individuals can minimise their water usage, and walk or cycle to their destination rather than using their car to save fuel and cut down emissions.

In a domestic situation, the potential for minimisation is often dictated by lifestyle. Some people may view it as wasteful to purchase new products solely to follow fashion trends when the older products are still usable. Adults working full-time have little free time, and so may have to purchase more convenient foods that require little preparation, or prefer disposable nappies if there is a baby in the family.

The amount of waste an individual produces is a small portion of all waste produced by society, and personal waste reduction can only make a small impact on overall waste volumes. Yet, influence on policy can be exerted in other areas. Increased consumer awareness of the impact and power of certain purchasing decisions allows industry and individuals to change the total resource consumption. Consumers can influence manufacturers and distributors by avoiding products that lack eco-labelling, which is currently not mandatory, or choosing products that minimise packaging. In the UK, PullApart combines both environmental and consumer packaging surveys, in a curbside packaging recycling classification system to minimise waste. Where reuse schemes are available, consumers can be proactive and use them.

== Healthcare facilities ==
Healthcare establishments are massive producers of waste. The major sources of healthcare waste are: hospitals, laboratories and research centres, mortuary and autopsy centres, animal research and testing laboratories, blood banks and collection services, and nursing homes for the elderly.

Waste minimisation can offer many opportunities to these establishments to use fewer resources, be less wasteful and generate less hazardous waste. Good management and control practices among health-care facilities can have a significant effect on the waste generated each day.

=== Practices ===
There are many examples of more efficient practices that can encourage waste minimisation in healthcare establishments and research facilities.

Source reduction

- Purchasing reductions which ensures the selection of supplies that are less wasteful or less hazardous.
- The use of physical rather than chemical cleaning methods such as steam disinfection instead of chemical disinfection.
- Preventing the unnecessary wastage of products in nursing and cleaning activities.

Management and control measures at hospital level

- Centralized purchasing of hazardous chemicals.
- Monitoring the flow of chemicals within the health care facility from receipt as a raw material to disposal as a hazardous waste.
- The careful separation of waste matter to help minimise the quantities of hazardous waste and disposal.

Stock management of chemical and pharmaceutical products

- Frequent ordering of relatively small quantities rather than large quantities at one time.
- Using the oldest batch of a product first to avoid expiration dates and unnecessary waste.
- Using all the contents of a container containing hazardous waste.
- Checking the expiry date of all products at the time of delivery.

== Culture of packaging reuse ==
In some countries, such as Germany, people have established a deeper culture of packaging waste reduction than in other countries. The Mach Mehrweg Pool ("Make Reuse Pool") is an effort initially conceived by milk producers to harmonize and share reusable milk containers, which in more recent years was expanded to include reusable packaging for additional types of food, such as coffee. People have devised ways to bring back containers for yoghurt, cooking oil, marmalade and many other types of food and refill them there.

== Legal mandates ==
The European Union (EU) has set packaging reduction targets that require member states to reduce packaging, especially plastic packaging. Some types of single-use plastic packaging, including packaging for unprocessed fresh fruits and vegetables; for foods and beverages filled and consumed in cafés and restaurants; for individual portions (for example, sugar, condiments, sauces); and for miniature packaging for toiletries; as well as shrink-wrap for suitcases in airports, would be banned effective 1 January 2030. More generally, the EU has set mandatory reduction targets for plastic packaging have been set as follows: 5% by 2030, 10% by 2035 and 15% by 2040.

== See also ==
- Bottle cutting
- Cleaner production
- Durable good
- Eco-action
- Ecological economics
- Ecological sanitation
- European Week for Waste Reduction
- Extended producer responsibility
- Food waste
- Green consumption
- Green economy
- Household hazardous waste
- Life-cycle assessment
- List of waste management acronyms
- Litter
- Miniwaste
- Pallet crafts
- Planned obsolescence
- Recycling
- Reusable launch vehicle
- Reusable packaging
- Reuse of bottles
- Reuse of human excreta
- Reuse
- Right to repair
- Source reduction
- Sustainable sanitation
- Upcycling
- Waste hierarchy
- Waste management
- Zero waste
