= Pallet crafts =

Crafts and projects which use discarded wooden shipping pallets

Pallets reused as benches
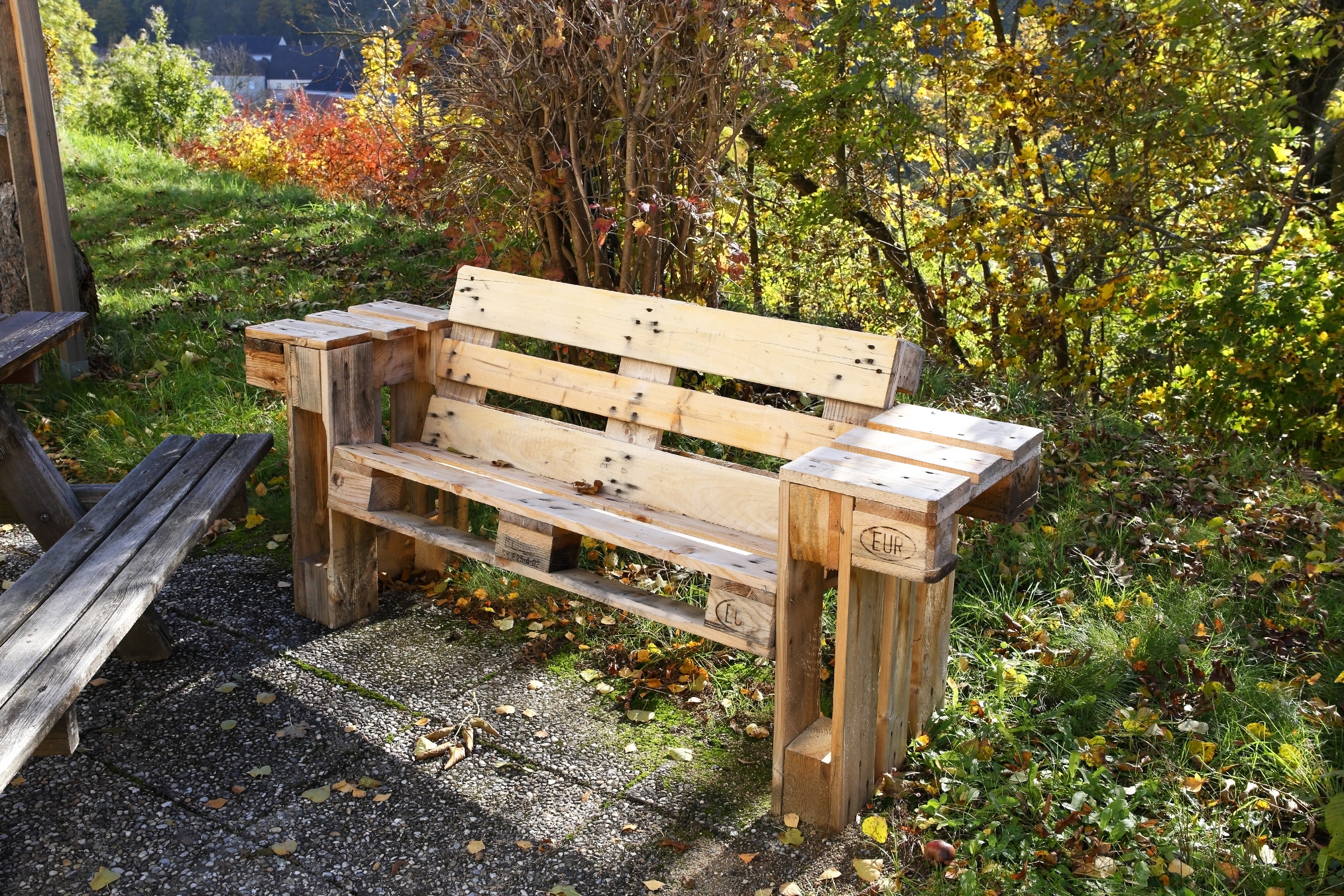
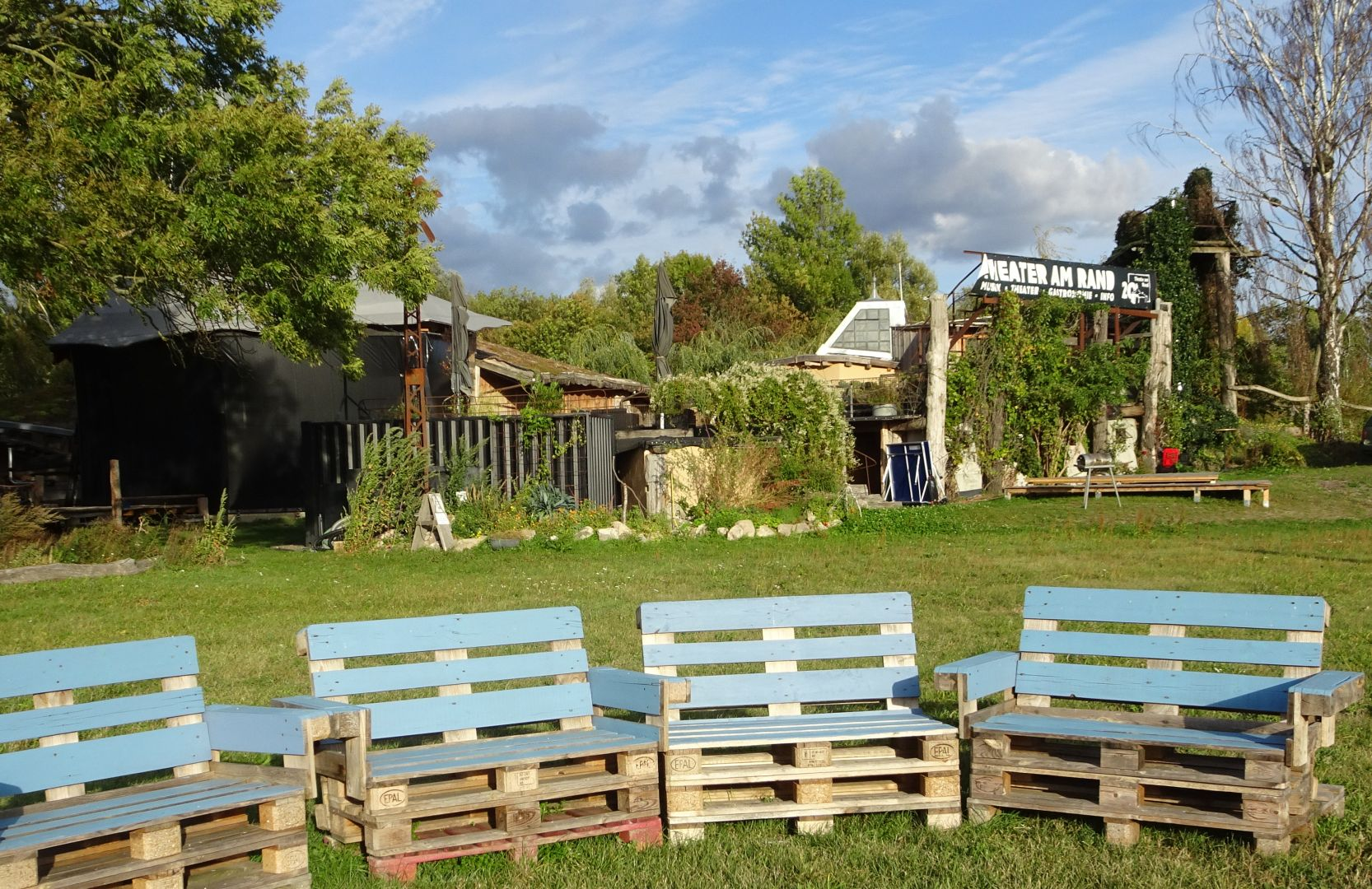

Pallet crafts are crafts and projects which use discarded wooden shipping pallets.

Wooden pallets are often used for shipping products, but when these get old, they are often thrown away. However, there are many ways to recycle old pallets.

Issue 14 of ReadyMade magazine issued out a MacGyver-like challenge to find some way to reuse shipping pallets. In the following two issues, plans and pictures for winning submissions were shown. Winning submissions included:

- A bench
- A picnic set
- A chair and table set
- A lounge chair
- A raised garden bed

One can also find plans online for other craft projects using pallets, such as plans for:

- Compost bins
- Birdhouses
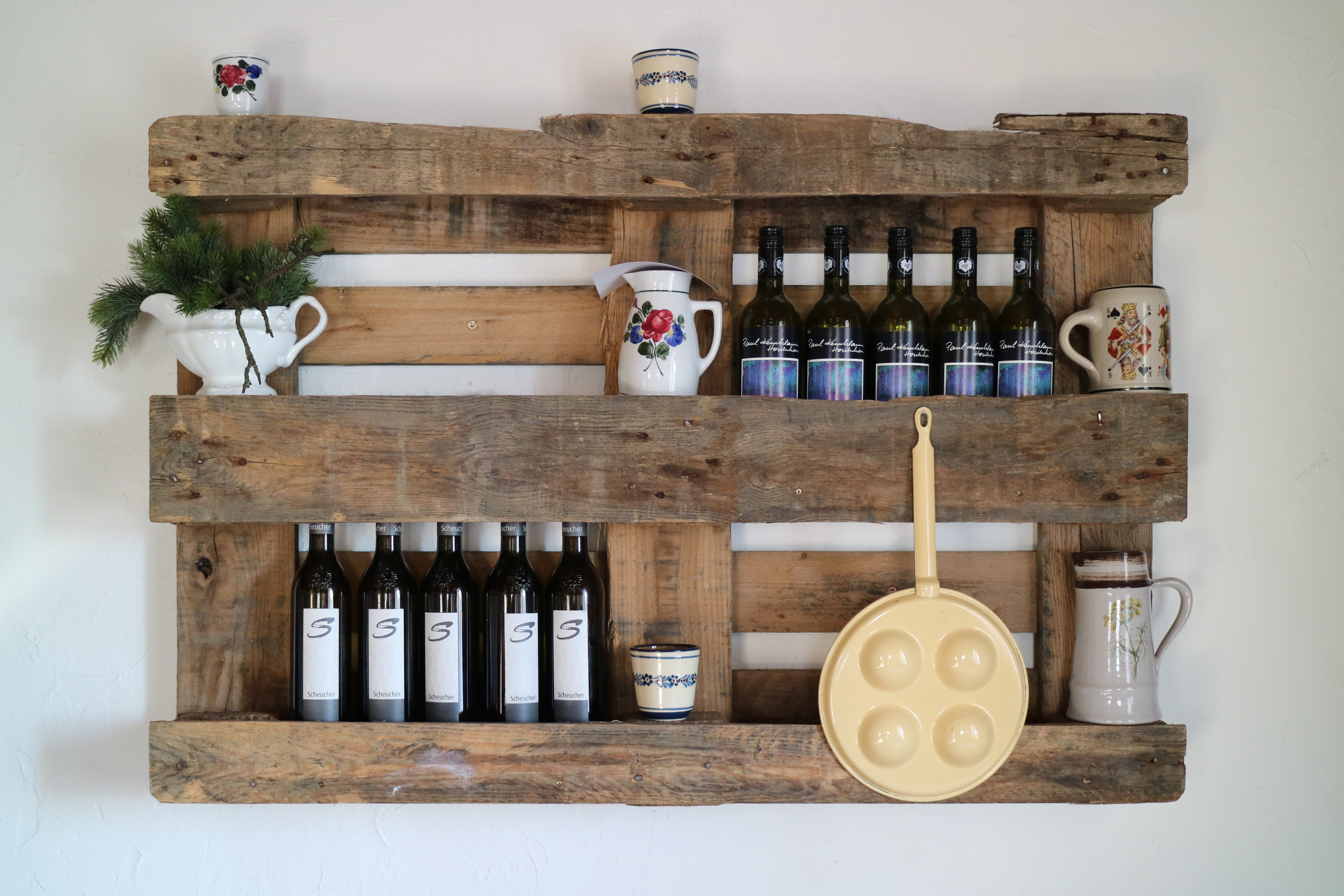
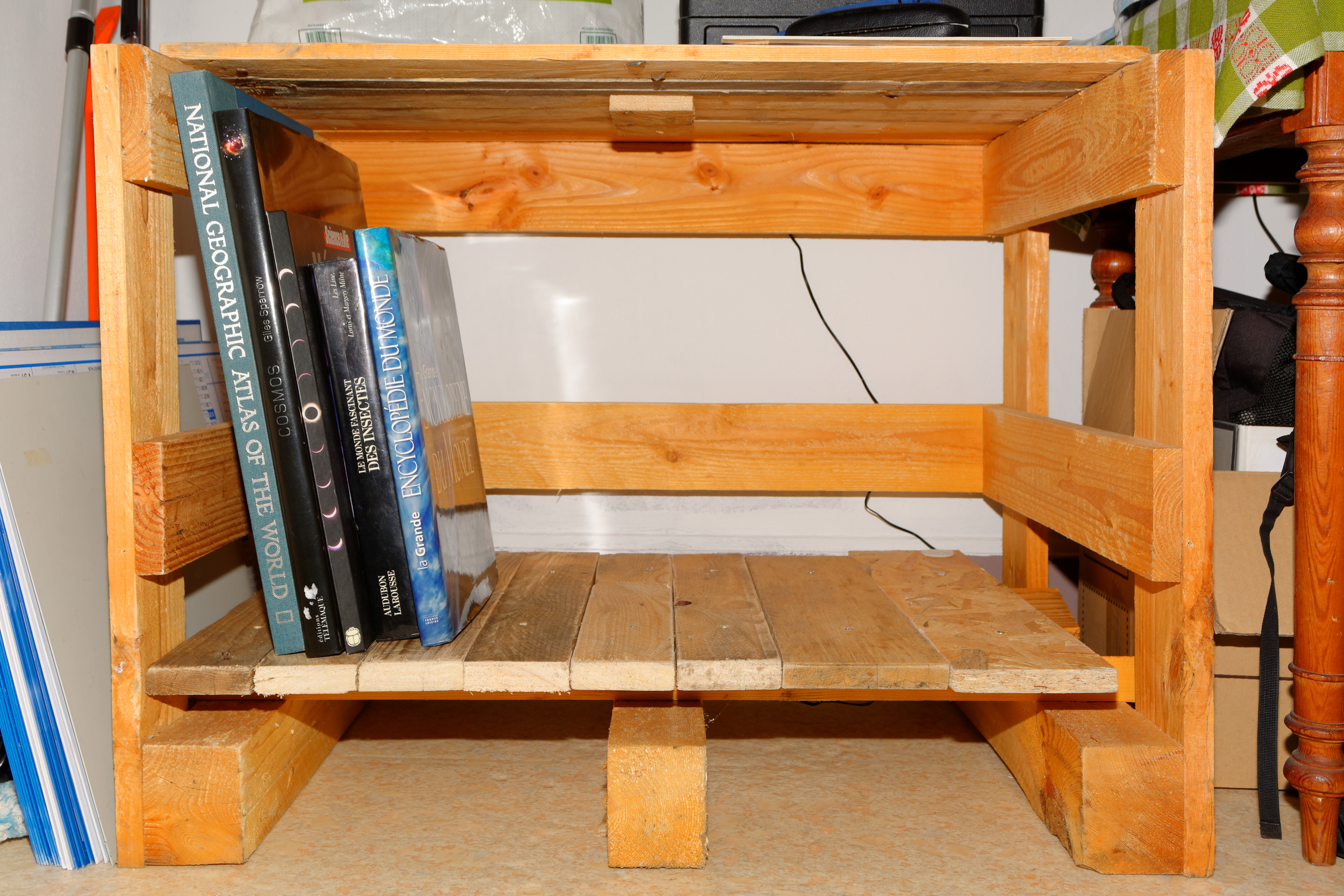
A wall shelf made from a wooden pallet (left) and a bookshelf made from wooden pallets (right)

Also, one can read about how people have made various things out of pallets, such as:

- Guitars, including American guitar maker, Taylor Guitars
- Beds, sofas, swings and garden furniture
- Headboards to console tables

== Gallery ==
=== Insect hotels ===
Insect hotels made from wooden pallets
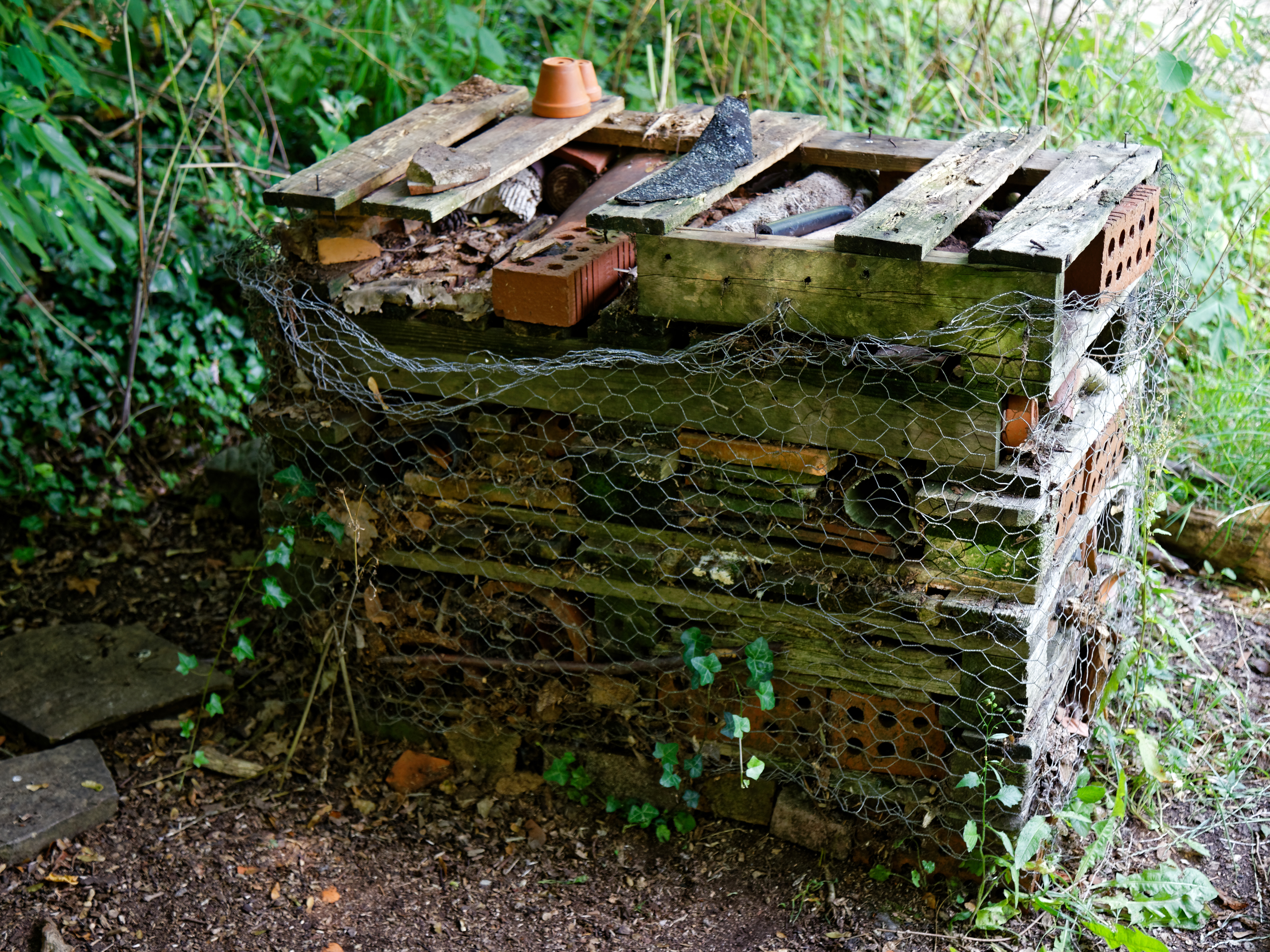

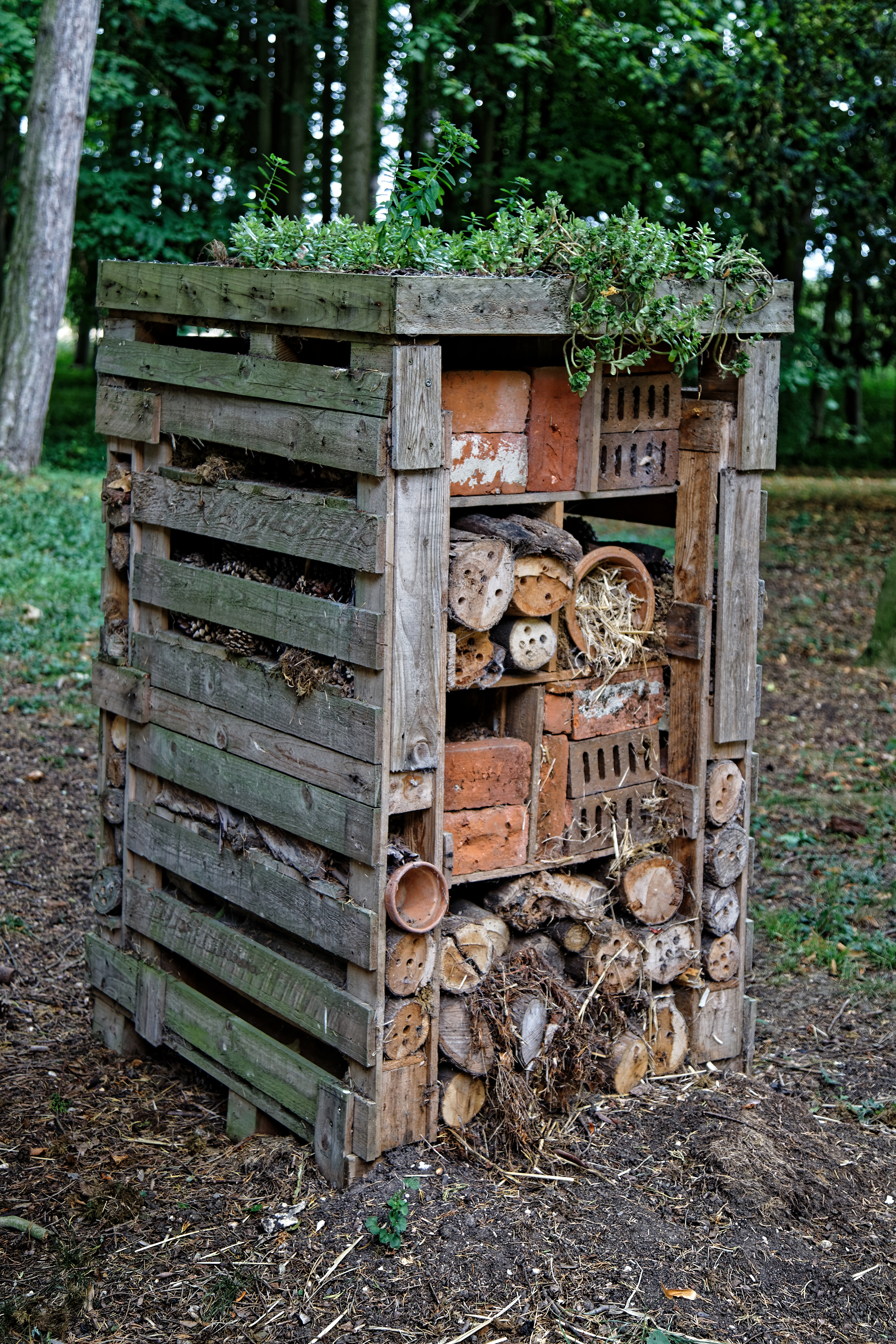
Planters made from wooden pallets
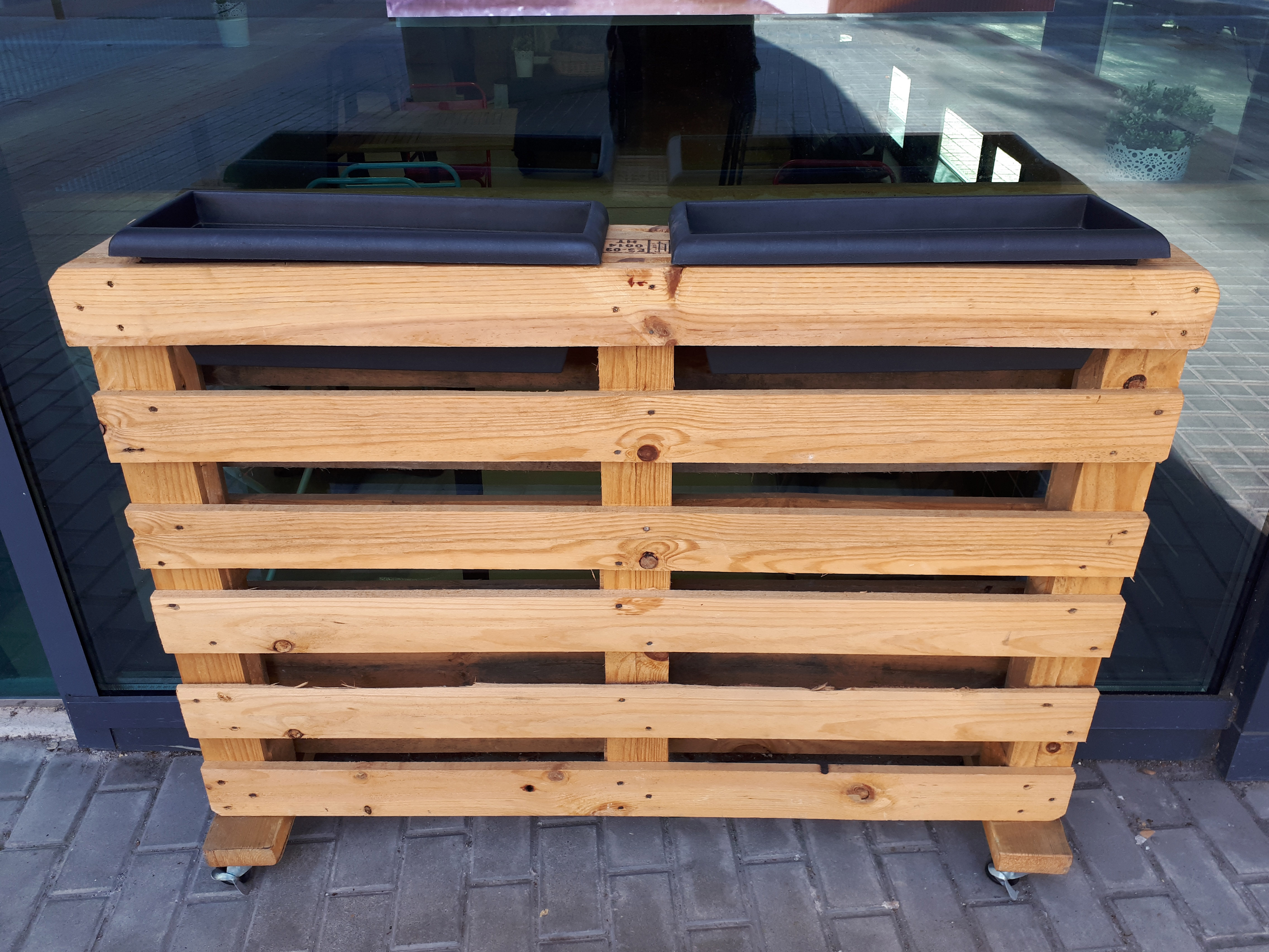

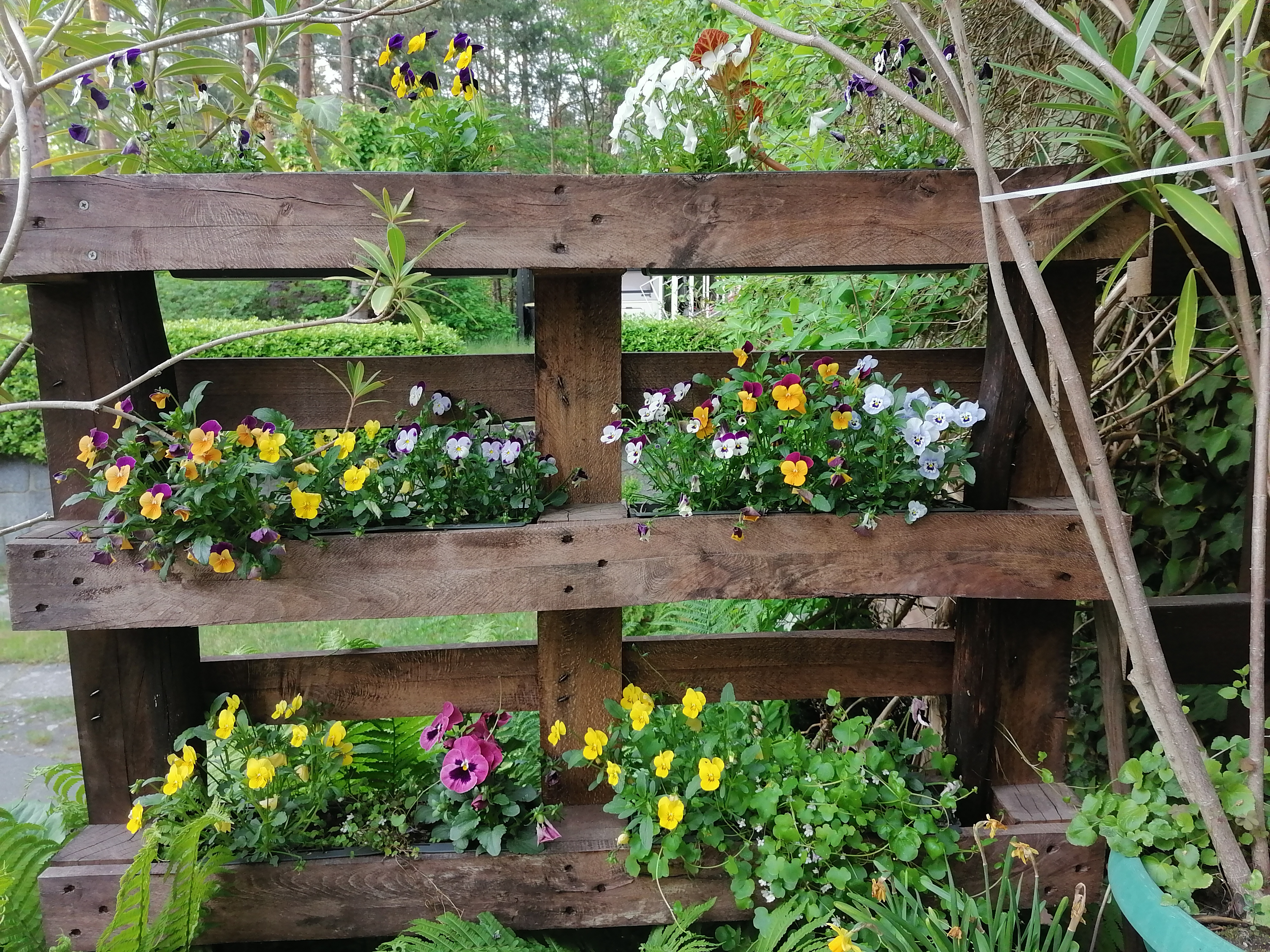

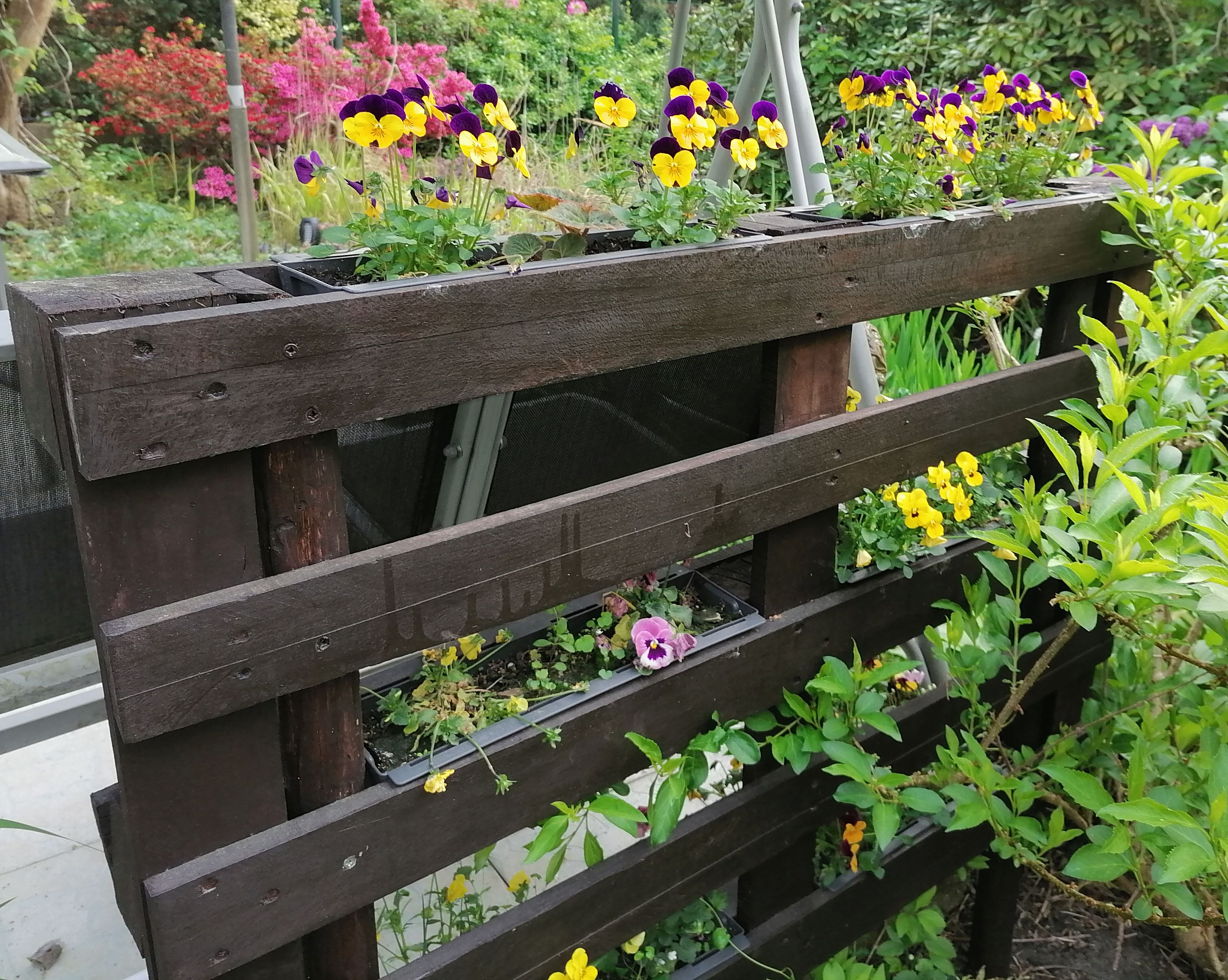

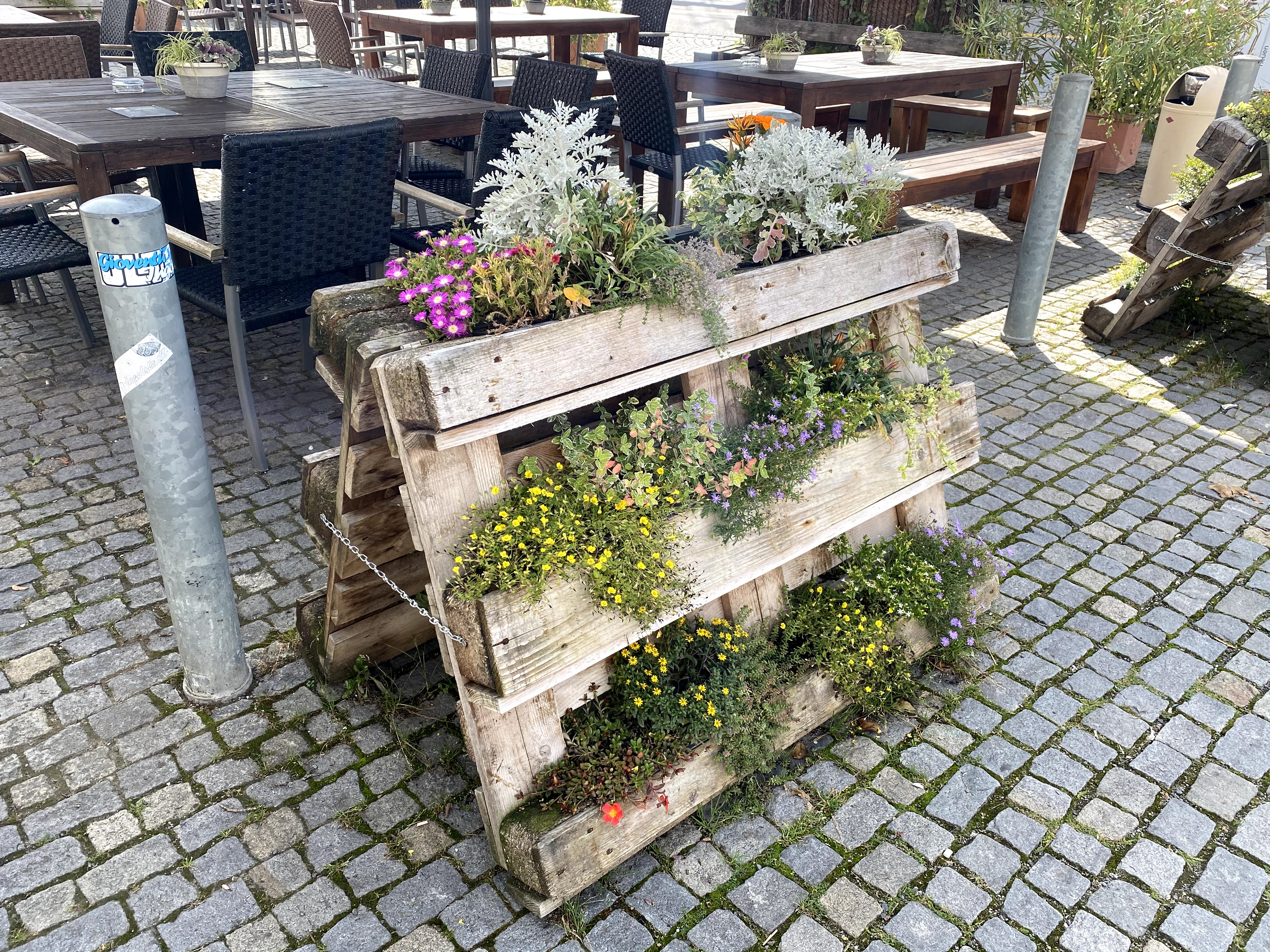
Seating and tables using wooden pallets
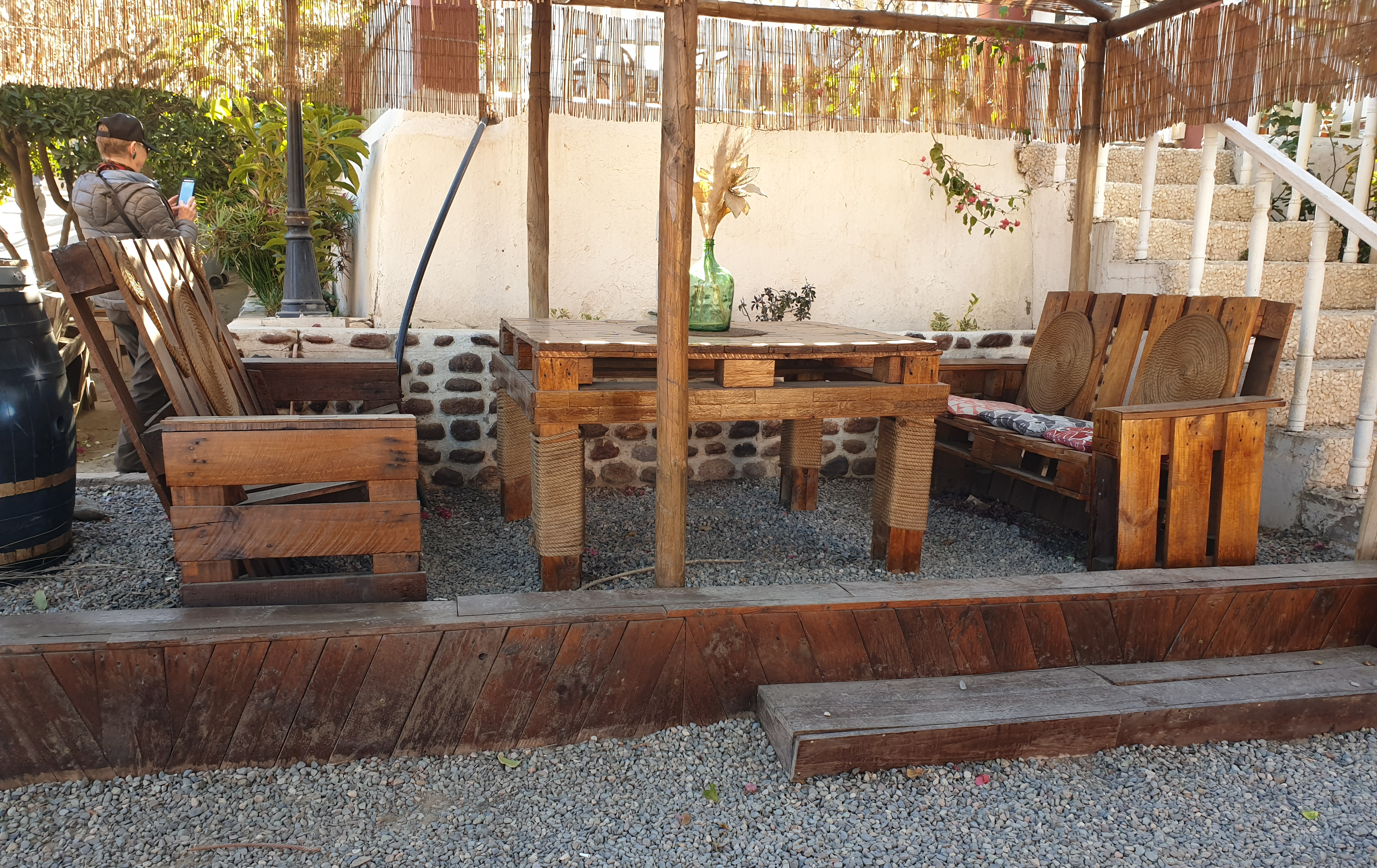

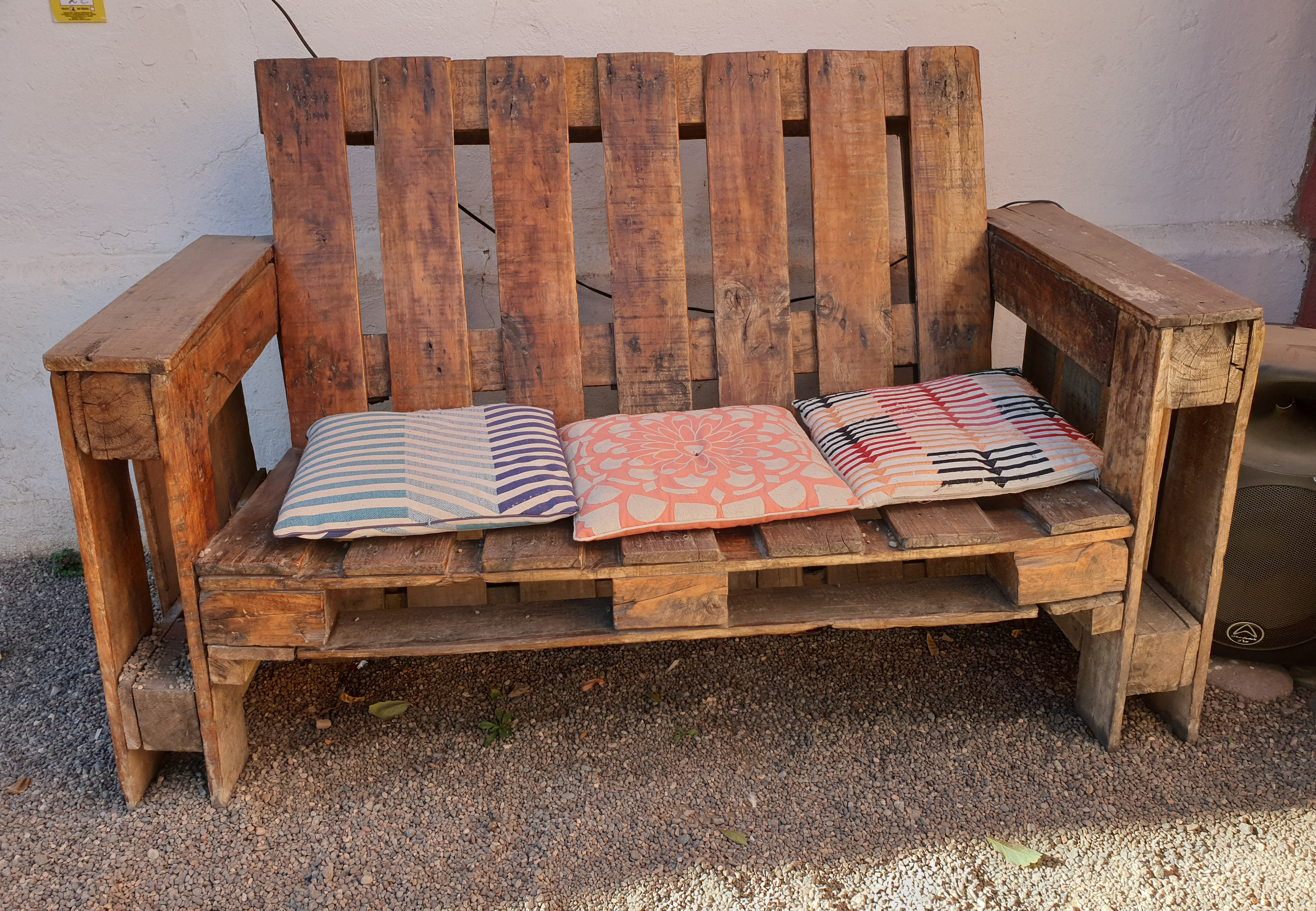

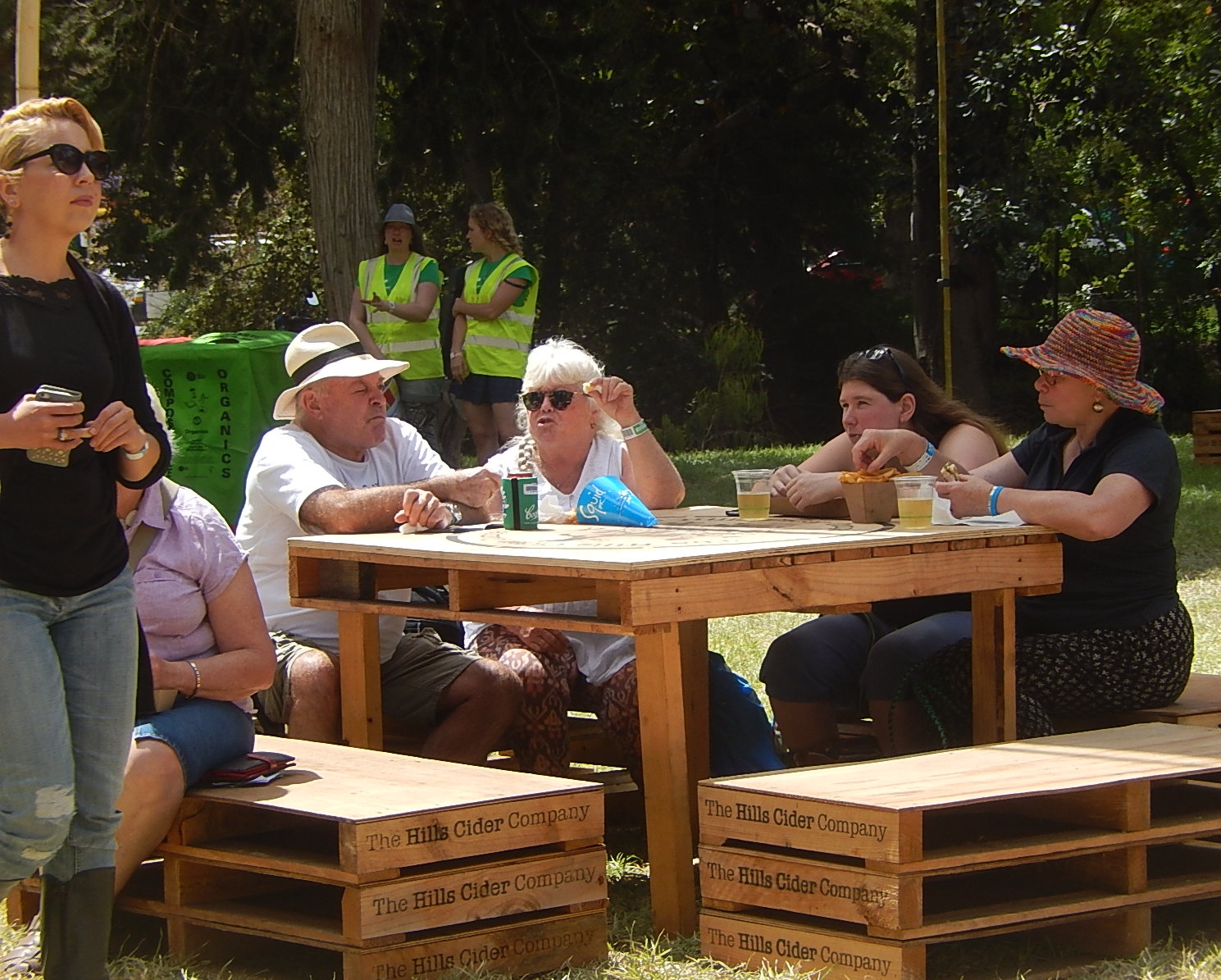

== See also ==
- Bottle cutting
- Bottle recycling
- Green building and wood
- Reclaimed lumber
- Reusable packaging
- Reuse of bottles
- Timber recycling
- Upcycling
- Waste minimisation
