= Container glass =

Type of glass used for glass containers

- Material type: Soda-lime glass

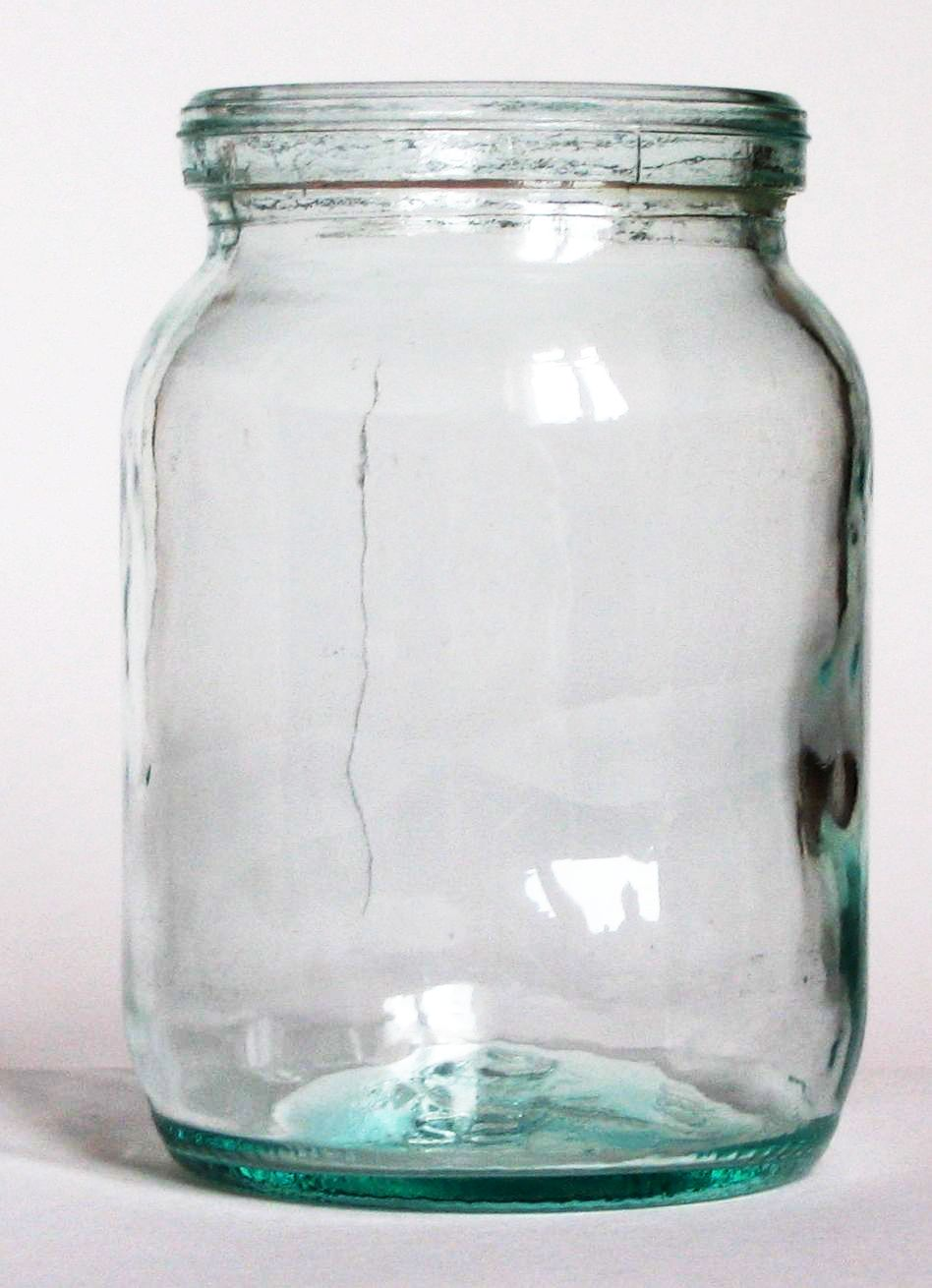
A Soviet mayonnaise jar, made of container glass

Container glass is a type of glass for the production of glass containers, such as bottles, jars, drinkware, and bowls. Container glass stands in contrast to flat glass (used for windows, glass doors, transparent walls, windshields) and glass fiber (used for thermal insulation, in fiberglass composites, and optical communication).

== Composition ==
Container glass has a lower magnesium oxide and sodium oxide content than flat glass, and a higher silica, calcium oxide, and aluminum oxide content. Its higher content of water-insoluble oxides imparts slightly higher chemical durability against water, which is required for storage of beverages and food.

Most container glass is soda-lime glass, produced by blowing and pressing techniques, while some laboratory glassware is made from borosilicate glass.

== Glass containers ==
Container glass is used in the following:

- Glass bottles:
  - Beer bottle
  - Bologna bottle
  - Fiasco
  - Milk bottle
  - Sealed bottles
  - Wine bottles
- Jars
  - Antique fruit jar
  - Killing jar
  - Kilner jar
  - Leyden jar
  - Mason jar
  - Fowler's jar
- Drinkware
- Bowls
- Pitchers
- Vases
- Laboratory glassware

== See also ==
- Glass Packaging Institute
