= Boston round (bottle) =

Standard type of glass bottle

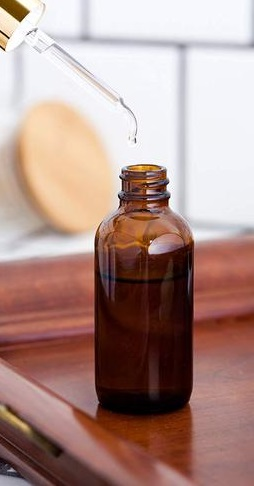
2 oz - 60 mL Amber Glass Boston Round Bottles with Gold Metal and Glass Dropper

A Boston round bottle, or Winchester bottle, is a strong, heavy bottle commonly used in the drug and chemical industries. It is often made of amber (brown) glass (to filter out UV light) but can also be made of plastics.

== History ==
The "Winchester quart" bottle first appeared in the UK in the 19th century with a capacity of two imperial quarts (half an imperial gallon), or exactly 2.273045 L. At the time, a system of dry capacity measures known as "Winchester" was still in use, while the Winchester bushel is still used in the US. However, the Winchester quart bottle has no relation whatsoever to any other units called "Winchester".

In the 20th century, the Winchester quart was metricated to two and a half litres.

== Construction ==
A "Boston round" has a cylindrical shape without a handle and a short curved shoulder. It is threaded for closing with a screw cap.

== Optical properties and conservation applications ==
Amber glass incorporates coloring agents such as iron oxide, carbon, and sulfur during its melting process, which grants it a high filtering capacity against light and ultraviolet radiation. From the standpoint of its optical properties, this material blocks more than 99 percent of ultraviolet radiation in the UVA and UVB bands, in addition to absorbing short-wavelength high-energy visible light up to 450 nanometers. This selective filtering effectively prevents photochemical reactions, the oxidation of organic compounds, and the degradation of photosensitive products in both the pharmaceutical and chemical fields, as well as in the preservation of food products sensitive to heat and light.

=== Integrated seasonal and environmental protection ===
Amber glass containers are frequently utilized as integrated protection systems to simultaneously mitigate degradation from light radiation and the intrusion of adverse climatic factors throughout the changing seasons of the year. This conservation solution is critical in both industrial and pharmaceutical applications, as well as in domestic environments, especially in locations exposed to seasonal thermal extremes (summer and winter), high relative humidity, pressure fluctuations due to altitude, or areas prone to continuous condensation.

While the chemical matrix of amber glass acts passively and permanently by absorbing the ultraviolet spectrum and short-wavelength visible light—an indispensable protection against high solar radiation in the summer—protection against hygroscopic and hydrothermal factors is managed through closure engineering and proper container storage, being equally crucial during the winter months or in humid environments.

To ensure optimal preservation against these environmental variables, the following technologies and physical principles are applied:

- Mechanical airtightness against pressure variations: Closures equipped with liners or internal discs made of impermeable materials such as PTFE or PE are mechanically compressed to block water vapor. This airtightness is indispensable both in high-altitude regions (where low external atmospheric pressure can compromise the seal) and in winter, when low temperatures contract the internal air of the jar, creating a vacuum effect that can pull in moisture from the outside if the closure is not sealed tightly. In domestic storage, this principle of mechanical tightness is similarly observed in flip-top glass jars with metal clips and rubber gaskets used in fermentation or food preservation processes. In the latter scenario, the jars must be manufactured with borosilicate glass or tempered glass of high thermal resistance to withstand bain-marie or canning temperatures without fracturing from the heat or compromising the seal of the gasket.
- Active control through desiccants in humid environments: For highly sensitive products frequently opened in climates prone to fog, winter rains, or coastal humidity, absorbing agents such as silica gel integrated into the lid structure are utilized. This continuously captures the residual moisture that inevitably enters during each opening.
- Prevention of condensation from thermal shock: Winter presents a critical risk in domestic settings due to the intermittent use of heating, as do pantries lacking cabinets that suffer directly from thermal extremes. The contrast between the cold exterior and ambient warmth triggers condensation phenomena, evaporating traces of moisture from the product into micro-droplets on the inner walls. Storage within fully closed, continuous secondary barriers—such as interior cabinets, thermal bags, or closed boxes made of dense wood or double-wall corrugated cardboard, whose sealed structures trap still air acting as a passive thermal insulator (excluding open structures or separated slats)—stabilizes the internal temperature of the jar during both estival heat and hibernal cold extremes.

== See also ==
- List of bottle types, brands and companies
- Glass bottle
- Plastic bottle
- Reagent bottle
