= Miniwaste =

Miniwaste was a European project operated from January 2010 to December 2012, designed to "bring bio-waste back to life". In other words, it was intended to demonstrate that it is possible to significantly reduce the amount of bio-waste at a local level. The project was co-funded by the LIFE+ programme of the European Commission. The project emphasized the efficiency and sustainability of bio-waste reduction actions at source, in particular by organising demonstration actions and trainings for the population, and by offering a better way of evaluating and controlling waste prevention.

== Main goals ==
The project endeavors to demonstrate, in accordance with the recent Waste Framework Directive, that it is possible to significantly reduce the amount of organic waste (also called "bio-waste", covering both food and green waste) at the source in a sustainable way, and to monitor actions for waste reduction in an efficient manner.

The Miniwaste project has four main objectives:

- to gather and share good practices and case studies, which allow to reduce bio-waste and are implemented by European local and regional authorities (for instance, composting);
- to reduce bio-waste in the partner countries (namely France, Portugal and the Czech Republic), by implementing demonstration actions at different scales;
- to develop and implement monitoring procedures, such as a computerised tool, allowing to assess the quality and the quantity of the compost;
- to disseminate the deliverables and results obtained by the partners, in order to provide guidance for European authorities in terms of bio-waste reduction.

== Partners ==
The Miniwaste partners are the local authorities of Rennes Métropole (project leader, France), Brno (Czech Republic) and Lipor (urban area of Porto, Portugal), together with ACR+ (Association of Cities and Regions for Recycling and Sustainable Resource Management) and Cemagref (a French composting research centre). Within the project, the three local authorities will seek, test and disseminate appropriate tools that will allow implementation and monitoring of actions for organic waste reduction on their territories. The project thus presents a way of integrating demonstrative actions at different scales (from pilot actions to large-scale actions) with different European partners.

== Events ==
Apart from setting up a set of communication tools (project website, leaflet, newsletter, final report), two key events will take place in the course of the project:

- A technical workshop, which was held on 12–13 September in Brno (Czech Republic);
- Miniwaste final conference, which will take place on 20–21 November 2012 in Rennes (France).

== Reduction of bio-waste ==
Bio-waste is kitchen waste (raw or cooked food waste) and green waste (garden and park waste). Reducing bio-waste can mainly be obtained by limiting food waste and by practicing collective or individual composting of food and green waste. According to studies, an average European produces between 100 kg and 250 kg of organic waste per year. 10% of this waste can be avoided by limiting food waste and almost 30 to 70% can be composted, including at source.

== See also ==
- European Week for Waste Reduction
- Pre-waste
- Reuse
- Waste hierarchy
- Waste management
- Waste minimisation
