= Growler (jug) =

Bottle used for selling craft beer and other drinks

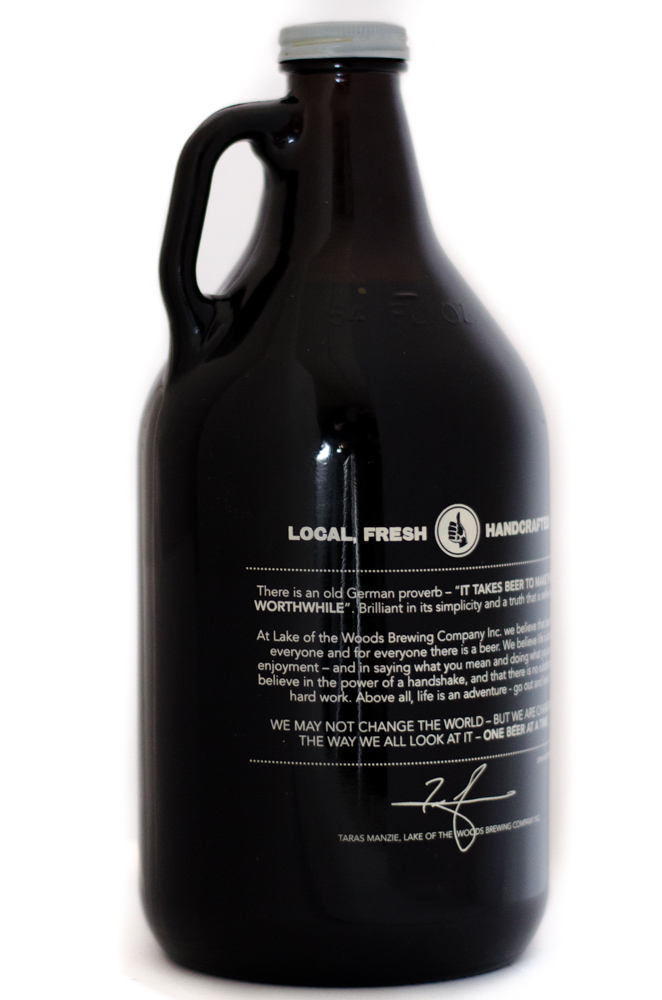
A 64 U.S. fl oz (1,892.7 ml; 66.6 imp fl oz) growler

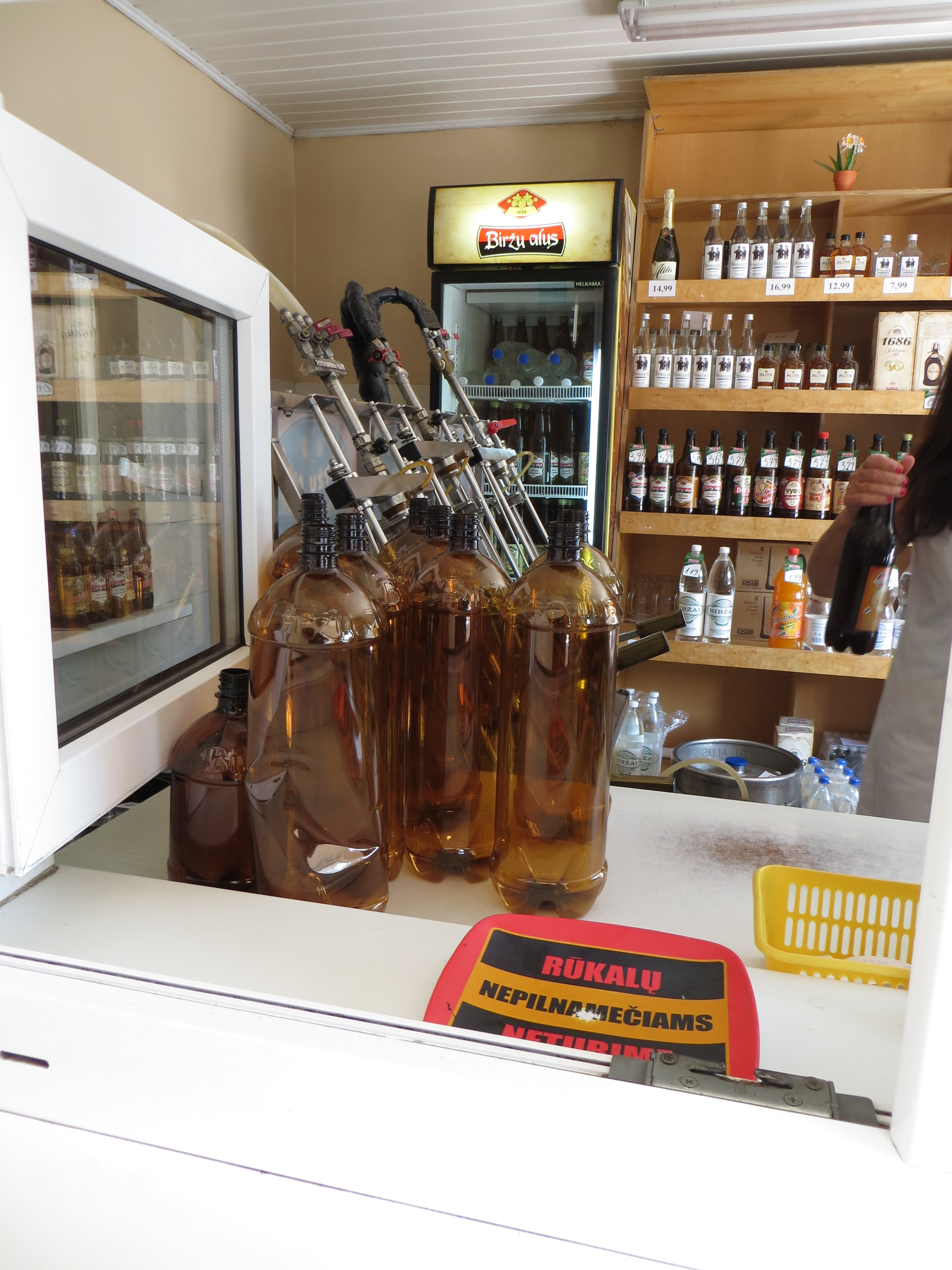
Plastic growlers at a beer shop in Biržai, Lithuania

A growler (US) (/ˈɡraʊlər/) is a glass, ceramic, or stainless steel bottle used to transport draft beer. They are commonly sold at breweries and brewpubs as a means to sell take-out craft beer. Rarely, beers are bottled in growlers for retail sale. The significant growth of craft breweries and the growing popularity of home brewing has also led to an emerging market for the sale of collectible growlers. Some U.S. grocery stores, convenience stores, bars and restaurants have growler filling stations.

A crowler (portmanteau of "canned growler") is a fillable and machine-sealable beer can. The selected beer is poured into the can body and then a pop-top is sealed over it at a canning station. Though not reusable like a growler bottle, a crowler is easier to transport. They are typically a quart (32 US oz/946 mL or 40 imp oz/1136 mL) or litre (33.8 US oz/35.2 imp oz) in size.

== Overview ==
=== Composition ===
Growlers are generally made of glass and have either a screw-on cap or a hinged porcelain gasket cap, which can maintain freshness for a week or more. A properly sealed growler will hold carbonation indefinitely and store beer like any other sanitized bottle. Some growler caps are equipped with valves to allow replacement of carbon dioxide lost while racking. The modern glass growler was first introduced by Charlie and Ernie Otto of Otto Brothers' Brewing Company in Wilson, Wyoming, in 1989.

The two most popular colors for growlers are amber (a brownish hue) or clear (often called "flint"). Clear growlers are often 25% to 35% more per unit than their amber counterparts. Glass handles are the most common type of handle for growlers, although metal handles, with more ornate designs, can also be found. Some growlers do not have handles; this is especially common with growlers smaller than 64 U.S. fl oz that have Grolsch-style flip-tops.

=== Use ===
Growlers can be refilled for between $5 and $30 in the United States. Their initial purchase can carry a significant (sometimes non-compulsory) deposit. In Hanoi, the Habeco Beer Hanoi company stores, Bia Ơi, charges a 100,000 VNĐ deposit for both one and two liter stainless steel bia hơi growlers. Instead of being refilled, the growlers are exchanged for prefilled chilled ones.

== Sizes ==
While 64 U.S. fl oz (1,892.7 ml; 66.6 imp fl oz) is the most popular growler size, growlers are commonly found in 32 U.S. fl oz (1 US Quart, sometimes known as a "howler", which may be short for "half growler"), 128 U.S. fl oz (1 US Gallon), 1-liter (33.8 U.S. fl oz; 35.2 imp fl oz), and 2-liter sizes as well.

== Etymology ==
The term may date from the late 19th century when fresh beer was carried from the local pub to one's home by means of a small galvanized bucket. It is claimed the sound that the carbon dioxide made when it escaped from the lid as the beer sloshed around sounded like a growl.

== See also ==
- Beer bottle
- Glass bottle
- Glass production
- List of bottle types, brands and companies
- Wine bottle
- Jug wine
