= European Week for Waste Reduction =

The European Week for Waste Reduction (EWWR) was launched as a 3-year project supported by the LIFE+ Programme of the European Commission until July 2012. It continues taking place in the following years. The 2012 edition of the EWWR took place from 17 to 25 November 2012 under the patronage of Mr Janez Potočnik, European Commissioner for the Environment. It aims to organize multiple actions during a single week, across Europe, that will raise awareness about waste reduction. Each year, the most outstanding actions are rewarded during an awards ceremony in Brussels at the heart of the European institutions. Since the beginning of the project, more than 20.000 awareness raising actions on waste prevention have been implemented in the framework of the EWWR.

The 2017 date is from 18 to 27 November.

The five partners of this project are:

- ADEME (the French Environment and Energy Management Agency – project coordinator)
- ACR+ (the Association of Cities and Regions for Recycling and sustainable Resource management – project technical secretariat)
- ARC (the Catalan Waste Agency)
- IBGE (Brussels Environment, public administration for the environment and energy) and
- LIPOR (the Intermunicipal Waste Management Service of Greater Porto).

== See also ==
- Waste minimisation
- Reuse
- Waste hierarchy
- Waste management
- Miniwaste
- Pre-waste
