= Bologna bottle =

Type of glass bottle used as scientific and magic apparatus

A Bologna bottle, also known as a Bologna phial or philosophical vial, is a glass bottle which has great external strength, often used in physics demonstrations and magic tricks. The exterior is generally strong enough that one could pound a nail into a block of wood using the bottle as a hammer; however, even a small scratch on the interior would cause it to crumble.

It is created by heating a glass bottle and then rapidly cooling the outside whilst slowly cooling the inside. This causes external compression and internal tension such that even a scratch on the inside is sufficient to shatter the bottle.

The effect is utilized in several magic effects, including the "Devil's Flask".

== Manufacture ==
To create the desired effect, the bottles are rapidly cooled on the outside and slow cooled on the inside during the glass-making process. This causes there to be compressive stress on the outside of the bottle and tensile stress on the inside, making the inside surface susceptible to damage which can release the internal stresses and shatter the bottle. The glass is not annealed. Reheating the glass and then allowing it to cool slowly will remove the unique properties from the glass.

== Uses ==
Because of the seemingly paradoxical nature of the glass (being both extremely durable and extremely fragile), Bologna bottles are often used as props in magic tricks, where the bottle can be shattered by rattling a small object inside it. Due to its susceptibility to catastrophic failure from the inside, it is not practically useful as a container.

== History ==
Mentioned in the publication of the Royal Society around the 1740s, the Bologna bottle is named for where it was first discovered in Bologna, Italy. During this period, a glassblower would create a Bologna bottle by leaving the bottle in the open air instead of immediately placing the bottle back into the furnace to cool slowly and evenly. This produced a special phenomenon, where the bottle would remain intact even when dropped from a distance onto the brick floor, but would immediately rupture if a small piece of flint were placed inside.

== See also ==
- List of bottle types, brands and companies
- Prince Rupert's drop
- Tempered glass
