= Bottle glorifier =

Display designed to fit on a bottle

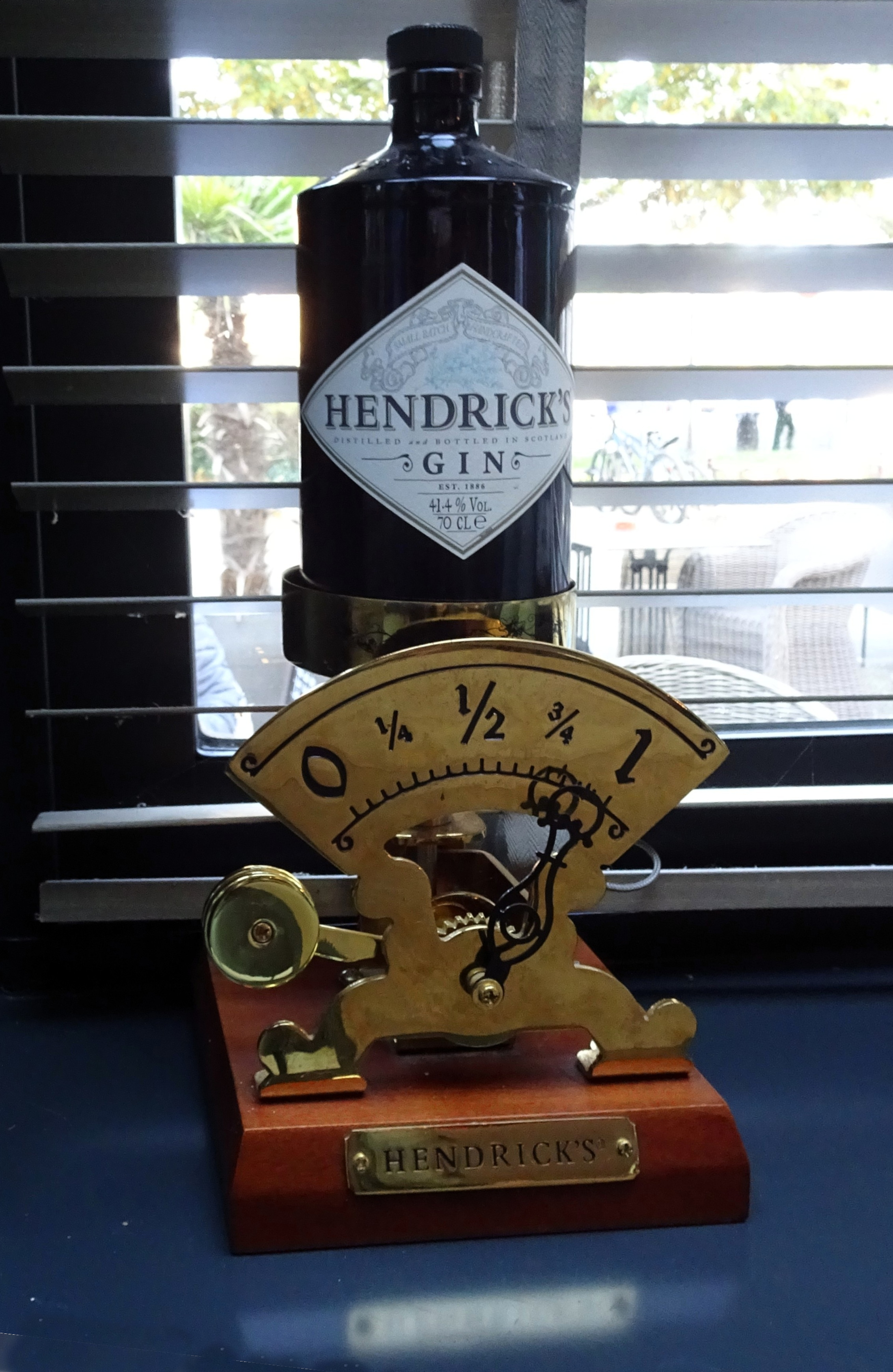
Hendricks Gin Glorifier with Bottle Display with Antique Scales

A bottle glorifier is a display that is designed to fit on a bottle, such as a perfume bottle or a bottle of liqueur, typically with a cut-out area to hold the bottle in position.

Bottle glorifiers can be made of acrylic, wood, stainless steel, plastic, or polyresin. New lighting technology brings LED and electroluminescent illumination options to the display. Most bottle glorifiers are illuminated with LED or fluorescent lighting elements. The units can be powered via AC current or by using DC (batteries) although batteries have a short shelf life when illuminating bottle glorifiers. Other options such as rechargeable batteries are available.

Bottle glorifiers are used for all sorts of marketing expressions. A bottle glorifier for a perfume may be lit emphasize the bottle's shape or color, and to make a larger visual impact around a very small package. A bottle glorifier for a whisky might be shaped to remind shoppers of a barrel. In a dark space such as a nightclub, glorifiers with lights can call attention to the bar's featured offerings.
