= Fish-booking =

Pre-ordering delivery of fish

Fish-booking is the process of pre-ordering delivery of freshly caught, unfrozen fish, crustaceans and mollusks of ocean, sea or river origin directly from the fishermen, fisheries using a specialized service aggregator or directly. Fish-booking is adherent to zero waste concept aimed at the reduction and minimization of waste in the areas, where it is possible.

Pre-ordering fish through fish-booking enables consumers to ‘book’ the exact amount of product they intend to consume directly from the fisherman, without wasting resources on the part of the catch that will turn into trash. These kinds of services are popular in the countries with their own access to sea / ocean and relatively short delivery distances. The services providing quick delivery of fresh fish over long distances requiring air travel are also being developed. In addition, the so-called “subscription” services for the delivery of fish with a certain regularity, also allowing to plan the harvest and ensure prudent use of natural resource are gaining a widespread use.

== Reduction of harvested fish losses ==
According to The State of World Fisheries and Aquaculture 2020 published by the Food and Agriculture Organization of the United Nations, 35% of the global harvest, caught or grown for the needs of the consumers, are lost or wasted during transportation and processing, or as leftover stock at the wholesale warehouse and retail stores. This amounted to around 62 million tons of the total fisheries and aquaculture production (179 million tons) in 2018. Also, fish and fishery products are the first to be thrown out from the fridge by end consumers, if they get spoiled. It is an additional loss ranging from 5% (China) to 30% (United States) in different regions of the world at consumer level.

Fish-booking helps eliminate these unnecessary losses through direct contracts with the fishermen or fisheries and pre-planned orders. The examples of companies operating based on fish-booking principle (delivery of pre-ordered fish directly off the boat to the consumer) within one country: Cameron's Seafood Market, United States, The Cornish Fishmonger and Just Caught, UK, Poiscaille, France, Seadora in Ukraine etc.

== Stages of fish-booking ==
=== For consumer ===
- The customer chooses fish / seafood from the selection on the website of the aggregator company or on the app of the fisherman or group of fishermen (by country, date of the next harvest, etc.)
- Two-three days after the date of the harvest, the consumer receives direct delivery of the ordered fish.

=== For aggregator company ===
- The aggregator company collects orders from consumers and forms a wholesale catch order, sending it to a specific fisherman / fishery.
- The fisherman / fishery plans the harvest and catches the required amount as per the aggregator's order (factually the order of specific end consumers).
- Foregoing auctions, port buyers, wholesale warehouses and other intermediaries, the fisherman / fishery delivers the catch to the representative of the aggregator company. Purchasing fish at the fishermen's markets at ports is not considered fish-booking, as the fish was harvested without the pre-order from consumers.
- The aggregator company arranges logistics chain of delivery (including customs clearance) of fish from the fisherman to the warehouse in the distribution country, where the wholesale order is distributed and sorted.
- The courier of the aggregator company delivers the pre-paid orders directly to the consumers.

== Technological prospects of fish-booking ==
- The aggregator companies provide an opportunity to trace the fish in real time mode from the moment of the catch up to the delivery to the door using the apps and smart tags on each fish.
- It is possible that the apps will be developed to allow the consumer to “book” the fish directly from the fisherman at sea (Uber principle), communicate with him, give ratings, send complaints or appreciation posts for the fish, etc.
- There are subscription services already available in the world for regular (monthly, weekly) deliveries of fish of specific or different types from one or different fishermen, for example the French Poiscaille, My Fishman in Malaysia, Fish Box in the UK, etc.).
- Joint purchase services that allow residents of one community or area to purchase fish cheaper due to larger volumes are being developed (Buyers Club of Lummi Island Wild in the USA).
- Protection of the delivery chain from the vessel to the consumer using blockchain technology is gaining popularity. Digital information on the movement of fish cannot be falsified at any stage. In particular, such technology is being implemented by the Australian company Two Hands for lobster suppliers.
