= Pullapart =

Packaging recycling classification system

PullApart was a UK-based, independent packaging recycling classification system. Applied at the kerbside, it combined environmental and consumer packaging surveys to provide customers with a measurement of the ease with which specific types of packaging could be locally recycled. The process was invented by Michael Butler of Dawlish in 2005, and operated for free.

== Methodology ==
As PullApart was applied to existing local authority-installed recycling bin refuse collection systems, its scoring scheme was dependent on individual local authorities’ own packaging disassembly practices. Sample packaging was disassembled, according to the Local Authority’s process, rearranged and its components graded for ease of recycling. The raw information from this exercise was also made available to the public.

A final, consumer-oriented "PAC" (PullApart Code) score was achieved by measuring what proportion of a product's components was recyclable from the kerbside. The PAC score is represented by 13 stages of ‘traffic light’ grading.

== Broader aims ==
PullApart’s stated aims are to encourage, manufactures, retailers, food and agricultural producers to improve ease of disposal and recycling in their packaging designs. They aim to provide consumers with information enabling product choice (ethical consumerism), that's easy, local and kerbside recyclable, and assist in the optimisation of products for the goal of near Zero waste.

According to PullApart’s then current Teignbridge (2011) survey of over 2000 products, 2.84% were ideally suited for kerbside recycling and a further 29.32% were good, whilst the rest failed. The sample area, Teignbridge, and therefore Teignbridge District Council, had a current recycling rate of 57% (2008/2009), (by weight). Quoting from their periodical, “Teignbridge Life” explaining to local people how PullApart worked: “The online packaging recycling guide features a free search function which classifies ordinary consumer products, like cereal boxes, with a 'PullApart' rating. The rating breaks the product down into its components, explaining which parts can be recycled in Teignbridge.”

=== Scoring system ===
A simplified mathematical representation of PullApart's kerbside scoring system for determining local recyclability only, by weight:

A packaging's non-recyclable is divided by its recyclable. If <= 1 then it is considered "good"; if > 1 it is "bad".
The nearer to zero it is, the better; the greater above 1, the worse.

Weight is not the only consideration, there are others including volume, therefore the analysis is more complex than the above.

From a local consumer's perspective, the combined effectiveness of both packaging and their local kerbside recycling is simply determined by:

The percentage of easy “green” packaging (taken from PullApart's 2011 survey), divided by the number of kerbside collection bins and bags.

For Teignbridge areas A and B in 2001 this was 8.04 (32.16% / 4), and for their communal area C it was 5.36 (32.16% / 6). These scores are out of a maximum of 100 (for frictionless “green” kerbside packaging into just one collection bin or bag).

== Awards for the scheme ==
PullApart is considered to be of “Environmental Best Practice” by The Green Organisation.

== Comparison with other efforts ==
Worldwide there are broader packaging scoring systems that address the full environmental impact of packaging. Recycling being one factor, other vital considerations include the use of recycled materials in the package, avoidance of toxic substances, minimization of packaging, effects on atmosphere (greenhouse gas, VOC, etc.), use of renewable resources, etc. Efforts involve methodologies such as life cycle assessment to inventory the all environmental impacts and factors. There are many Sustainability metrics and indices, some specifically for packaging.

== See also ==
- Packaging
- Sustainable packaging
