= Waste exchange =

Waste exchange is where the waste product of one process becomes the raw materials for a second process. This is similar to using pre-consumer recycling material in a product. This represents a way of reducing waste disposal through reuse for that which cannot be eliminated. In this way waste exchange practices are high on the waste hierarchy.

There are free online services for businesses and other organisations that help to keep reusable items in circulation and out of landfill.

== See also ==
- Global waste trade
