= Sipper water bottle =

Water bottle for small animals

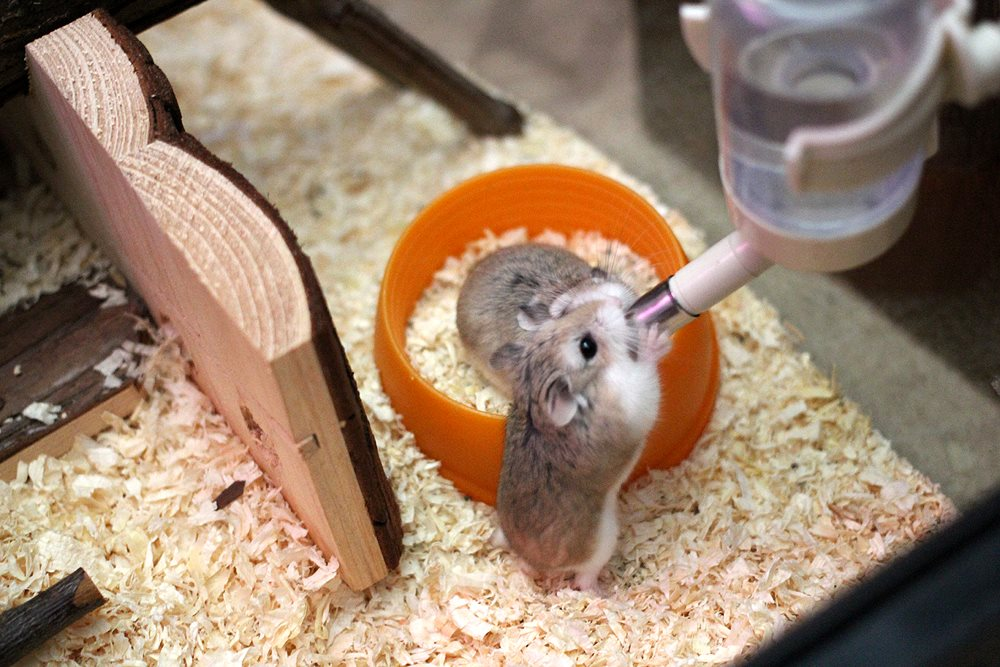
A hamster drinking from a sipper water bottle

A sipper water bottle is a type of bottle used to dispense water for certain pets including rabbits, ferrets, hamsters, chinchillas, gerbils, and other small animals. Typically a sipper bottle consists of a plastic portion used to contain the water, a plastic cap, and a metal tube with a ball bearing inside.

The vacuum formed by the presence of the ball bearing keeps water from flowing out of the bottle. An animal can interrupt this vacuum by pressing against the ball bearing and forcing it slightly up the tube—thus an animal can drink from the bottle by licking the metal ball bearing.

A water bottle can be affixed to the side of an animal's cage from the outside (using the wire that normally comes with the bottle) or from the inside (using a separate water bottle holder utilizing a suction cup or a metal support, both of which can be purchased at most pet stores).
