= Weighing bottle =

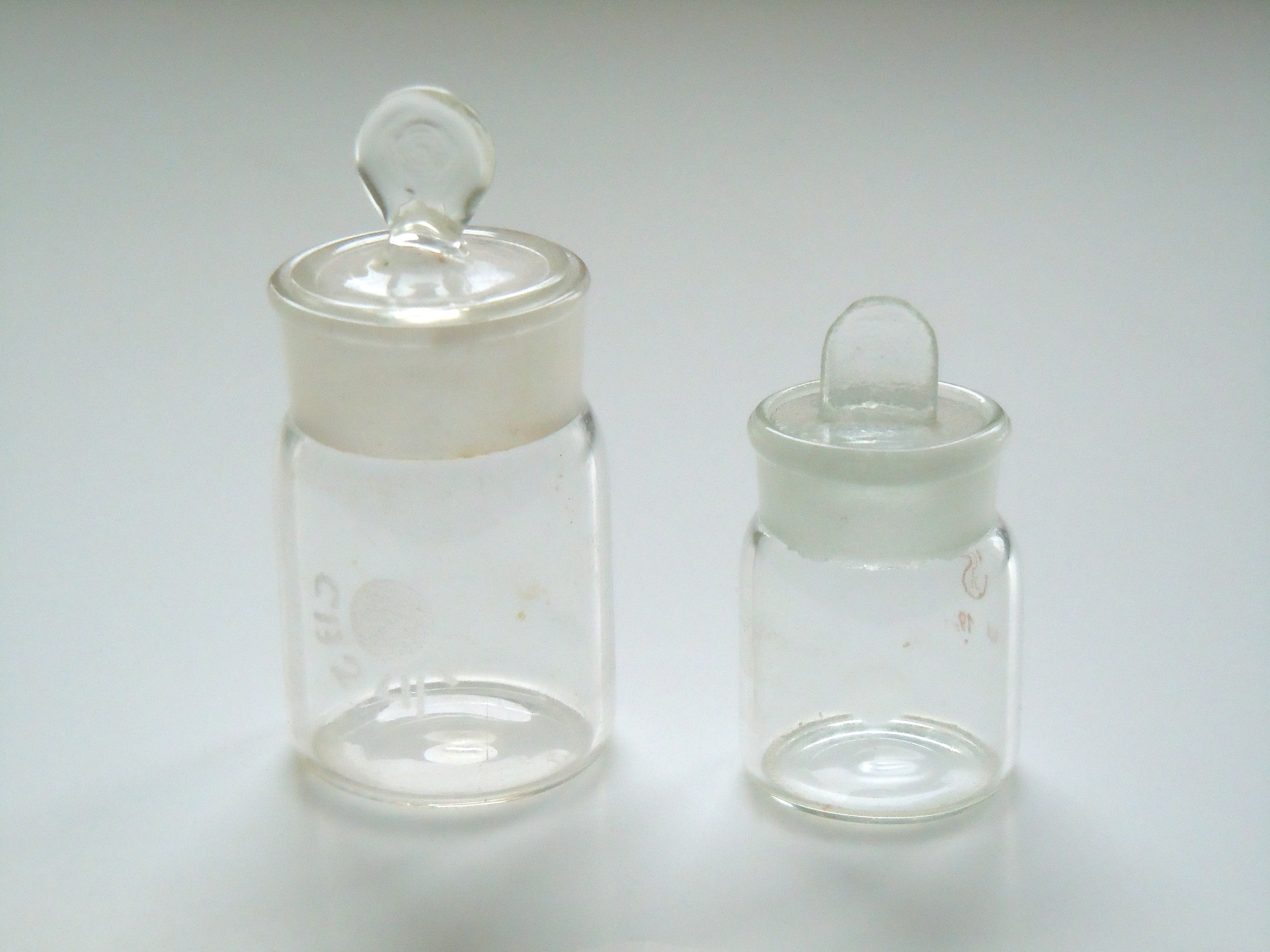
A couple of weighing bottles

Weighing bottles are glass laboratory equipment used for precise weighing of solids.

Most of the glass used in the bottles is thin and fragile glass, but sometimes they are also made of ceramics or plastics.

Dishes tend to have many different shapes. The three most popular are:

- Flat glass dish, which is equipped with a ground cover. In the case of a bowl in which the weighed substances are hygroscopic and decomposed when exposed to moisture or in contact with air, the sample is bottled in an atmosphere of nitrogen, and then weighed in the sealed glass container.
- Flat boat dish is an oblong, flat-bottomed dish, in which it is easy to weigh out the substance, and then move it the reaction chamber, but is not recommended for hygroscopic or air-reactive samples.
- A tall-shaped dish - it is elongated, oblong, flat-bottomed dish, used when the solid is transferred without a funnel.

Other types

- Weighing bottles with interchangeable caps, joints ST 14/21, 19/12, 29/12, 34/12, 40/12, 50/12 and 80/12 in versions tall, medium and low form.
- Weighing bottles with knob on interchangeable ground cover, low form, height x diameter 25 x 25, 30 x 35, 25 x 40, 30 x 50, 30 x 60 änd 30 x 80 mm.
- as above, tall form, height x diameter 40 x 25, 50 x 30, 50 x 40, 65 x 40, 70 x 35 and 80 x 50 mm.
