= Sealed bottles =

Type of bottle

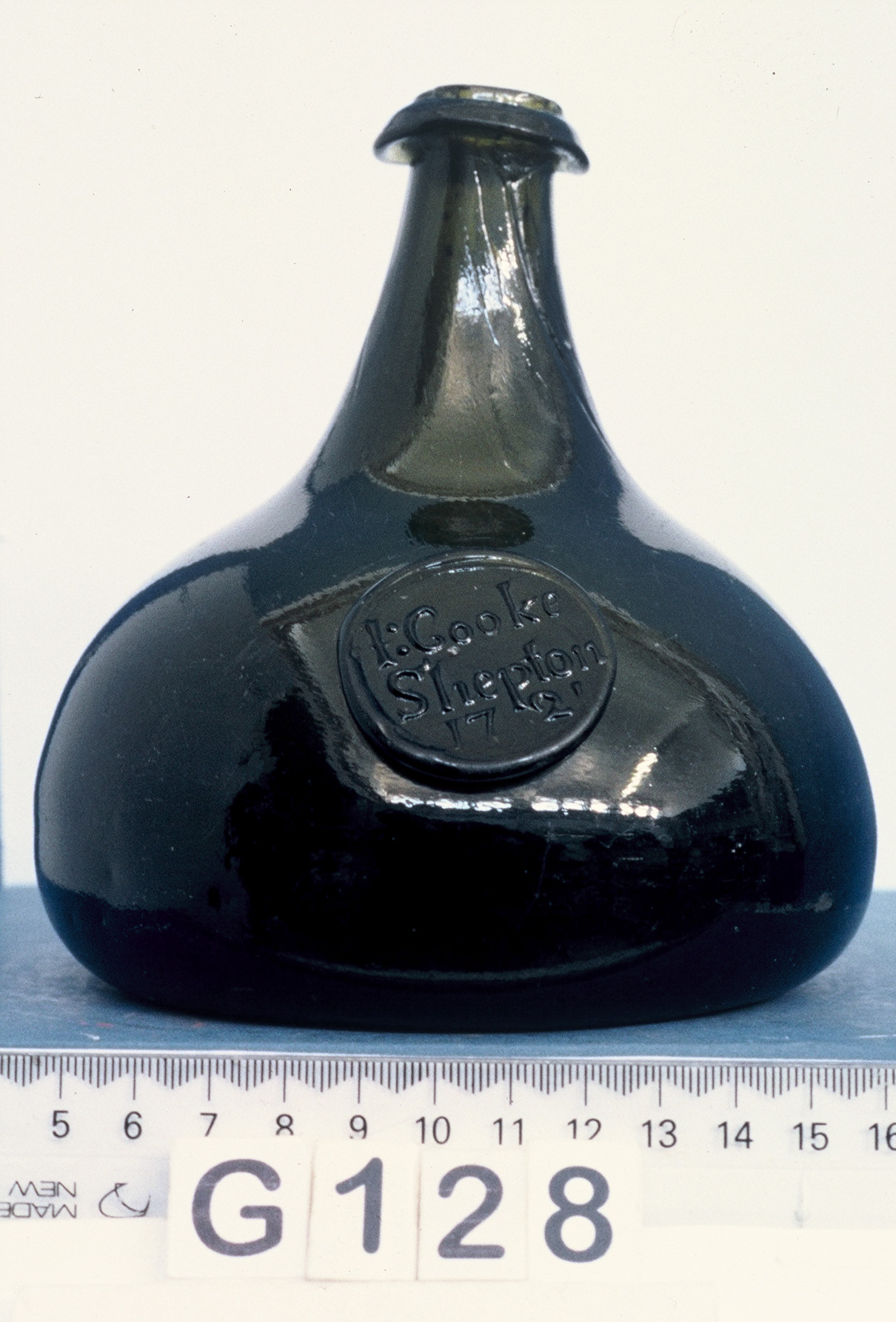
Onion bottle with a seal that reads, "I Cooke Shepton 1721"

Sealed bottles have an applied glass seal on the shoulder or side of the bottle. The seal is a molten blob of glass that has been stamped with an embossed symbol, name or initials, and often it included a date. Collectors of bottles sometimes refer to them as Applied seals, Blob seals or Prunt seals.

Up until the 17th century bottles would have been made of pottery or leather but by the middle of the century a 'new' black/dark green glass wine bottle came into general use. Early glass bottles were squat, broad and rounded sometimes referred to as "onion bottles".

Around 1636 English law prohibited the sale of wine by the 'bottle' in England, according to Jancis Robinson's Oxford Encyclopedia of Wine. Individuals were encouraged to have private bottles made carrying their own seals which they then took to a wine merchant who filled them with wine from a cask using a liquid measure.
