= Bottle cutting =

Bottle cutting is an activity in which a person cuts a bottle using one of a number of techniques to create a new product. Techniques can include sawing or using a hot wire. Around the late 1950s and early 1960s, some restaurants began making glasses by cutting wine bottles. In the late 1960s and early 1970s, bottle-cutting kits began to appear on the market. By 1972, the technique had "caught on like wildfire" and was later described as a fad of the previous decade in 1983. The final step in bottle cutting is polishing, because no matter how carefully one cuts a bottle, the edges will be rough.
