= Glass onion (disambiguation) =

A glass onion is a shape of bottle developed in the 17th century.

The term may also refer to:

- "Glass Onion" (song), a 1968 song by the Beatles.
- Glass Onion: A Knives Out Mystery, a 2022 film by Rian Johnson
  - Glass Onion: A Knives Out Mystery (soundtrack), the soundtrack to the film
