= Glass bottle =

Narrow-necked container

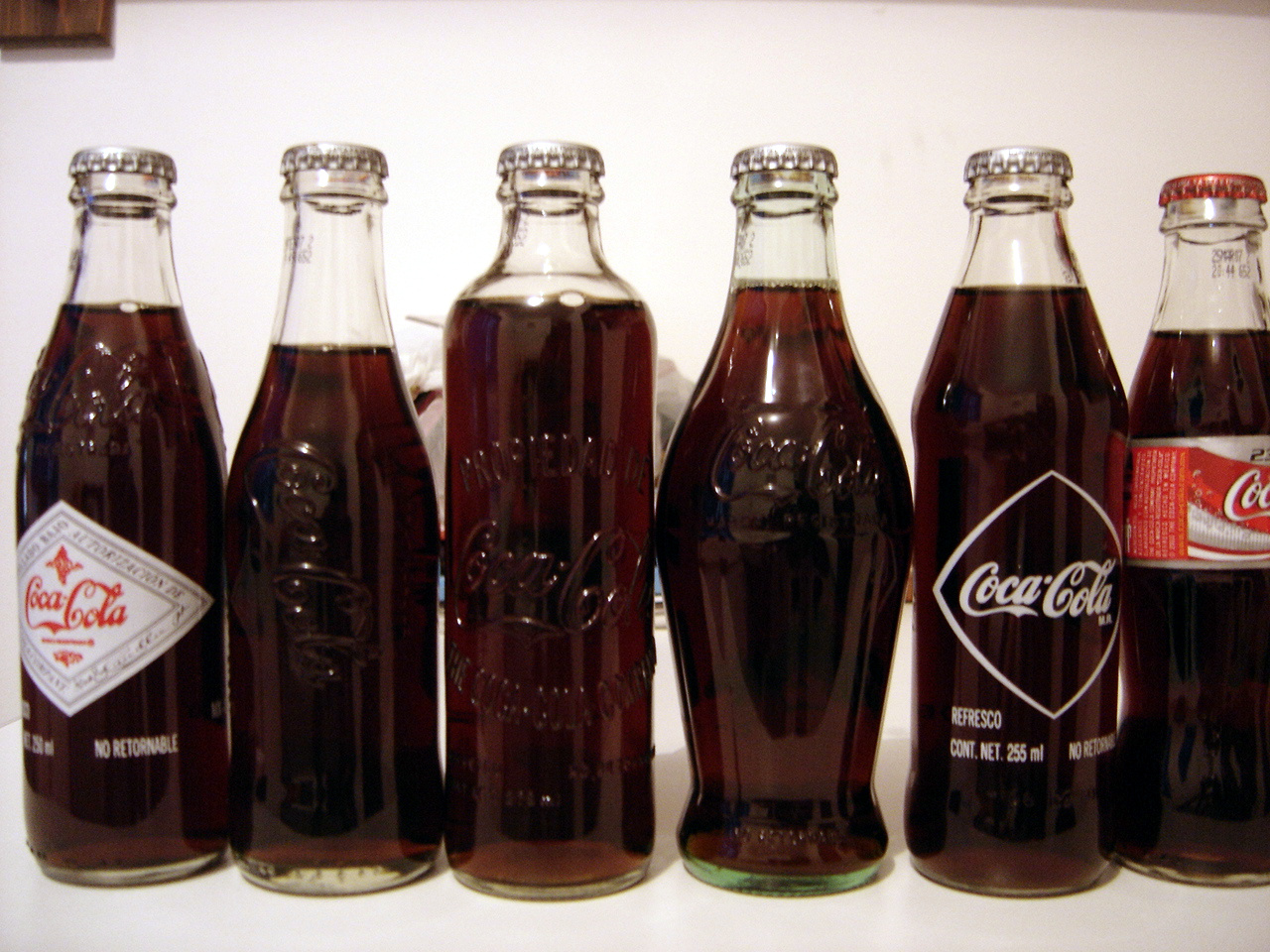
Various vintage Coca-Cola bottles

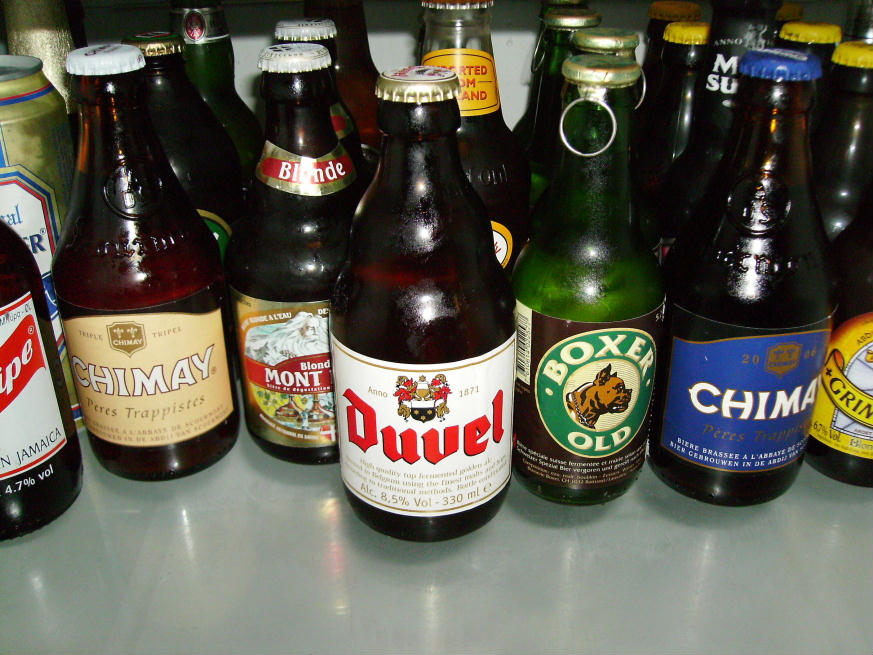
Various beer bottles

Common uses for bottles made from glass include food condiments, soda, liquor, cosmetics, pickling and preservatives; they are occasionally also notably used for the informal distribution of notes. A glass bottle can vary in size considerably, but are most commonly found in sizes ranging between about 200 millilitres and 1.5 litres.

== History ==
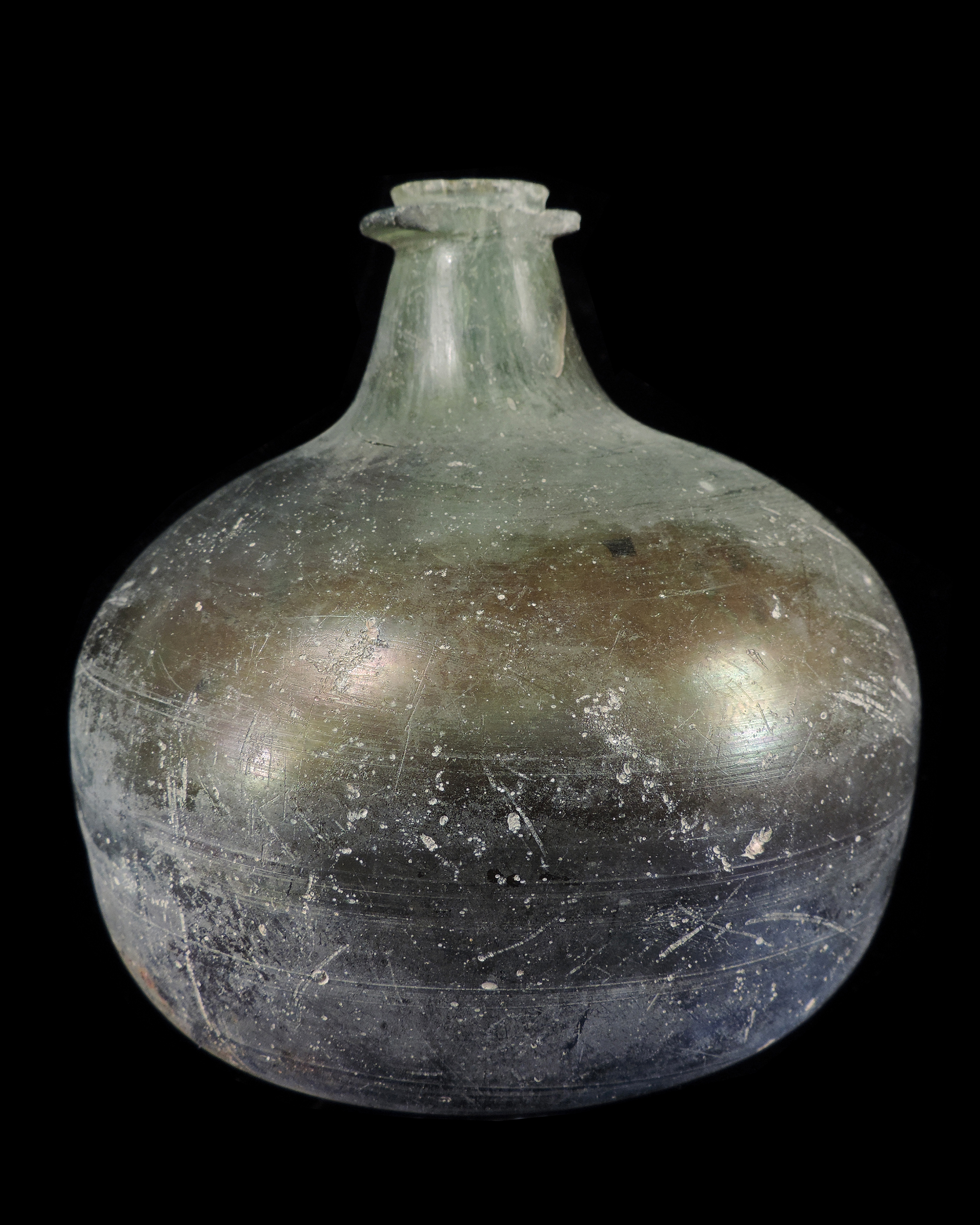
A post-medieval Glass onion bottle dating from 1690 to 1700, found in England circa 2018

Glass bottles and glass jars are found in many households worldwide. The first glass bottles were produced in Mesopotamia around 1500 B.C., and in the Roman Empire in around 1 AD. America's glass bottle and glass jar industry was born in the early 1600s, when settlers in Jamestown built the first glass melting furnace. The invention of the automatic glass bottle-blowing machine in 1903 industrialized the process of making bottles.

== Manufacture ==
The earliest bottles or vessels were made by ancient man. Ingredients were melted to make glass and then clay forms were dipped into the molten liquid. When the glass cooled off, the clay was chipped out of the inside leaving just the hollow glass vessel. This glass was very thin as the fire was not as hot as modern-day furnaces. The blowpipe was invented around 1 B.C. This allowed molten glass to be gathered on the end of the blow pipe and blown into the other end to create a hollow vessel. Eventually, the use of a mould was introduced, followed by the invention of a semi-automatic machine, called the Press and Blow, by Yorkshire Iron founder, Howard Matravers Ashley, in 1886. In 1904, Michael Owens invented the automatic bottle machine, after working on the production of electric lightbulbs, in Ohio, for Edison. The manufacturing cost and minimum order quantity (MOQ) of custom glass bottles are heavily dependent on the complexity of the cast-iron IS machine molds and the purity of the silica sand used, particularly when producing extra flint glass for premium spirits.

Once made, bottles may suffer from internal stresses as a result of unequal, or too rapid cooling. An annealing oven, or 'lehr', is used to cool glass containers slowly to prevent stress and make the bottle stronger. When a glass bottle filled with liquid is dropped or subjected to shock, the water hammer effect may cause hydrodynamic stress, breaking the bottle.

== Characteristics ==
=== Markings ===
Modern bottles, when moulded, are given marks on the heel (bottom). These marks serve a variety of purposes, such as identifying the machine used in the production of the bottle (for quality control purposes), showing the manufacturer of the bottle, how much to fill the bottle to, the date the bottle was manufactured, as well as other information. Embossing on a bottle consists of raised lettering, numbers, and/or designs which were intended to inform the purchaser in some way of the contents or to establish ownership of the bottle.

=== Closures ===
Glass bottles have a variety of closures to seal up the bottle and prevent the contents from escaping. Early bottles were sealed with wax, and later stoppered with a cork. More common today are screw caps and stoppers.

== Disposal ==
Glass recycling recovers a high rate of raw materials. Some countries have adopted container-deposit legislation to encourage recycling.

== Examples ==
Common shapes in modern commerce include:

- Boston round or Winchester bottles - cylinder with heavily rounded top and bottom; thick glass, typically clear, blue, or amber. Common in medical and scientific applications.
- Long-necked or Woozy bottles - tall cylinder with a prominent neck, many of which are used as beer bottles
- Wine bottle - very standard shape, mostly cylindrical but gradually narrowing into the neck
- Spice bottles
- Liquor bottles
- Olive oil bottles - tall and relatively thin with a prominent neck. Marasca bottles are rectangular cuboids on the bottom and rounded on top; Dorica bottles are cylinders.
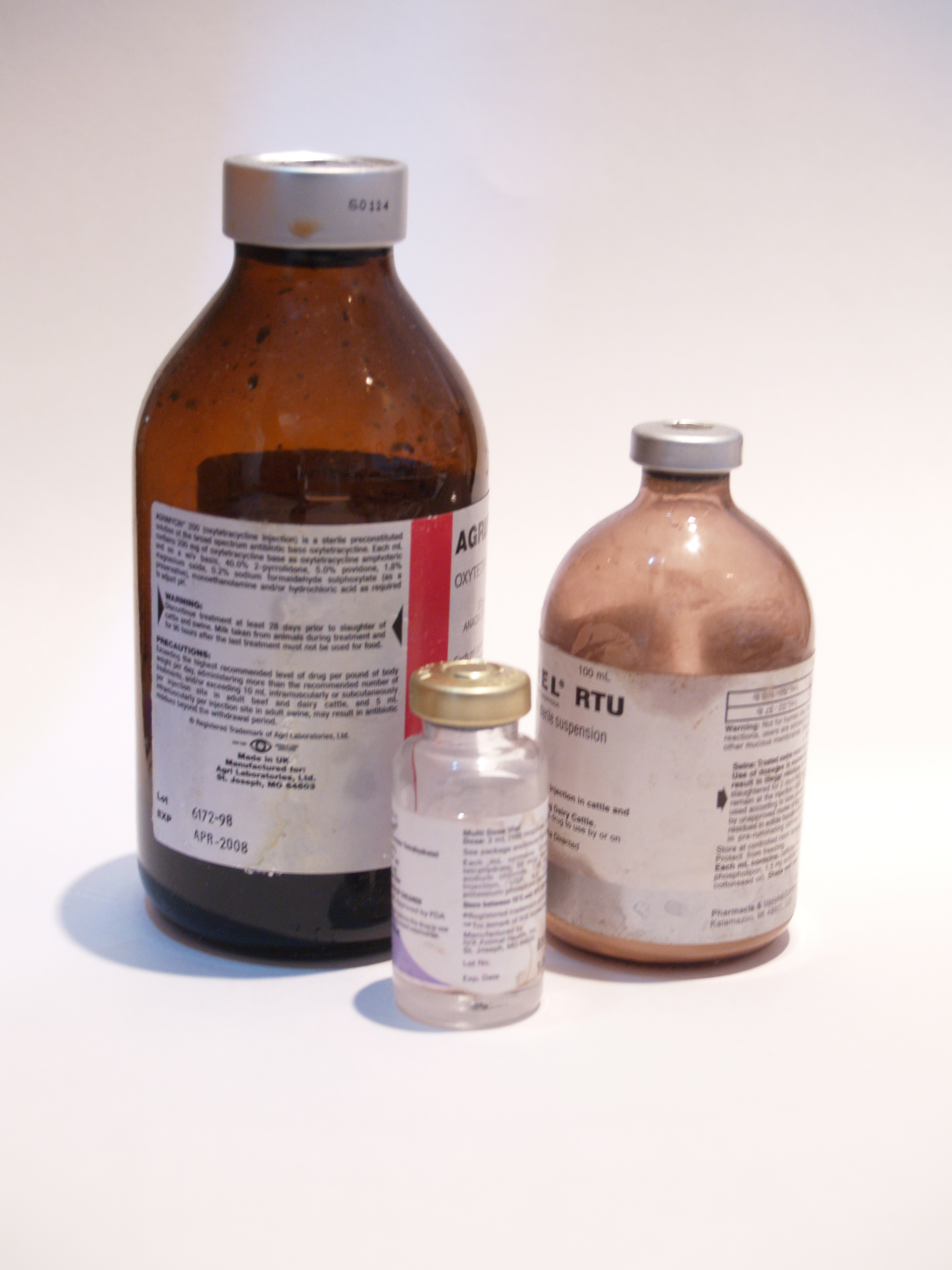
Pharmaceutical supplies

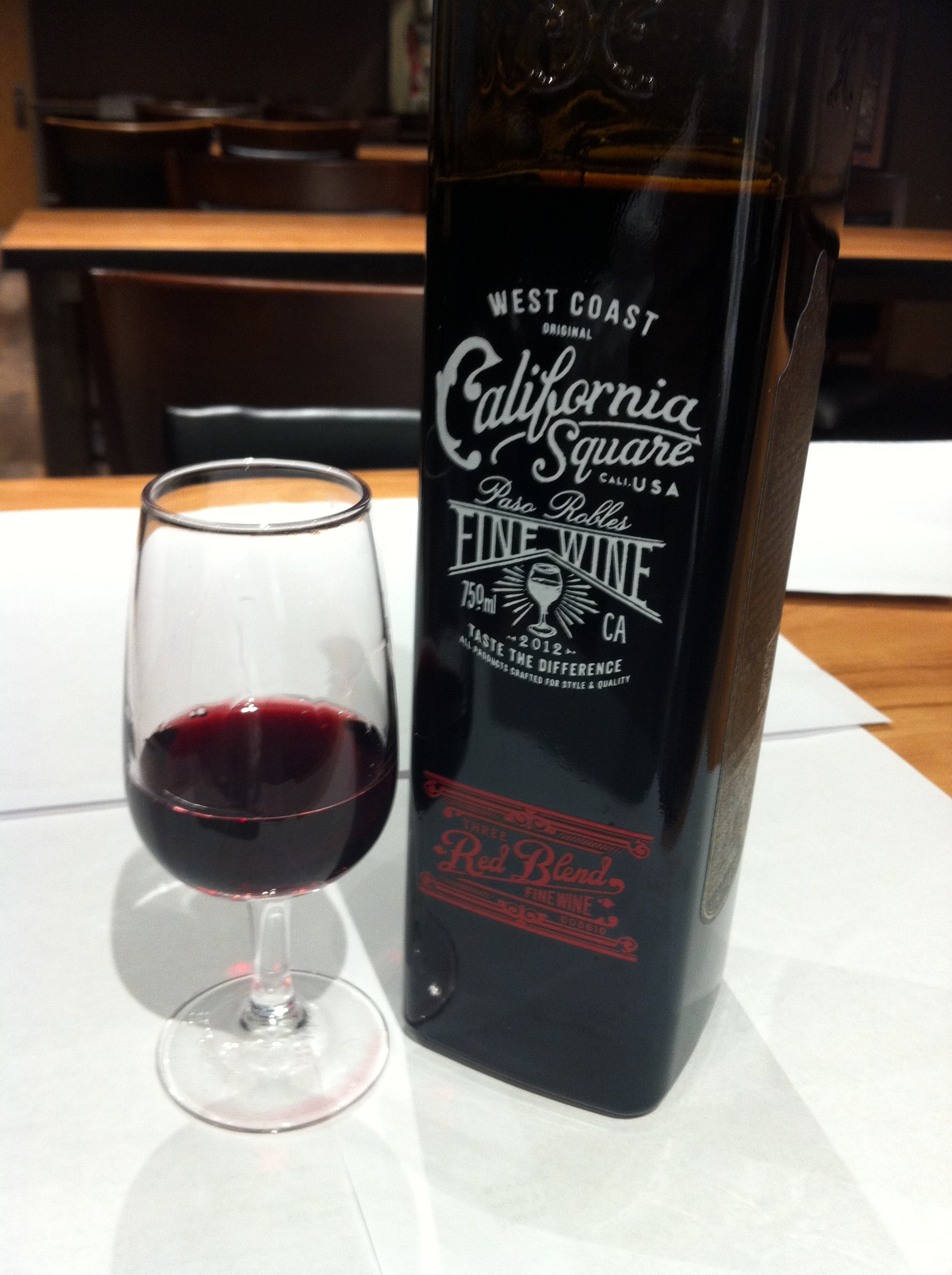
Square wine bottle

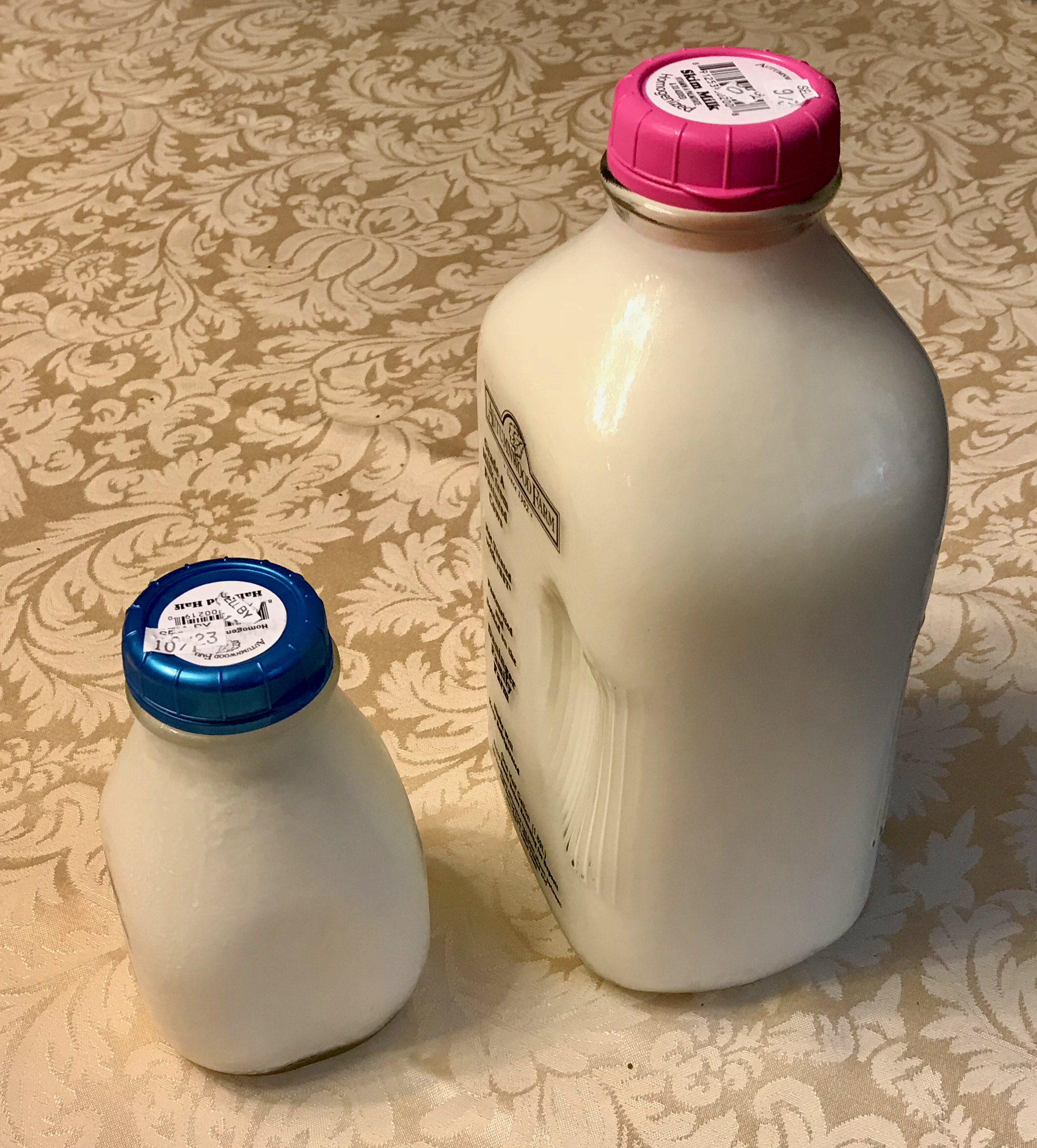
US pint and gallon returnable glass bottles

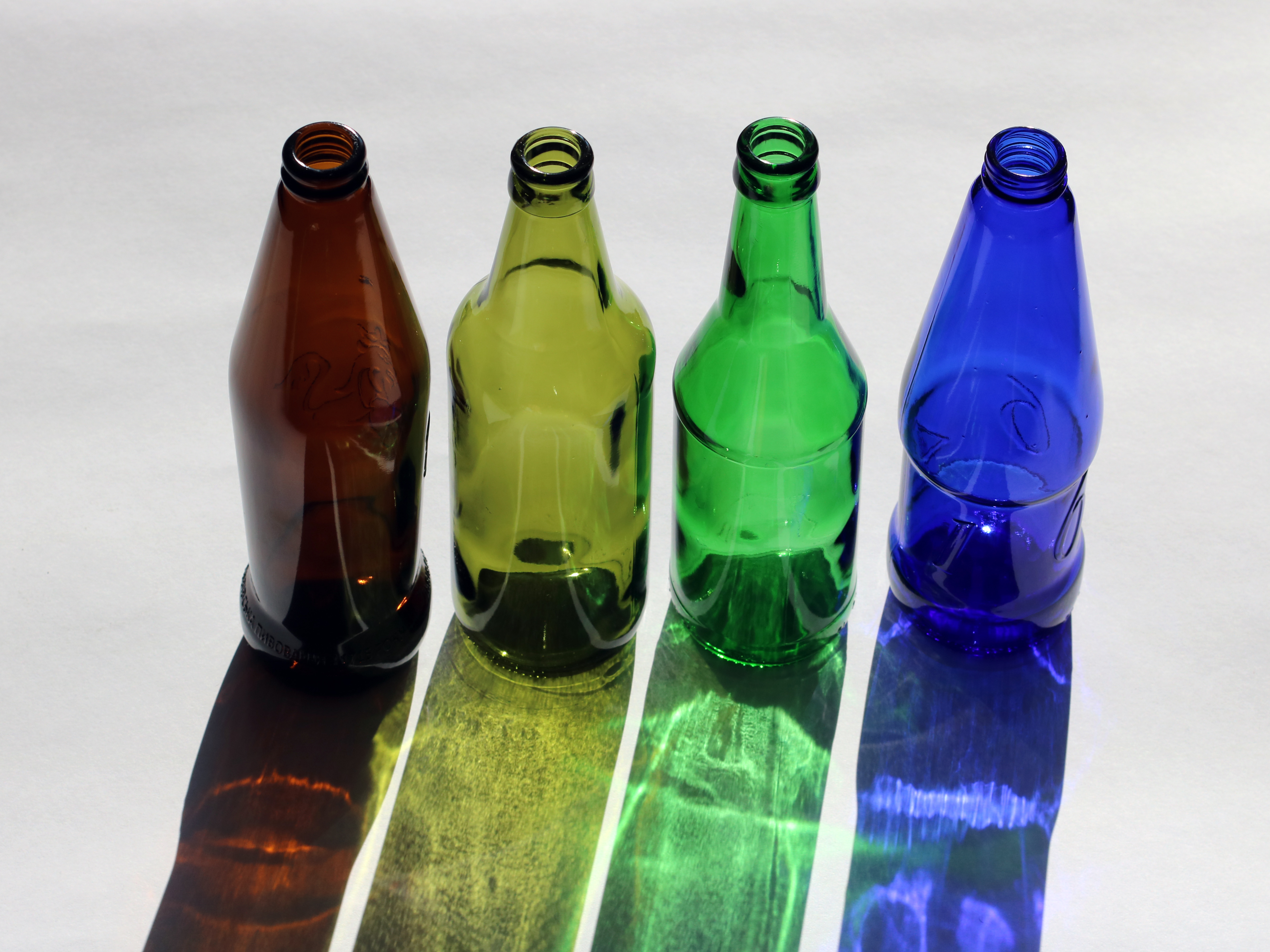
Colors

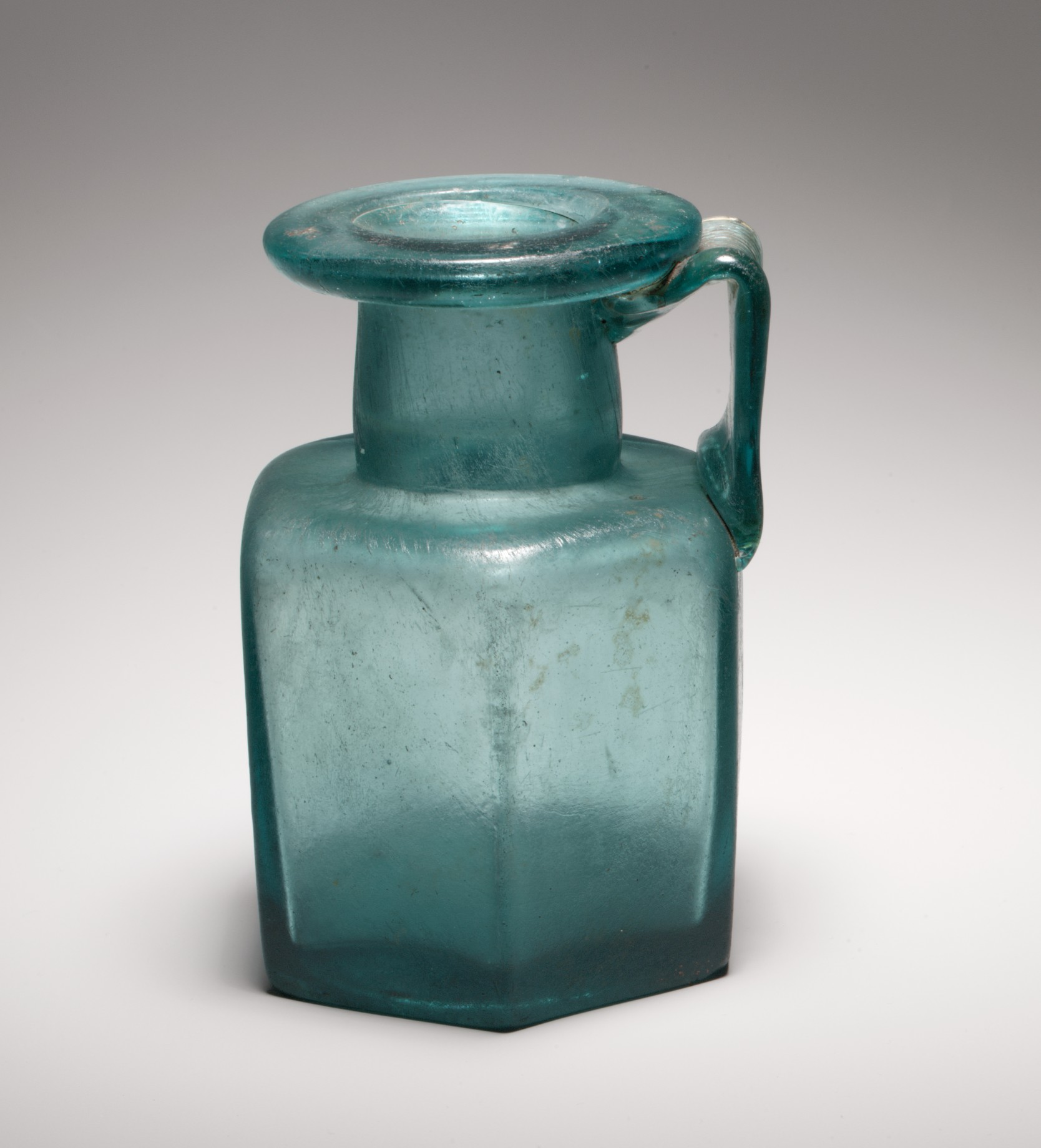
Roman hexagonal bottle

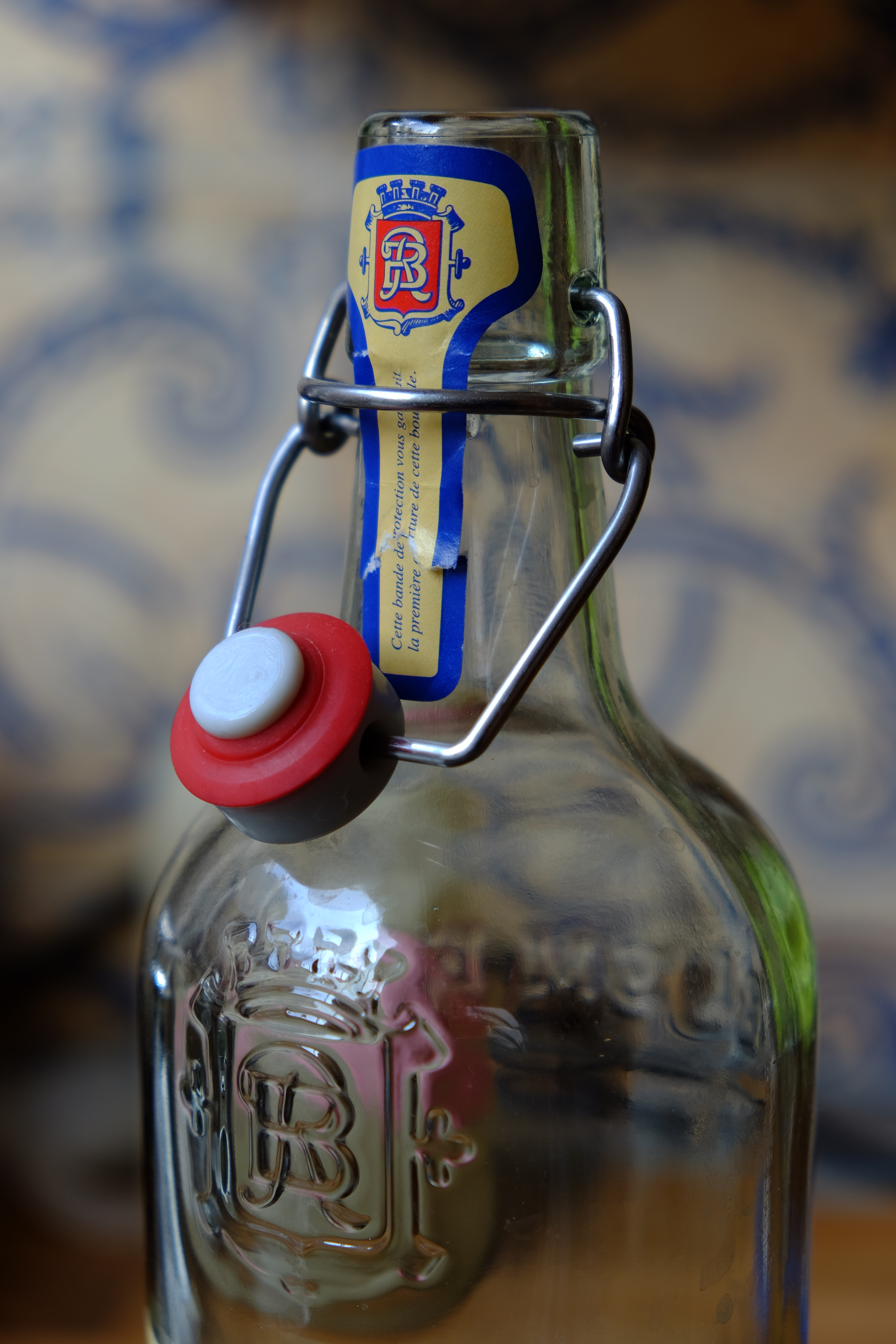
Flip-top or bail closure

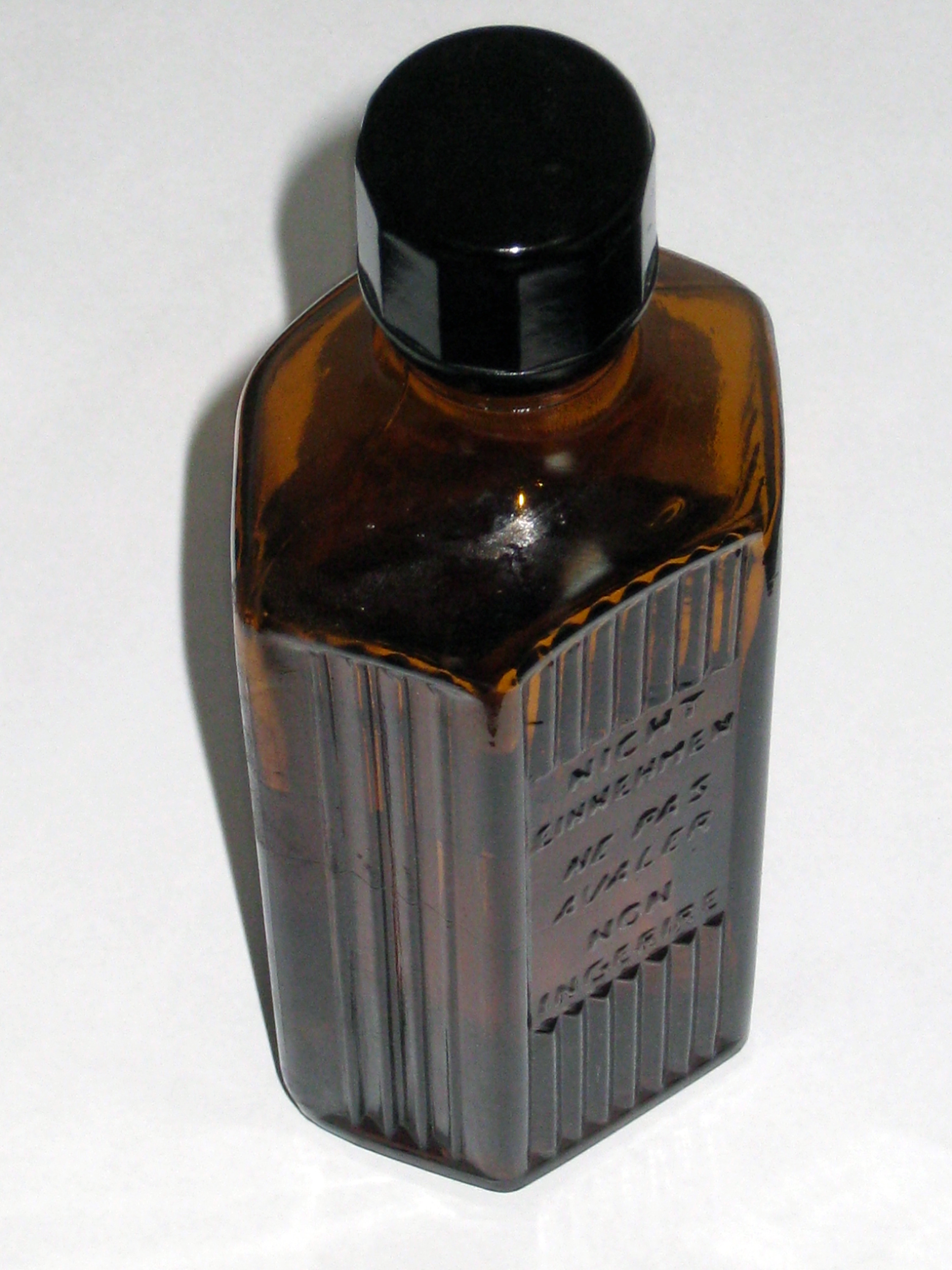
Pharmaceutical bottle

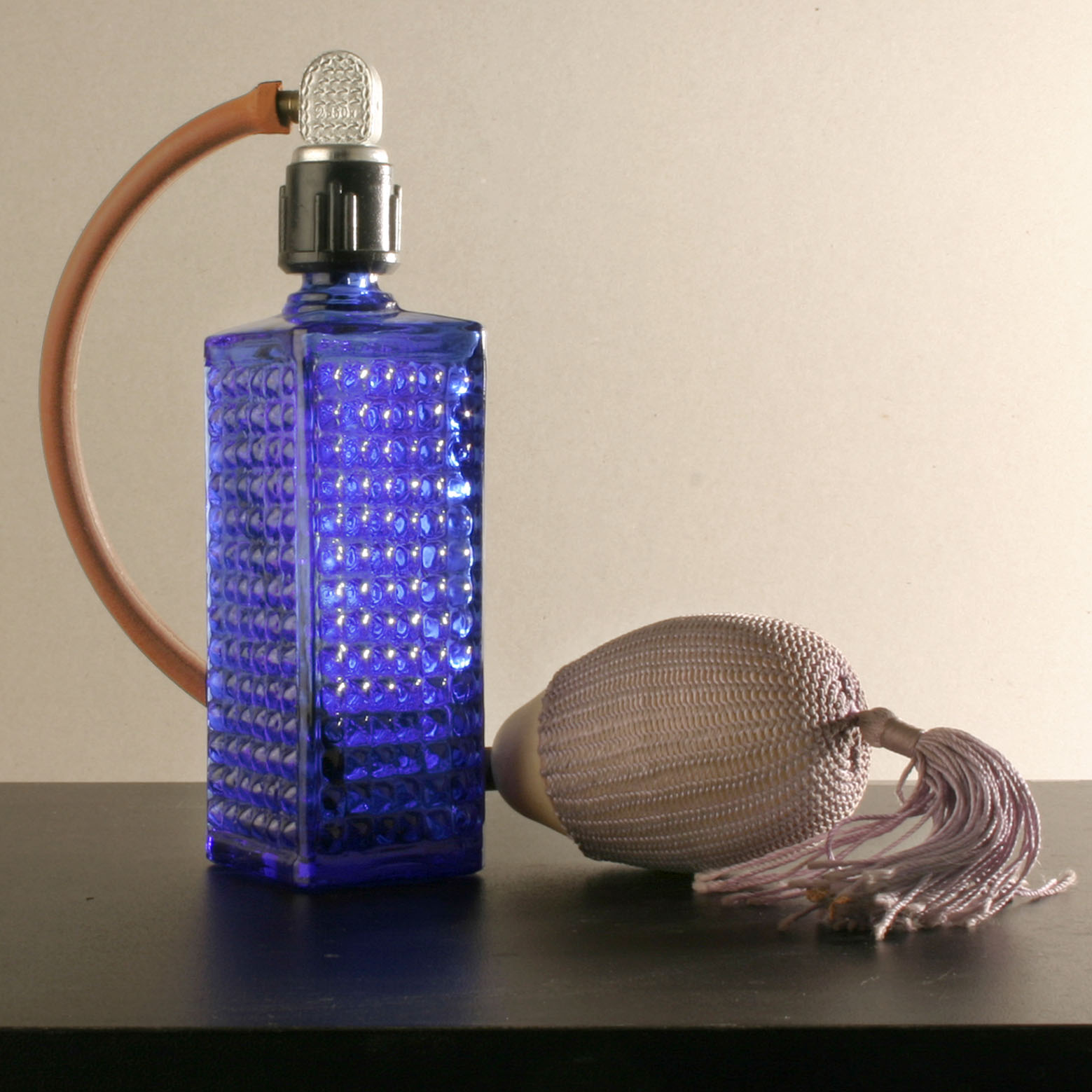
glass spray bottle

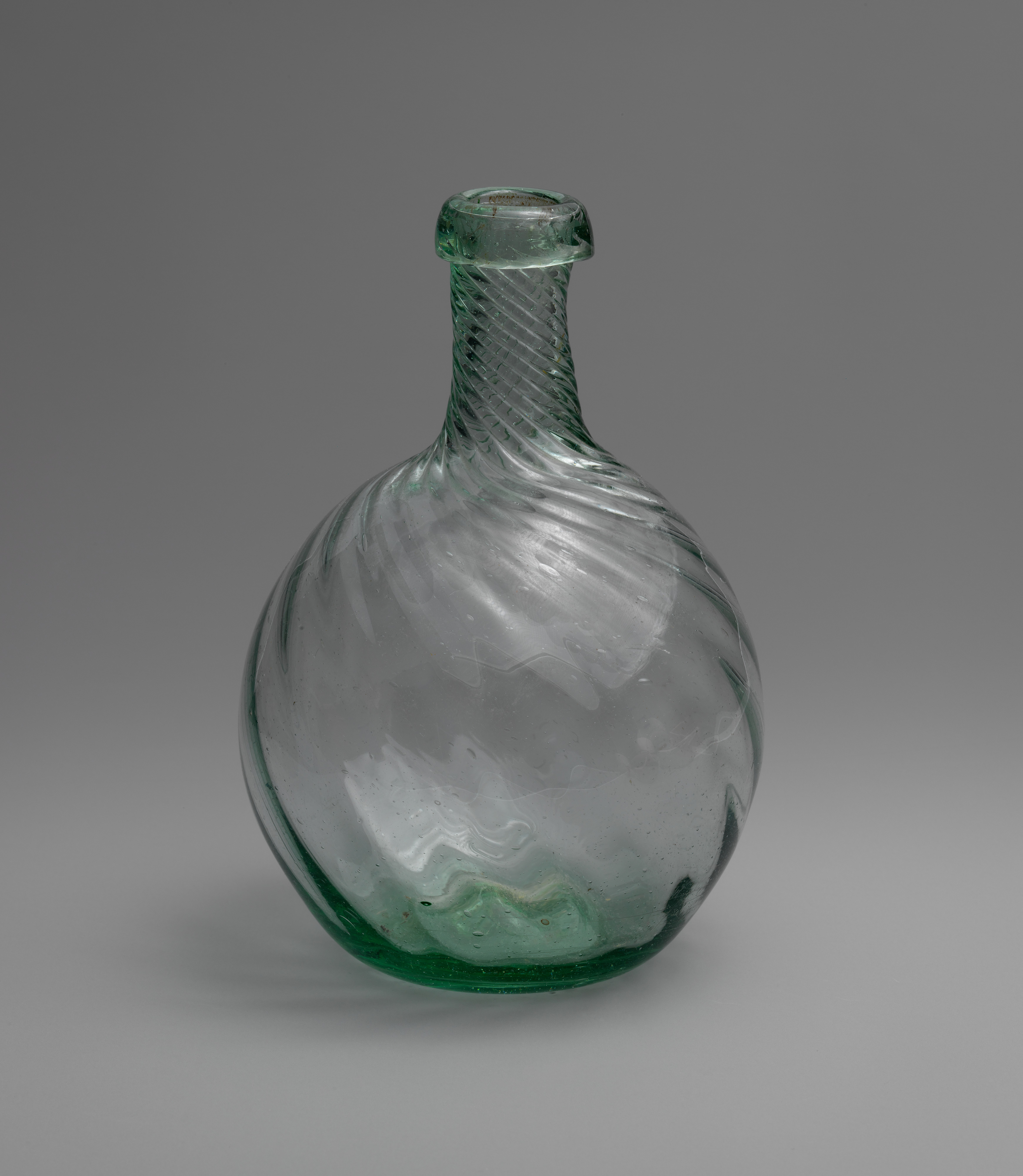
19th century glass bottle in the shape of a calabash

== See also ==
- Blow molding
- Boston round (bottle)
- Closure (container)
- Container glass
- Drink can
- Glass Packaging Institute
- Glass production
- Growler (jug)
- Hutchinson Patent Stopper
- List of bottle types, brands and companies
- Mason jar
- Plastic bottle
