= Nightmare Alley =

Nightmare Alley may refer to:

- Nightmare Alley (novel), a 1946 novel by William Lindsay Gresham
- Nightmare Alley (1947 film), a film noir, based on the novel
- Nightmare Alley (2021 film), a drama thriller film, a new adaptation of the novel
  - Nightmare Alley (soundtrack), the soundtrack to the film
- "Nightmare Alley" (Altered Carbon), a 2020 television episode
