= The Closet Opened =

Cookery book by Kenelm Digby

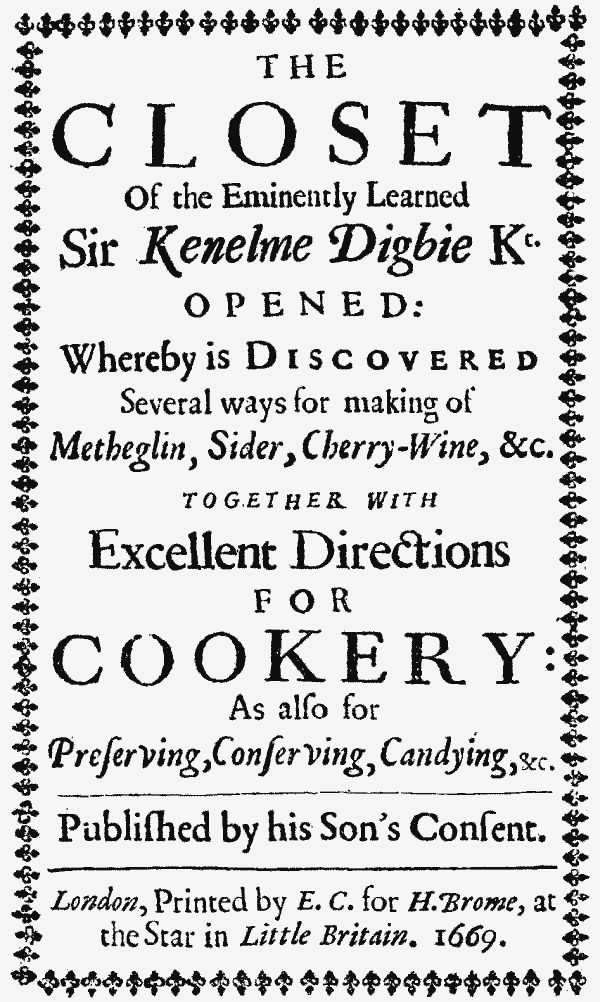
- Author: Sir Kenelm Digby (attrib.)
- Subject: Cookery
- Publisher: H. Brome
- Publication date: 1669
- Publication place: England
- Pages: 251

The Closet of the Eminently Learned Sir Kenelme Digbie Kt. Opened, (Note: The complete title is The closet of the eminently learned Sir Kenelm Digbie Kt. opened: Whereby is discovered several ways for making of metheglin, sider, cherry-wine &c. together with excellent directions for cookery: as also for preserving, conserving, candying, &c.) commonly known as The Closet Opened, is an English cookery book first printed in 1669. The title page states that it is based upon the writings of Sir Kenelm Digby, "published by his son's consent".

The book gives recipes for traditional English dishes such as meat pies, pasties and syllabub, but also reflects on Digby's travels around Europe, with recipes such as "Pan Cotto, as the Cardinals use in Rome". The book echoes an earlier age with some hundred recipes for brewing mead and metheglin.

== Book ==
=== Approach ===
The book consists entirely of recipes, with no structured introduction. There are no illustrations. There is an alphabetical index at the end.

Digby makes use of ingredients including flowers, vegetables, meats, herbs, spices, alcohol, fruits and berries, eggs, milk, grains, and honey.

Foreign influence can be seen in recipes such as "Pan Cotto, as the Cardinals use in Rome", and "A savoury and nourishing boiled Capon, Del Conte di Trino, a Milano," which calls for costly ambergris, dates, raisins, currants and sugar; the bird is boiled inside an ox bladder.

Advice is given that diverges from the recipe headings onto related topics. In "Tea with Eggs", it is advised not to let tea soak too long in hot water "which makes it extract into itself the earthy parts of the herb", but "The water is to remain upon it no longer then whiles you can say the Miserere Psalm very leisurely... Thus you have only the spiritual parts of the Tea".

Similarly under "Pan Cotto", the author gives general advice upon breakfasting, recommending "juyce of Orange" (orange juice), cream of oatmeal or barley, and ending "Two poched eggs with a few fine dry-fryed Collops of pure Bacon, are not bad for breakfast, or to begin a meal".

Instructions are given "to feed Chickens" and other poultry.

=== Recipes ===
The Closet Opened begins with a section (pages 1 to 103) on brewing soft and alcoholic drinks. There are many recipes for mead and metheglin, and some for ale, cider, and wines from fruits including cherry and strawberry.

It then provides recipes for "sallets", eggs, potage, meat pie and meat and vegetable pasties, cooked and prepared meats, syllabub, cakes, pies, puddings and other desserts.

The book ends with recipes for jellies, marmalade, quince paste, jams and syrups.

=== Editions ===
The Closet Opened appeared in the following editions:

- 1669, first edition, H. Brome
- 1671, second edition, H. Brome
- 1677, third edition, H. Brome
- 1910, with an introduction by Anne Macdonell
- 1967, Mallinckrodt collection of food classics, volume 6
- 1997, edited by Jane Stevenson and Peter Davidson

== Review ==
The celebrity cook Clarissa Dickson Wright described Digby as "the first true dilettante foodie", as well as a "privateer, a spy, a hypochondriac and also an enthusiastic amateur scientist." She notes that The Closet Opened indicates his social connections, with recipes like Lord George's Meathe, The Sweet Drink of My Lady Stuart and My Lord Lumley's Pease-Porage. His scientific interests are similarly hinted at with Dr Harvey's Pleasant Water Cider, while other recipes give evidence of his travels abroad. What she finds most fascinating, however, is the wealth of food influences, and the trends that appear.

Dickson Wright argues that the taste for "lighter and clearer" soups than the thick pottages of the Middle Ages indicates either French or Scottish influences: she writes that these are indistinguishable because of the strength of French influence in Scotland at the time. She contrasts such novelty with the distinctly old-fashioned feeling of other recipes, especially the hundred versions of "those wonderfully medieval drinks mead and metheglin." She confesses that "One of the very few things in this world I regret never having tasted—and now never will—is his recipe for sack, that is, sherry, flavoured with clove gilly-flowers (carnations or pinks)."
