= Kenelm Digby =

English courtier and diplomat

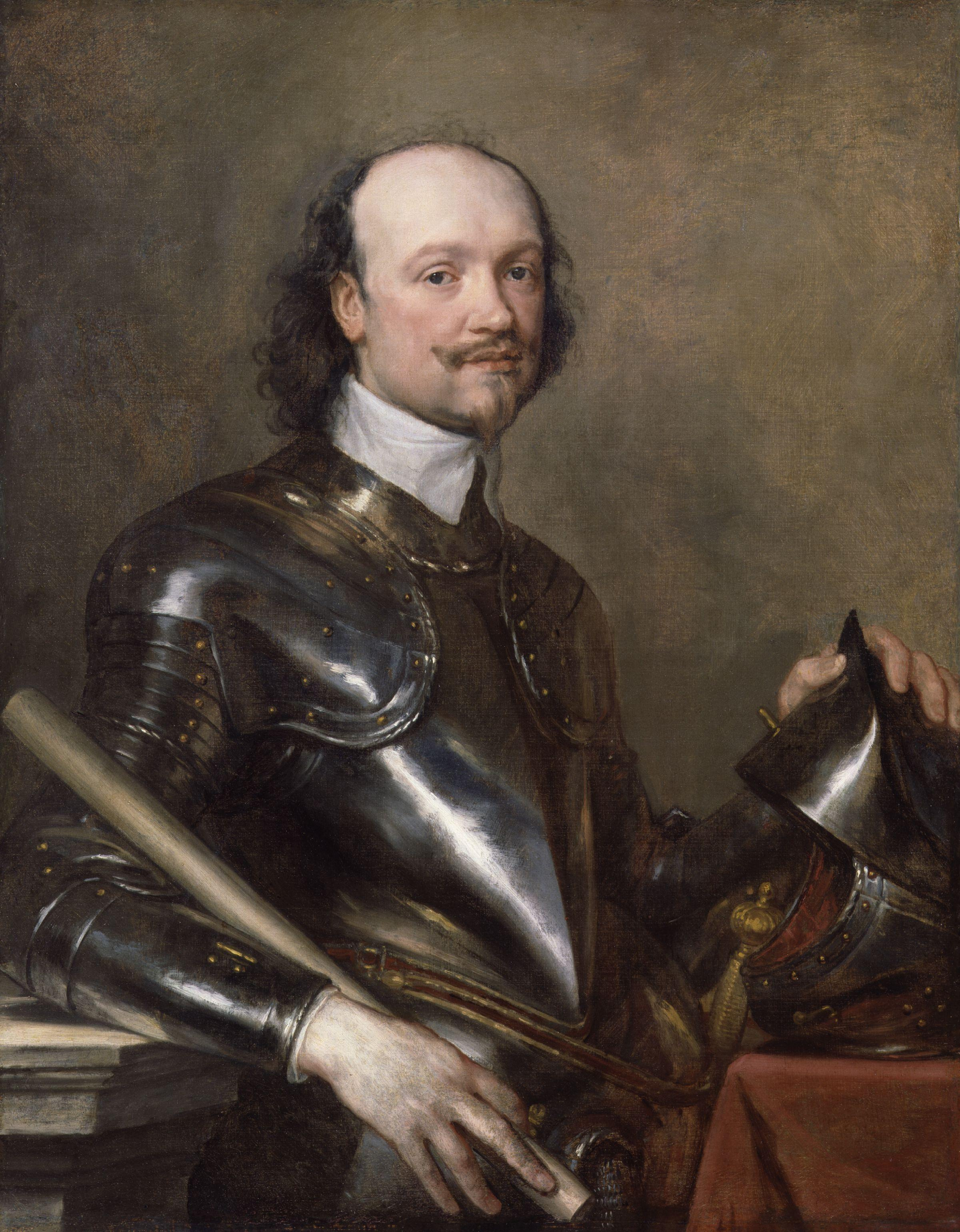
Sir Kenelm Digby by Sir Anthony van Dyck, c. 1640

Sir Kenelm Digby (11 July 1603 – 11 June 1665) was an English courtier and diplomat. He was also a highly reputed natural philosopher, astrologer and known as a leading Catholic intellectual and Blackloist. For his versatility, he is described in John Pointer's Oxoniensis Academia (1749) as the "Magazine of all Arts and Sciences, or (as one stiles him) the Ornament of this Nation".

== Early life and education ==
Digby was born at Gayhurst, Buckinghamshire, England. He was of landed gentry stock, but his family's Roman Catholicism impeded his career. His father, Sir Everard, was executed in 1606 for his part in the Gunpowder Plot. Kenelm was sufficiently in favour with James I to be proposed as a member of Edmund Bolton's projected Royal Academy (with George Chapman, Michael Drayton, Ben Jonson, John Selden and Sir Henry Wotton). His mother was Mary, daughter of William Mushlo. His uncle, John Digby, was the first Earl of Bristol.

He went to Gloucester Hall, Oxford, in 1618, where he was taught by Thomas Allen, but left without taking a degree. In time Allen bequeathed to Digby his library, and the latter donated it to the Bodleian.

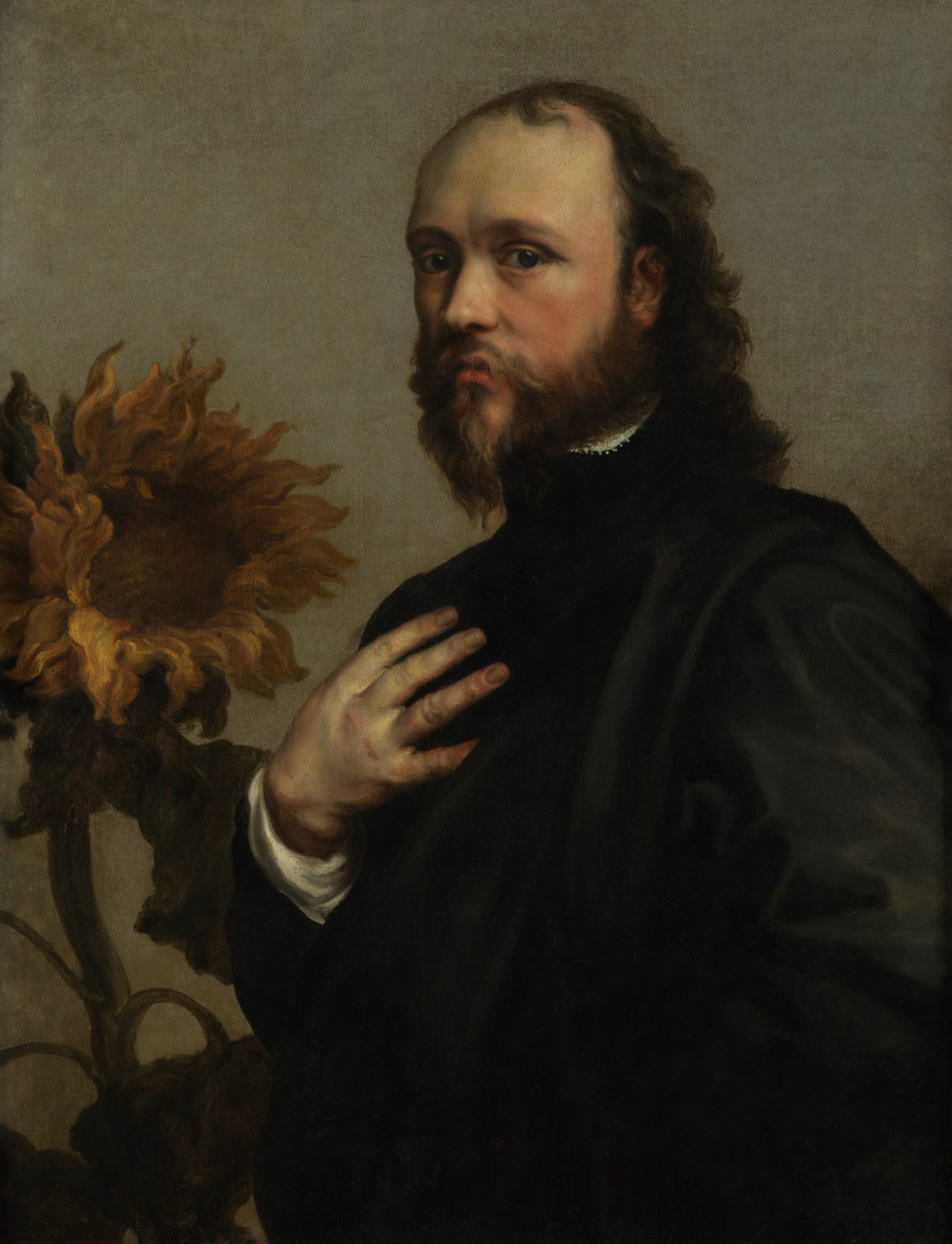
Kenelm Digby by workshop of van Dyck

He spent three years on the Continent between 1620 and 1623, where Marie de Medici fell madly in love with him (as he later recounted). In 1623, in Madrid, Digby was appointed to the household of Prince Charles, who had just arrived there. Returning to England the same year, he was knighted by James I and appointed gentleman of the privy chamber to Charles. He was granted a Cambridge Master of Arts on the King's visit to the university in 1624.

== Career ==
Around 1625, he married Venetia Stanley, whose wooing he cryptically described in his memoirs. He had also become a member of the Privy Council of Charles I of England. As his Roman Catholicism hindered appointment to government office, he converted to Anglicanism.

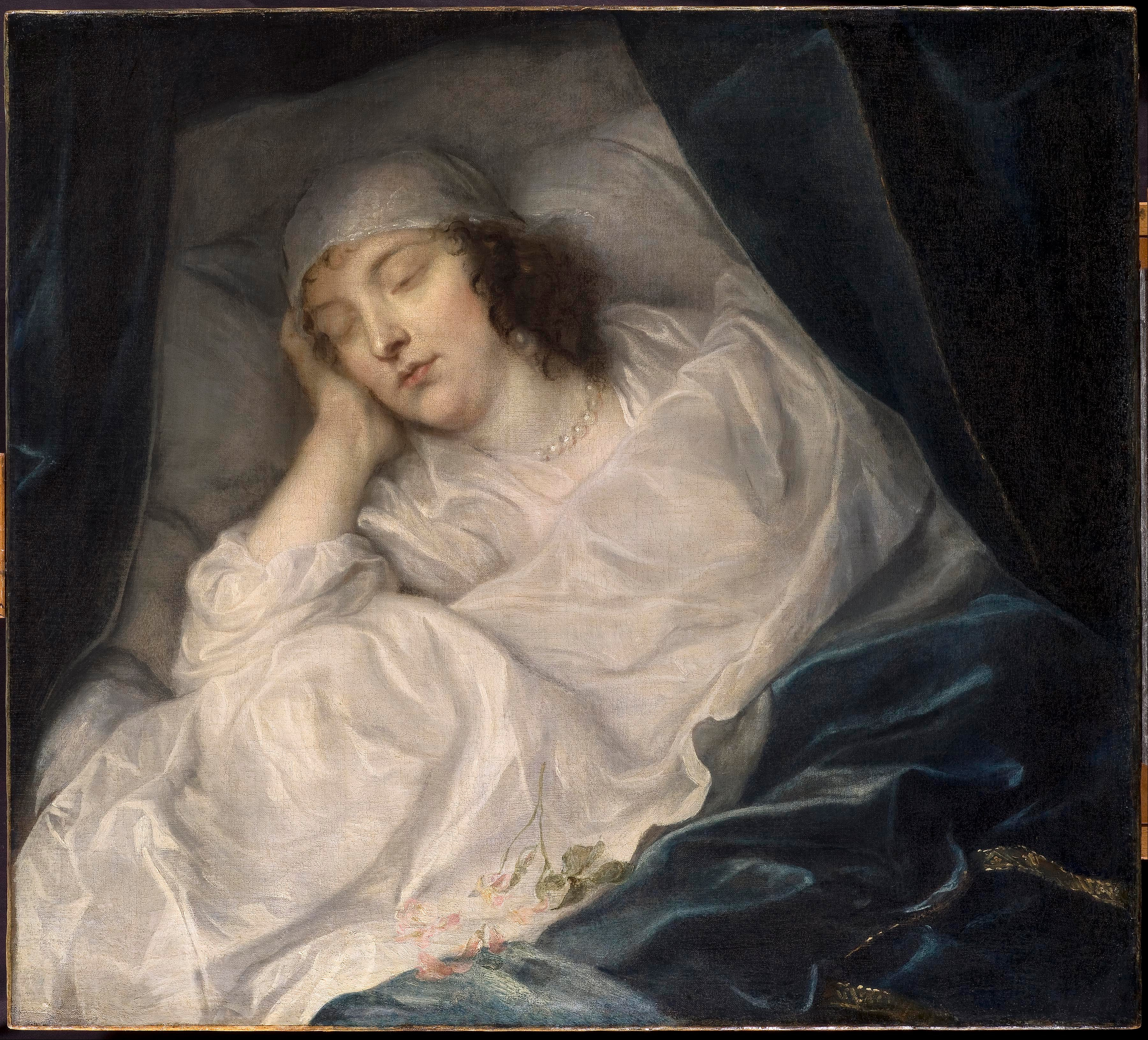
Venetia Stanley on her Death Bed by van Dyck, 1633, Dulwich Picture Gallery

Digby became a privateer in 1627. Sailing his flagship, the Eagle (later renamed Arabella), he arrived off Gibraltar on 18 January and captured several Spanish and Flemish vessels. From 15 February to 27 March he remained at anchor off Algiers due to illness of his men, and extracted a promise from authorities of better treatment of the English ships: he persuaded the city governors to free 50 English slaves. He seized a Dutch vessel near Mallorca, and after other adventures gained a victory over the French and Venetian ships in the harbour of Iskanderun on 11 June. His successes, however, brought upon the English merchants the risk of reprisals, and he was urged to depart. He returned to become a naval administrator and later Governor of Trinity House.

His wife Venetia, a noted beauty, died suddenly in 1633, prompting a famous deathbed portrait by Van Dyck and a eulogy by Ben Jonson. (Digby was later Jonson's literary executor. Jonson's poem about Venetia is now partially lost, because of the loss of the centre sheet of a leaf of papers which held the only copy.) Digby, stricken with grief and the object of enough suspicion for the Crown to order an autopsy (rare at the time) on Venetia's body, secluded himself in Gresham College and attempted to forget his personal woes through scientific experimentation and a return to Catholicism. At Gresham College he held an unofficial post, receiving no payment from the college. Digby, alongside Hungarian chemist Johannes Banfi Hunyades, constructed a laboratory under the lodgings of Gresham Professor of Divinity where the two conducted botanical experiments.

At that period, public servants were often rewarded with patents of monopoly; Digby received the regional monopoly of sealing wax in Wales and the Welsh Borders. This was a guaranteed income; more speculative were the monopolies of trade with the Gulf of Guinea and with Canada. These were doubtless more difficult to police.

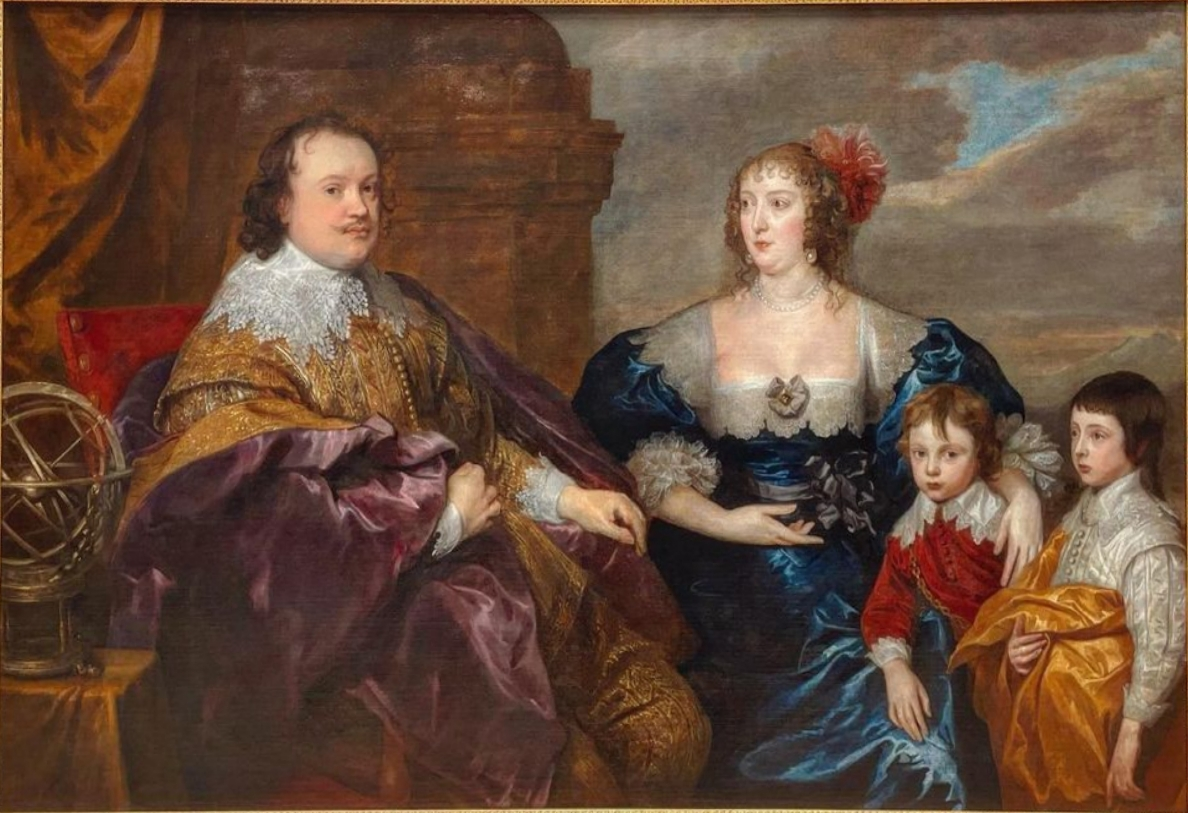
Family portrait of Sir Kenelm Digby and Lady Venetia Anastasia Stanley with their sons Kenelm and John by van Dyck

== Marriage and children ==
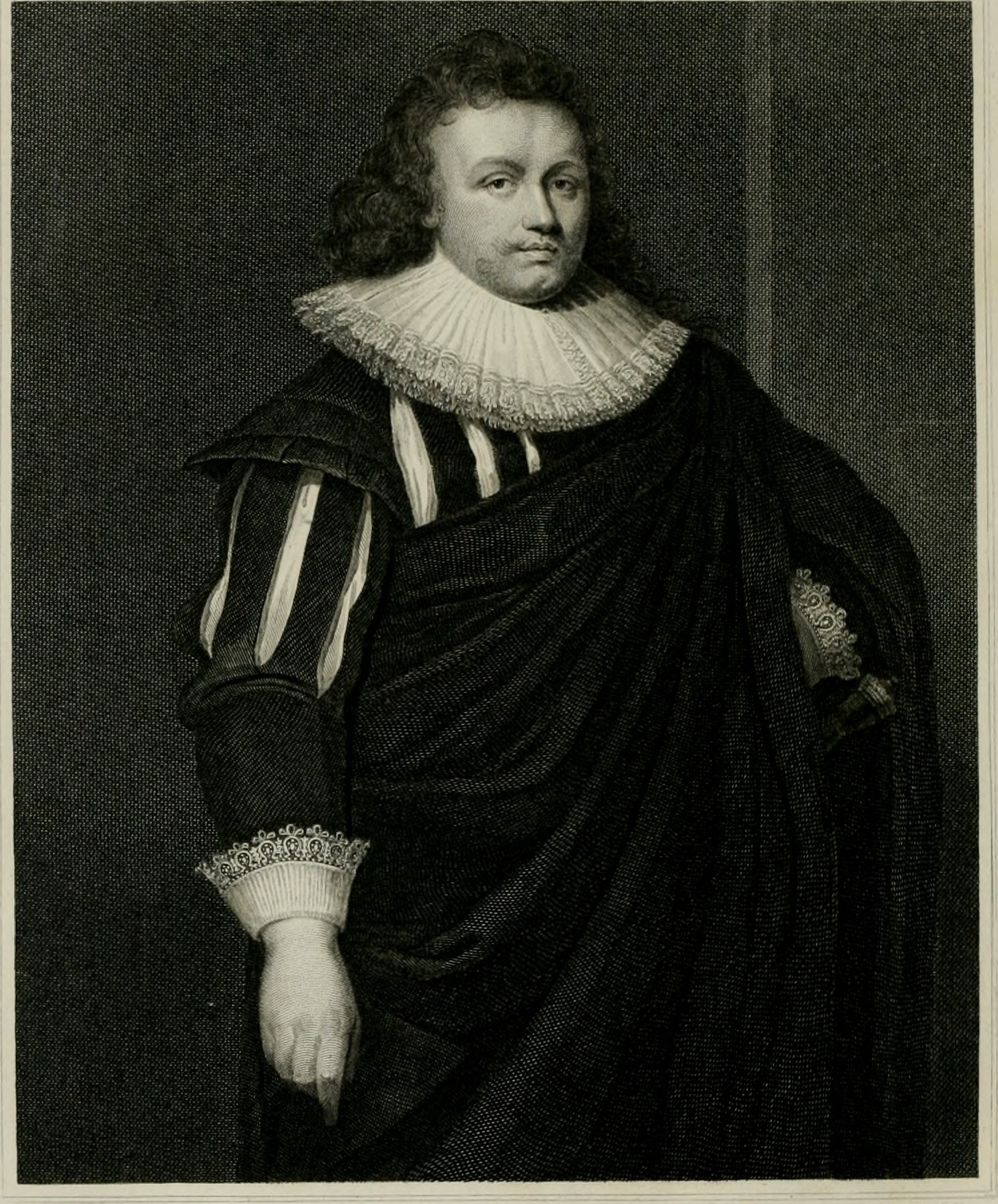
Portrait by Cornelius Johnson

Digby married Venetia Stanley in 1625. They had six sons:

- Kenelm Jr. (1625–1648), killed at the Battle of St Neots, 10 July 1648.
- John (1627–?), only son to survive Digby. He married and had two daughters.
- Everard (1629–1629), died in infancy.
- unnamed twins (1632), miscarriage.
- George (c. 1633–1648), died of illness in school.

In addition, there was a daughter, Margery. Born c. 1625, who married Edward Dudley of Clopton and had at least one child. She is never mentioned by Digby in his writings. She may have been the daughter of Edward Sackville, 4th Earl of Dorset and Venetia Stanley prior to her marriage to Sir Kenelm. The Earl of Dorset settled an annuity on her. There is some controversy and confusion about whether or not Venetia had affairs with both the third and fourth Earls of Dorset and, consequently, which Earl was the father of Margery.

== Catholicism and Civil War ==
Digby became a Catholic once more in 1635. He went into voluntary exile in Paris, where he spent most of his time until 1660. There he met both Marin Mersenne and Thomas Hobbes.

Returning to support Charles I in his struggle to establish episcopacy in Scotland (the Bishops' Wars), he found himself increasingly unpopular with the growing Puritan party. In the time between 1639 and 1640, he supported Charles I's expedition against the Presbyterian Scots. He left England for France again in 1641. Following an incident in which he killed a French nobleman, Mont le Ros, in a duel, he returned to England via Flanders in 1642, and was jailed by the House of Commons. He was eventually released at the intervention of Anne of Austria, and went back again to France. He remained there during the remainder of the period of the English Civil War. Parliament declared his property in England forfeit.

Queen Henrietta Maria had fled England in 1644, and he became her Chancellor. He was then engaged in unsuccessful attempts to solicit support for the English monarchy from Pope Innocent X. His son, also called Kenelm, was killed at the Battle of St Neots, 1648. Following the establishment of the Protectorate under Oliver Cromwell, who believed in freedom of conscience, Digby was received by the government as a sort of unofficial representative of English Roman Catholics, and was sent in 1655 on a mission to the Papacy to try to reach an understanding. This again proved unsuccessful.

At the Restoration, Digby found himself in favour with the new regime due to his ties with Henrietta Maria, the Queen Mother. However, he was often in trouble with Charles II, and was once even banished from Court. Nonetheless, he was generally highly regarded until his death at Covent Garden, London, a month before his 62nd birthday, from "the stone", likely caused by kidney stones. He was buried in his wife's tomb (which was damaged in the great fire of 1666), in Christ Church, Newgate Street, London.

== Character and works ==
Digby published a work of apologetics in 1638, A Conference with a Lady about choice of a Religion. In it he argued that the Catholic Church, possessing alone the qualifications of universality, unity of doctrine and uninterrupted apostolic succession, is the only true church, and that the intrusion of error into it is impossible.

Digby was regarded as an eccentric by contemporaries, partly because of his effusive personality, and partly because of his interests in scientific matters. Henry Stubbe called him "the very Pliny of our age for lying". He lived in a time when scientific enquiry had not settled down in any disciplined way. He spent enormous time and effort in the pursuits of astrology, and alchemy which he studied in the 1630s with Van Dyck.

Notable among his pursuits was the concept of the powder of sympathy. This was a kind of sympathetic magic; one manufactured a powder using appropriate astrological techniques, and daubed it, not on the injured part, but on whatever had caused the injury. His book on this mythical salve went through 29 editions. Synchronising the effects of the powder, which allegedly caused a noticeable effect on the patient when applied, was actually suggested in 1687 as a means of solving the longitude problem.

In 1644 he published together two major philosophical treatises, The Nature of Bodies and On the Immortality of Reasonable Souls. The latter was translated into Latin in 1661 by John Leyburn. These Two Treatises were his major natural-philosophical works, and showed a combination of Aristotelianism and atomism.

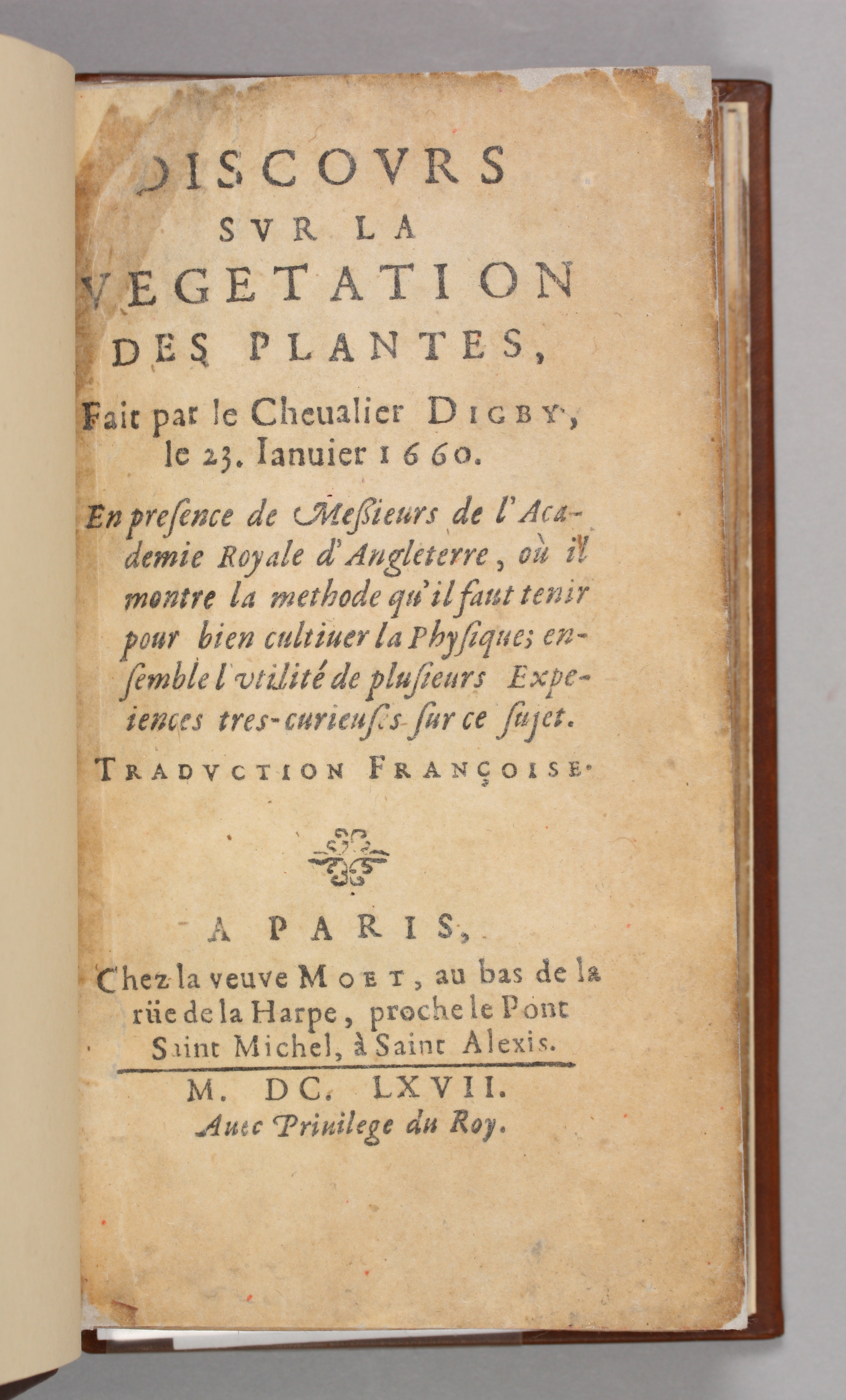
Discours sur la vegetation des plantes, 1667

He was in touch with the leading intellectuals of the time, and was highly regarded by them; he was a founding member of the Royal Society and a member of its governing council from 1662 to 1663. His correspondence with Fermat contains the only extant mathematical proof by Fermat, a demonstration, using his method of descent, that the area of a Pythagorean triangle cannot be a square. His Discourse Concerning the Vegetation of Plants (1661) proved controversial among the Royal Society's members. It was published in French in 1667. Digby is credited with being the first person to note the importance of "vital air", or oxygen, to the sustenance of plants. He also came up with a crude theory of photosynthesis.

Digby is known for the publication of a cookbook, The Closet of the Eminently Learned Sir Kenelme Digbie Kt. Opened, but it was actually published by a close servant, from his notes, in 1669, several years after his death. It is currently considered an excellent source of period recipes, particularly for beverages such as mead. He tried out many of his recipes on his wife, Venetia, one of which was capons fed on the flesh of vipers.

Digby is also considered the father of the modern wine bottle. During the 1630s, Digby owned a glassworks at Newnham-on-Severn and manufactured glass onions, which were globular in shape with a high, tapered neck, a collar, and a punt. His manufacturing technique involved a coal furnace, made hotter than usual by the inclusion of a wind tunnel, and a higher ratio of sand to potash and lime than was customary. Digby's technique produced wine bottles which were stronger and more stable than most of their day, and which due to their translucent green or brown color protected the contents from light. During his exile and prison term, others claimed his technique as their own, but in 1662 Parliament recognised his claim to the invention as valid.

== In fiction ==
Digby and his wife are the subjects of the 2014 literary novel Viper Wine by Hermione Eyre.

He is mentioned in Nathaniel Hawthorne's novel The Scarlet Letter. In the chapter titled "The Leech", the narrator describes the antagonist, Chillingworth, as having an impressive knowledge of medicine, remarking that Chillingworth claims to have been a colleague of Digby "and other famous men" in the study of natural philosophy. Digby's "scientific attainments" are called "hardly less than supernatural".

Digby also appears in Umberto Eco's novel The Island of the Day Before as "Mr. d'Igby". He explains the principle of his sympathetic powder (unguentum armarium) to the main character.

== See also ==
- Digby Mythographer
- The Closet of the Eminently Learned Sir Kenelme Digbie Kt. Opened – a 1669 cookery book supposedly based on Digby's writings
