= Nightmare Alley (soundtrack) =

Film score by Nathan Johnson
- Released: December 17, 2021
- Recorded: 2021
- Genre: Film score
- Length: 49:38
- Label: Hollywood
- Producer: Nathan Johnson

Nathan Johnson chronology
Knives Out (2019)	Nightmare Alley (2021)	Glass Onion: A Knives Out Mystery (2022)

Nightmare Alley: Original Motion Picture Soundtrack is the soundtrack album to the 2021 film of the same name directed by Guillermo del Toro. The film's music was initially set to be composed by Alexandre Desplat, but was replaced by Nathan Johnson, after Desplat exited the film due to scheduling conflicts. Johnson completed the film's score within six weeks, where the score was recorded at the Newman Scoring Stage in 20th Century Studios and was released by Hollywood Records digitally on December 17, 2021 and a physical release on December 31, 2021.

== Development ==
After scoring for The Shape of Water (2017), Alexandre Desplat was reported to collaborate with Guillermo del Toro for the second time, for the score of Nightmare Alley. His involvement was officially confirmed in February 2021. However, Desplat exited the project due to the COVID-19 pandemic lockdown and his commitments with Wes Anderson's The French Dispatch (2021). In that October, Nathan Johnson took over the scoring duties. del Toro had contacted Johnson during the shoot of Glass Onion: A Knives Out Mystery (2022), for composing the film after Desplat's exit and had showcased a copy of his films: Pan's Labyrinth (2006) and The Shape Of Water. He watched those films without music and felt "blown away by what he had created", agreeing to do the film. As the film was set for a December 2021, Johnson nearly had six to seven weeks to score the entire film. del Toro visited Johnson's studio, per week and examined the scoring process, and gave him creative freedom on the score, asking him to do what he usually approached with his music, citing Knives Out as a reference; he added that "he didn't really give me a whole lot of references. It was really fun in that way because I got to immerse myself. I just started sending him music and he was responding really positively to that. Then we would refine things together."

Johnson had pitched on the lead characters for the music, instead of the noir genre-type music. For Stanton Carlisle (Bradley Cooper), Johnson added that with Western narratives usually have character arcs, where a character would start in one place, go through a journey and become a totally different person by the end. But Carlisle's character "never changes throughout the film". Hence Johnson had described his musical approach as:

"My idea for him was a single piano note that we introduce at the very beginning. As it repeats, we introduce dissonance that we develop into a motif. Then as he moves through the movie and begins putting on these masks, we begin filling out the score. It becomes lush and orchestral when he goes to the big city but really that same note is there underneath it. When we strip everything away, that same piano note is the last thing we hear. So Stan's theme is a simple motif that’s anchored in a single note that's there through the whole movie."

Lilith (Cate Blanchett) is the film's main antagonist, whom del Toro described it as "the best-onscreen femme fatale" and, according to Johnson, "her theme is a very simple, beautiful oboe motif on top of very dissonant, unsettling strings. I love her character. It's like this calm, placid surface and then underneath, she has a hurricane." To combine the sense of beauty with danger underneath, Johnson had said "Even with the rhythmic element in Lilith’s theme, there's a piano lurch in there that is not quite straight, it's kind of doing this push and pull that normally is more at home in hip hop. All of that works together as an unsettling agent. It was really important that we never allowed the score to tell you she's all good or she's all bad." For Molly (Rooney Mara), del Toro asked Johnson for a theme that would "break" his heart, saying "It was about innocence, really. Molly has this hopefulness and part of that comes from these promises that Stan keeps repeating. He promises her the world and everything in it. Towards the end of the movie, she realises all of his promises are lies" and continued "With Molly's theme, it was just a very beautiful, simple motif. But it was something that we allowed Stan's character to be able to steal from Molly and apply to Lilith."

The carnival sequence that had Clem (Willem Dafoe) telling Carlisle on how to get a guy to become a geek, does not have a score, which is "just living in the harshness of that moment" and the concluding 15 minutes of the film had "huge score" with Johnson agreeing with Guillermo's terms "What's great about getting to score a movie is it's not about how many notes you can put in, and where you put the notes. It's also about that rhythm. Characters are king in a movie, but rhythm is queen."

== Track listing ==
No.	Title	Length
1.	"Man or Beast"	3:28
2.	"Storm's a Comin'"	2:28
3.	"Zeena's Spook Show"	1:45
4.	"A Steady Job"	4:36
5.	"The Face of God"	2:58
6.	"Open Graves"	1:29
7.	"Shoeflies"	3:13
8.	"Molly's Theme"	1:08
9.	"Copa Spook Show"	2:06
10.	"Stan Takes the Hook"	2:19
11.	"Lilith's Room"	3:03
12.	"Molly, Are You Alright?"	0:37
13.	"Reading Mrs. Kimball"	2:40
14.	"The Take"	1:36
15.	"Lie Detector"	7:44
16.	"Time You Delivered"	2:43
17.	"The Poison Apple"	2:17
18.	"Grindle's Ghost"	7:13
19.	"Lilith's Revenge"	5:56
20.	"Theme from Nightmare Alley – Solo Piano"	3:52
Total length:		63:11

== Reception ==
Benjamin Lee and Mark Kermode of The Guardian mentioned the score as "grand", "menacing" and "lustrous". Tim Grearson of Screen International called the score as "elegant, consciously old-fashioned", and Flickering Myth called it as an "effectively minimalist yet haunting score, that beautifully complements del Toro’s neo-noir psychologically thriller." Filmtracks.com wrote "The ambience of the score is neither mysterious nor alluring, failing to establish any noir feeling whatsoever. It is intellectually intriguing but surprisingly boring, a massively missed opportunity for a fiendishly devious score to thrive with the setting and these characters. The hour-long album is capped by a solo piano version of Stan's theme, by which point you'll be long tuned out."

== Accolades ==
Ceremony	Category	Recipients	Results	Ref.
Critics Choice Movie Awards	Best Score	Nathan Johnson	Nominated	
Hollywood Music in Media Awards	Best Original Score in a Feature Film	Nathan Johnson	Nominated	
Saturn Awards	Best Music	Nathan Johnson	Nominated	

== Personnel ==
Credits adapted from AllMusic.

- Ashley Andrew-Jones – assistant engineer
- Kevin Banks – editing
- Clint Bennett – editing
- Philip Cobb – trumpet
- Peter Cobbin – mixing, recording
- Judson Crane – programming
- Tim Gill – cello
- Brad Haehnel – recording
- Rebecca Hordern – assistant engineer
- Nathan Johnson – composer, producer
- Chris Mears – percussion
- Janey Miller – oboe
- John Mills – orchestra leader
- Chris Pattishall – piano
- Cécile de Tournesac – editing
- Kirsty Whalley – mixing, recording
