= Wake Up Dead Man (soundtrack) =

Wake Up Dead Man (Original Motion Picture Soundtrack)

Film score by Nathan Johnson
- Released: November 28, 2025
- Recorded: 2025
- Studio: Abbey Road Studios
- Genre: Film score
- Length: 53:18
- Label: Cut Narrative
- Producer: Nathan Johnson

Nathan Johnson chronology
Glass Onion: A Knives Out Mystery (2022)	Wake Up Dead Man (2025)

Wake Up Dead Man (Original Motion Picture Soundtrack) is the film score to the 2025 film Wake Up Dead Man (Note: Subtitled as A Knives Out Mystery) directed by Rian Johnson; It is a standalone sequel to Glass Onion (2022) and the third installment overall in the Knives Out film series, with Daniel Craig reprising his role as master detective Benoit Blanc. The film score is composed by Nathan Johnson and released through Cut Narrative Records on November 28, 2025.

== Development ==
Rian's cousin and recurrent collaborator Nathan Johnson had returned to compose for Wake Up Dead Man, after working on the previous instalments. Like his previous ventures, Nathan involved in the film very early with Rian pitching him ideas about the film and also involved in the film's production in London. The predecessors being different in one way or the other, led the music to reflect in such a way, with "sharp, angular quartet" in Knives Out (2019), and a "big and broad, a lush, romantic orchestra" in Glass Onion: A Knives Out Mystery (2022). For Wake Up Dead Man, they went for a darker and more gothic approach.

Nathan noted that the first thing being heard in the score is the sound of the entire string section scraping their bows against the strings and then resolves into a single pure tone. Though being conceptual, it was also a tug of war between ugliness and beauty, and between light and dark—which Rian and cinematographer Steve Yedlin create visual parallels between light and darkness—that symbolizes the entire film. This sound represents the jewel which the characters are looking out for, which Nathan added:

"I think in our world today, things like money or power or a jewel, depending on who controls them, can tip into light or darkness. That just felt like a real resonant idea to explore. This thing that everybody wants, that everybody is after, can be used for good or evil."

Most of the motifs Nathan wrote for the film, actually ended up being conceptual. Though the film being set in a church, an environment that was closely associated with music, Rian and Nathan decided to not lean on churchy music, but use elements related to that. Nathan used multiple harps, but they were played in an odd, rhythmic way, and in a key scene, it anchors with the lowest string being plucked, providing a dreadful element which was quite ironic as the instrument itself is associated with a heavenly tone.

While planning to record the score at the Abbey Road Studios in London, Rian and Nathan found a giant old stone church in London, where they decided to record a quartet with textural recordings. While using the orchestra, he tried to subvert with the usual sounds, where a bunch of bass clarinets had been used as percussive sounds, by using the keys in a sort of cascading, laggy and imperfect sound, something like "spiders crossed with falling dominoes". They also found a half-broken harmonium which sounded "creaking and wheezing" which he recorded and slowed it down. He added, "it feels like the wood is creaking and ropes are pulling across old timbers. It"s not something that you would pick out, but you feel this creaky dread that something is coming."

Nathan wrote the piece "The Confession" as a violin concerto, which had a delicate single voice, which can move between the drama and quietness, and is strong enough to convince an entire congregation to follow it. The entire piece was written and recorded in G minor.

== Release ==
The soundtrack to Wake Up Dead Man released through Nathan's Cut Narrative Records on November 28, 2025. A vinyl edition is scheduled to be released through Mutant.

== Reception ==
Amy Nicholson of Los Angeles Times wrote "Nathan Johnson"s score of scratchy cellos and foreboding horns pairs well with a dramatic burst of organ music". Leah Schnelbach of Reactor wrote "Nathan Johnson"s score is fabulous". Chris Bumbray of JoBlo.com wrote "[Rian's] regular composer Nathan Johnson supplying a Danny Elfman-esque score."

== Track listing ==
No.	Title	Length
1.	"Overture"	0:39
2.	"Eve's Apple"	2:29
3.	"The Flock"	2:43
4.	"Monsignor Wicks"	3:02
5.	"The Confrontation"	1:37
6.	"The Good Friday Murder"	3:03
7.	"Jud's Prayer"	2:13
8.	"The Hollow Man"	1:49
9.	"The Red Thread"	1:40
10.	"A Minor Omission"	2:01
11.	"False Priest"	1:22
12.	"Betrayed"	2:37
13.	"Torching the Flock"	2:40
14.	"Wake Up Dead Man"	2:11
15.	"The Empty Tomb"	1:43
16.	"In the Flesh"	4:06
17.	"Blanc's Revelation"	3:47
18.	"The Confession (Violin Concerto in G Minor)"	8:19
19.	"Vengeance is Mine"	2:31
20.	"Requiem"	2:46
Total length:		53:18

== Additional music ==
The following songs are featured in the film, but not included in the soundtrack:

- "Wanted Dead or Alive" – Warren Zevon
- "Why Should the Devil Have All the Good Music?" – Larry Norman
- "What A Fool Believes" – The Doobie Brothers
- "Skimbleshanks: The Railway Cat" – Andrew Lloyd Webber
- "Overture" (from Phantom of the Opera) – Andrew Lloyd Webber
- "Come On Up To The House" – Tom Waits
