= Digby Mythographer =

The anonymous Digby Mythographer was the compiler of a twelfth-century Fulgentian handbook of Greek mythology, De Natura deorum ("On the Nature of the Gods") that is conserved among the Digby Mss, collected by Sir Kenelm Digby, now in the Bodleian Library, Oxford. An intensely renewed interest in the classics, extending to classical mythography in Latin texts, was expressed in twelfth-century France and England, an aspect of the reviving humanism of the twelfth-century renaissance. Myth was read in allegorical mode, where the surface detail was simply the visible cloak (integumentum) of the hidden Platonic truths they embodied forth. Medieval commentaries on Boethius, Martianus Capella, Ovid, and Virgil also reached a peak during this period, under the impetus of the new cathedral schools.

The Digby Mythographer concentrated on genealogy of the gods, drawn from Ovid, and material from Statius. An edition of the text was edited by V. Brown, "An edition of an anonymous twelfth-century Liber de natura deorum", Medieval Studies 34 (1972).

== See also ==
- Vatican Mythographer
- Alberic of London
- Theodontius
