= Knives Out (soundtrack) =

Knives Out (Original Motion Picture Soundtrack)

Film score by Nathan Johnson
- Released: November 27, 2019
- Recorded: 2018–2019
- Genre: Film score
- Length: 51:44
- Label: Cut Narrative
- Producer: Nathan Johnson

Nathan Johnson chronology
Kill the Messenger (2014)	Knives Out (2019)	Nightmare Alley (2021)

Knives Out (Original Motion Picture Soundtrack) is the soundtrack album to the 2019 film of the same name, directed by Rian Johnson, featuring an ensemble cast includes Daniel Craig, Chris Evans, Ana de Armas, Jamie Lee Curtis, Michael Shannon, Don Johnson, Toni Collette, LaKeith Stanfield, Katherine Langford, Jaeden Martell, and Christopher Plummer. The original score is composed by Nathan Johnson, Rian's cousin and norm collaborator; it also marked Nathan's fourth collaboration with Rian, beginning with Brick (2005), The Brothers Bloom (2009) and Looper (2012), excluding Star Wars: The Last Jedi (2017) which was scored by John Williams. The score album was released by Cut Narrative Records on November 27, 2019, coinciding the film's release.

== Development ==
Rian's first draft for Knives Out was earlier told to Nathan in mid-2010, where he spoke about the film's opening sequence, saying "we're going to start the movie like this. It's just going to be music, and it'll be like this three-minute opening sequence as we set up the whole chessboard, and then proceed to knock it all down." After completing the script in 2018, filming for Knives Out began in October 2018. Unlike the norm of composers scoring the film after watching the final cut post-shooting, Nathan visited the sets of the film in Massachusetts, where the film was being shot, so that it gives him "the ability to explore" and "able to watch the actors perform, which gave him the ability to transport the world inside as it was being created". Nathan wrote a string quarter piece for the opening sequence, which was later expanded into an orchestral score. The score was recorded at Abbey Road Studios in London. It was the first time, he used a full-fledged orchestral score as, for all of Rian's previous films, he created sounds from utensils and real-life objects, due to the limited budget they have in hand. For Knives Out, he also created instrumental sounds using a sandbox.

Both Rian and Nathan discussed about the melodic and motif-heavy themes inspired by the music from the late-1950s and early-1960s. Some of the notable scores, include Bernard Herrmann's compositions, Maurice Jarre's score from Lawrence of Arabia (1962) and Nino Rota's score for Death on the Nile (1972). In those themes, each instrumental voice can be heard and is not "blurry, washed-out sound", with every voice having its pace. Similarly, this was the case with the film, as every actor in the ensemble cast have their own place in the story. The score consists of multiple themes from characters, which includes a family theme flows from Harlan Thrombey (Christopher Plummer), the family partriach and follows his adult children, where the theme plays from all of the characters, adding "He's the stream that everyone flows out of. He created this house for them all to live in. All the stuff in the house is stuff he's written into his books". The protagonist Benoit Blanc (Daniel Craig) has a couple of themes, which are "playful and exploratory pieces". Nathan added "the music is pretty linked directly to the characters and the emotions that are going on. I think that was one of the ways that we were able to anchor that, to have the music as this bedrock, emotionally at least, that is keeping us in the zone of what everybody's feeling. Then plot-wise, the whole movie gets to twist and turn on top of that."

On showing the final cut, Nathan opined that the film was tweaked and refined, but does not feel like rearranging the score into the edit, adding that there were few refinements in the film, but not overall, which helped the consistency in the music. Nathan further felt that the editing of the film, will make significant changes including the music, and Knives Out, had some impact, as "there were more explorations on those movies, in terms of the edit, and trying different things, and finding things, to a certain degree".

The score was composed in an "imperfect way", where string players dig in with their bows, so that he can hear that scraping against the strings, which was "really fun" but also bend it much little to bring some of the "tension and imperfection into that model". Johnson further used Hungarian scales to bring a "jazzy touch" but also "leaning against those notes, which are not exactly right". The theme song "Knives Out! (String Quartet in G Minor)" had a "sharp sound setting the parameters for the score". He further said that "The Will" was his favourite piece to write as "We got to bring back the 'Knives Out Quartet' but with the support of a full orchestra, In that cue, the orchestra plays around with a gigantic string slide. That slide takes us into this unsettling craziness that begins to happen. 'The Will' is the shift in the movie. We break open the doors and we go for the throat."

== Release ==
The score was released into an album titled Knives Out (Original Motion Picture Soundtrack) by Johnson's Cut Narrative Records label. It was published into digital streaming media and physical formats on November 27, 2019, the same day as the film's release. "The Dumbest Car Chase of All Time", a track from the album, was released as a single on November 21.

On the same day, Mondo brought the soundtrack exclusively for publishing in two-disc vinyl formats, and pre-orders for the album were announced. The album was pressed into a 180-gram disc vinyl, containing the full score, plus three bonus tracks: the solo piano version of "The Wake", "Party People" and "Walt Doesn't Run Shit". The album's artwork designed by Jay Shaw, featured a die-cut window and suspect cards, featuring all the characters, that would be inserted into the package. The album's vinyl edition was released on January 17, 2020.

== Reception ==
Knives Out's score by Nathan Johnson received acclaim from critics, who mentioned it as "terrifically ripe", "lush and orchestral". Jonathan Broxton wrote "It's truly gratifying when a score like Knives Out comes out in 2019. [Rian] Johnson and [Nathan] Johnson clearly know and love traditional film music, and appreciate the noirish atmosphere that a good, classical, rich orchestral score can give to a film like this. Their work gives the film a classy sheen that helps enliven the pulpy and sometimes hammy histrionics of the cast, and provides the whole thing with a sense of moodiness and vaguely sinister unease that sells the story and brings the audience into the environment. Johnson's clever use of the two main themes, combined with his wonderfully evocative orchestral textures, is worthy of a great deal of praise, and as I said earlier, it only reminds us what we have been missing for the last five years while Nathan Johnson has been away doing other things."

Filmtracks.com said "Knives Out is a smart composition with a well-developed narrative and just enough charm and elegance to suffice for the plot, but its performances are rather flat" and continued "Johnson maintains a cautious but consistently elegant stance throughout the score, careful not to steal attention but function as though the mansion had a small ensemble of live performers in a neighboring room. The result is highly productive but a step behind the deviousness of the script, this despite the composer's attempt to convey humor through parody applications of his music at times. It is difficult to determine how much of this score was meant as pseudo-parody, for there is an enthusiasm gap between the performances here and what you would hear in an intentionally over-the-top romp." Gisanne Sophia of Marvelous Geeks Media wrote "Nathan Johnson then takes listeners through various familial themes with slower violin strings, building on emotions and the heightened tensions in the air. If listeners accidentally stumble onto this soundtrack and have no idea what the film is about, they'll certainly realize it's not a pleasant tale of bliss and rainbows. It's eerie and spooky, and there's plenty of enigma in every high-strung note. The Knives Out original score is not only a perfect companion to the lunacy of the whodunit film, but it's a brilliant standalone that's especially appropriate for blaring just as it gets dark outside, and the first few drops of rain start to fall."

Johnson's only nomination for Knives Out score is the Best Music held at the 46th Saturn Awards in 2021, losing to John Williams for Star Wars: The Rise of Skywalker. His score was not shortlisted for the Best Original Score category at the 92nd Academy Awards in December 2019, due to an "administrative mix-up" that caused him to be out of the list.

== Track listing ==
All music is composed by Nathan Johnson.

No.	Title	Length
1.	"Knives Out! (String Quartet in G Minor)"	1:50
2.	"The Thrombey Estate"	1:37
3.	"Like Father, Like Son"	1:01
4.	"The Thrombey Family Theme (Solo Piano)"	1:33
5.	"Double-Dipping"	1:04
6.	"Snooping"	2:04
7.	"On the Eve of Harlan's Demise"	3:58
8.	"Harlan's Plan"	3:15
9.	"The Wake"	1:32
10.	"The Attic Room"	1:17
11.	"The Game's Afoot"	3:59
12.	"The Broken Trellis"	2:07
13.	"Knives Out!, Pt. II (The Will)"	3:03
14.	"Foul Play"	3:26
15.	"The Dumbest Car Chase of All Time"	2:56
16.	"Blackmail"	3:13
17.	"No More Surprises"	0:50
18.	"Blanc's Tale, Pt. I"	5:01
19.	"Blanc's Tale, Pt. II"	6:11
20.	"The Thrombey Family Theme"	1:47
Total length:		51:44

Apart from the score, the film features additional tracks that are not included in the album. These include:

- "More Than This" – Roxy Music
- "The Inspector" – Tal Bergman
- "Animal Zoo" – Spirit
- "Righteous Rocker #1" – Larry Norman
- "Sundown" – Gordon Lightfoot
- "Lightning Rod" – Craig Carothers
- "E strano! – 'Ah, fors'è lui'" from La Traviata by Giuseppe Verdi – Anna Netrebko and Vienna Philharmonic conducted by Carlo Rizzi
- "Losing My Mind" from Follies by Stephen Sondheim – Daniel Craig
- "Sweet Virginia" – The Rolling Stones
