= Glass Onion: A Knives Out Mystery (soundtrack) =

Glass Onion: A Knives Out Mystery (Soundtrack from the Netflix Film)

Film score by Nathan Johnson
- Released: November 25, 2022
- Recorded: 2021–2022
- Studio: Abbey Road Studios
- Length: 59:54
- Label: Netflix Music
- Producer: Nathan Johnson

Nathan Johnson chronology
Nightmare Alley (2021)	Glass Onion: A Knives Out Mystery (2022)	Wake Up Dead Man (2025)

Glass Onion: A Knives Out Mystery (Soundtrack from the Netflix Film) is the score album to the 2022 film of the same name directed by Rian Johnson, a sequel to Knives Out (2019). The film's original score is composed by Nathan Johnson, who composed the predecessor and features 27 tracks. The score was released by Netflix Music on November 25, 2022.

== Development ==
Rian's cousin and collaborator Nathan Johnson composed the score for Glass Onion after previously scoring for the predecessor Knives Out. He travelled to Greece to observe the film's principal photography, as with his cousin's previous films, and brought a mobile rig at the location where he would write music for the film during night. Johnson felt that being onset had provided the inspiration that needed to create all of the film's individual themes as he responded to the nuances of what the actors exploring with Rian. The tonal shift of the film, from a jubilant comedy to a mystery thriller had been challenging, with Nathan had to strike with the emotional balance of the score.

It is the first time Nathan had written a full orchestral arrangement for the film's score. A 70-piece orchestra recorded the score at the Abbey Road Studios, which Nathan felt the orchestra "leans towards opulence and grandness". The score was recorded during the COVID-19 pandemic with each section of the orchestra had to be recorded separately due to the restrictions. However, while performing at the Netflix Playlist (a showcase of film and television music) on November 7, 2022, he had only 30 musicians for the performance, though much of the score's nuance being captured.

== Composition ==
Like the first film, Johnson had written several themes and leitmotifs for several characters in order to "tap into the underlying emotions", and added that their characters do not have separate cues as "there was this whole structure that we could play around with this idea of different characters stealing other character's themes". The key to the film score lies in its main theme, with Nathan had opined "There are different character themes that appear for little moments, and as a piece of music, this embodies what the whole theme is about".

Blanc's (Craig) theme consists of various instruments that expand the palette and canvas of the cue. Andi's (Monáe) theme was the centerpiece of the score, as "it anchors a lot of the emotion that happens in the film. There's a simple repeating arpeggio that essentially allows a lot of flexibility, and I'm able to use her theme in a number of different ways." He further appreciated Monáe's performance, which he called it as "really rewarding to see what Janelle [Monáe] was creating with that character and then to try to land the emotion and variety of that performance in a subtextual way".

The track "String Quartet in Bb Minor" is a direct relative of the track "Knives Out! (String Quartet in G Minor)" from the predecessor as while the sequel is bigger than the first film, Nathan felt exciting to write "another string quartet for this film". Without any motive for this, the string quartet begins "at a place of real turmoil for one character in particular, and then kind of explodes in a way that hopefully feels really cathartic to the audience".

== Release ==
The soundtrack to the film was announced on November 10, 2022, with a single—the title theme—was released the following day. The second single, "Glass Onion (String Quartet in Bb Minor) was released through Vanity Fair on November 18. The soundtrack was released on November 25, by Netflix Music.

== Track listing ==
No.	Title	Length
1.	"Theme from Glass Onion"	1:53
2.	"The Puzzle Box"	2:12
3.	"Andi's Theme"	2:00
4.	"An Anonymous Invitation"	1:48
5.	"Ground Rules"	0:37
6.	"Ms. Birdie Jay"	1:47
7.	"The Infraction Point"	1:12
8.	"Dinner Is Served"	1:30
9.	"This Is Not a Game"	1:53
10.	"The Scene of the Crime"	2:16
11.	"Trapped"	2:52
12.	"Lights Out!"	2:02
13.	"Time to Finish This"	2:05
14.	"Blanc's Plan"	2:57
15.	"Snoop"	1:44
16.	"Motive & Opportunity"	1:13
17.	"Something's Off"	1:18
18.	"Perjury"	3:51
19.	"Ransacking"	3:26
20.	"A.B."	2:54
21.	"The Center of the Onion"	4:11
22.	"Peeled Back"	2:31
23.	"You've Got Nothing"	3:53
24.	"Glass Onion (String Quartet in Bb Minor)"	2:15
25.	"Burnt"	1:51
26.	"Disruption"	1:43
27.	"Theme from Glass Onion (Revisited)"	2:00

== Reception ==
J. Don Birnam of Below the Line wrote Nathan Johnson "delivers another playful, mysterious, and exciting score". Chris Bumbray of JoBlo.com said "The score by Nathan Johnson is excellent and peppered with some unique needle drops". Writing for Filmspeak, Arjun Persaud said "Nathan Johnson's score also adds to the narrative thrills, with a delightfully apt array of melodies that accentuate all the film's key twists and turns." Jericho Tadeo of MovieWeb wrote Johnson's "sweeping score amplifies the stakes that are at play". Maggie Dela Paz of Comingsoon.net wrote "Nathan Johnson's score references the manor mystery of Knives Out, but the sonic palette is both expanded and inverted with a new quartet joining brass and harpsichord to flesh out the romantic themes of an entirely new mystery." Cameron Frew of Dexerto wrote "Nathan Johnson's score is luscious, swooning, reminiscent of John Barry's more sweeping compositions, but increasingly energetic and jagged as the mystery develops." Martin Tsai of TheWrap wrote "The moment Nathan Johnson's score inexplicably drops out, the air is noticeably dead."
