= Glass onion =

Large hand-blown glass bottle

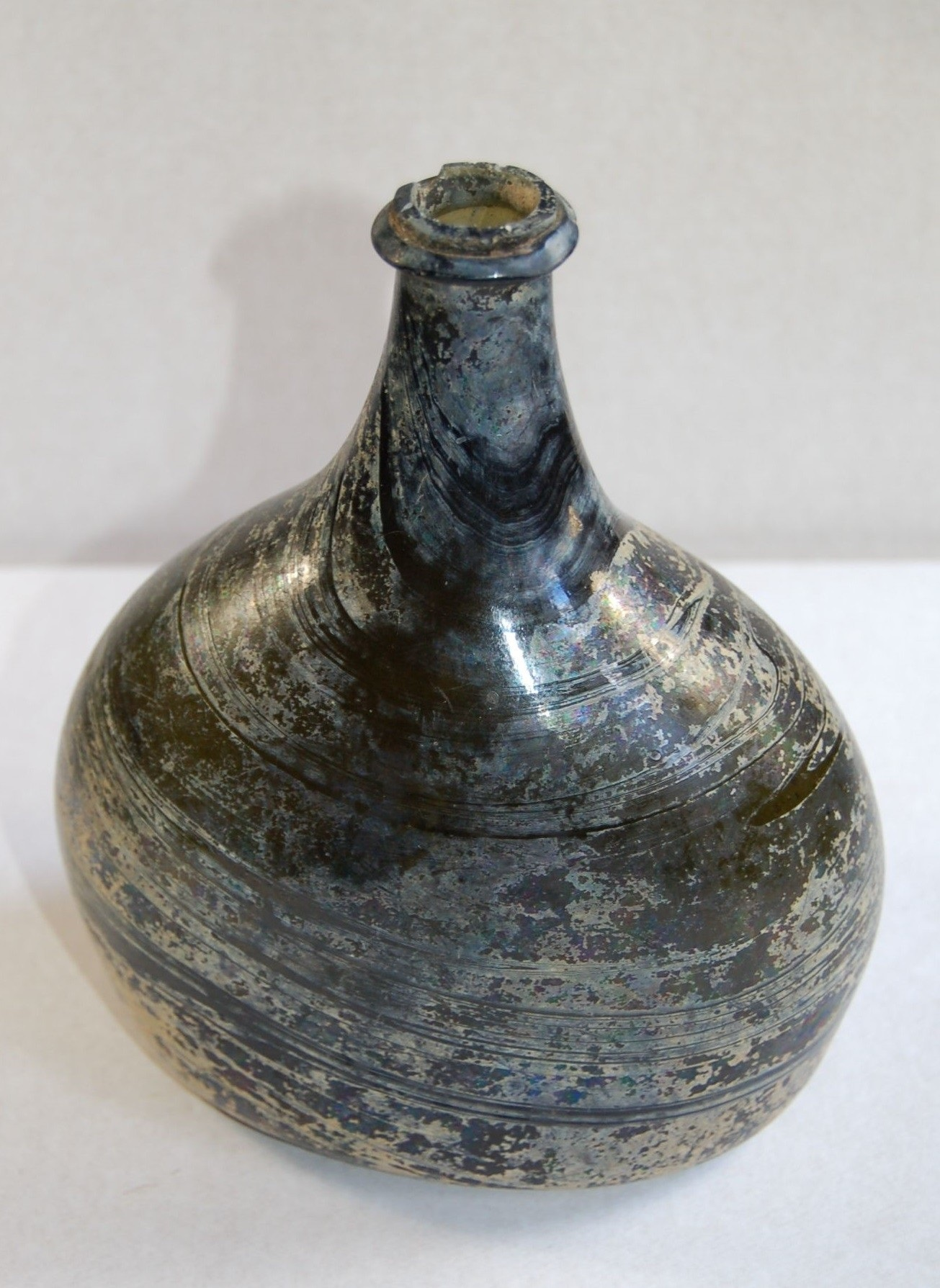
A 1700s glass onion bottle

Glass onions or onion bottles, were a shape of bottle developed and used during the 17th and 18th centuries. With new techniques of glass-making, the bottles marked a move away from ceramic pottery.

== Background ==
Onion bottles most commonly were used to hold wine, but were also used for spirits. At the beginning of the 17th-century wine bottles were small and thin-walled, making them difficult to store and ship. The onion bottle was created to solve this, made possible by the invention of hotter furnaces in the early 17th century.

During the 1630s, privateer turned inventor Kenelm Digby teamed up with James Howell, creating a method of making stronger glass with hotter furnaces. Digby owned a glassworks that made bottles which were globular in shape with a high, tapered neck, a collar, and a punt. His manufacturing technique involved a coal furnace, made hotter than usual by the inclusion of a wind tunnel, and a higher ratio of sand to potash and lime than was customary. Digby's technique produced wine bottles which were stronger and more stable than most of their day, and protected the contents from light due to their green or brown translucent, rather than clear transparent, color.

These early bottles, usually referred to as "shaft and globe" bottles, evolved into the onion bottle shape by the 1670s. This shape gradually evolved to be stouter with a broad base and short neck by the end of the 17th century, then became elongated during the onset of the 18th century. Onion bottles were dark green or brown from iron oxide found within the sand used to make them. The color was further darkened by the coal used to heat the furnaces, leaving the bottles almost black. Collars were applied to the tops for corks to be tied down. When shipped, they would be laid on their sides to soak the cork and help prevent oxidation of the wine. Spirits such as brandy were also added to the wine to extend its life when shipping overseas.

== Gallery ==
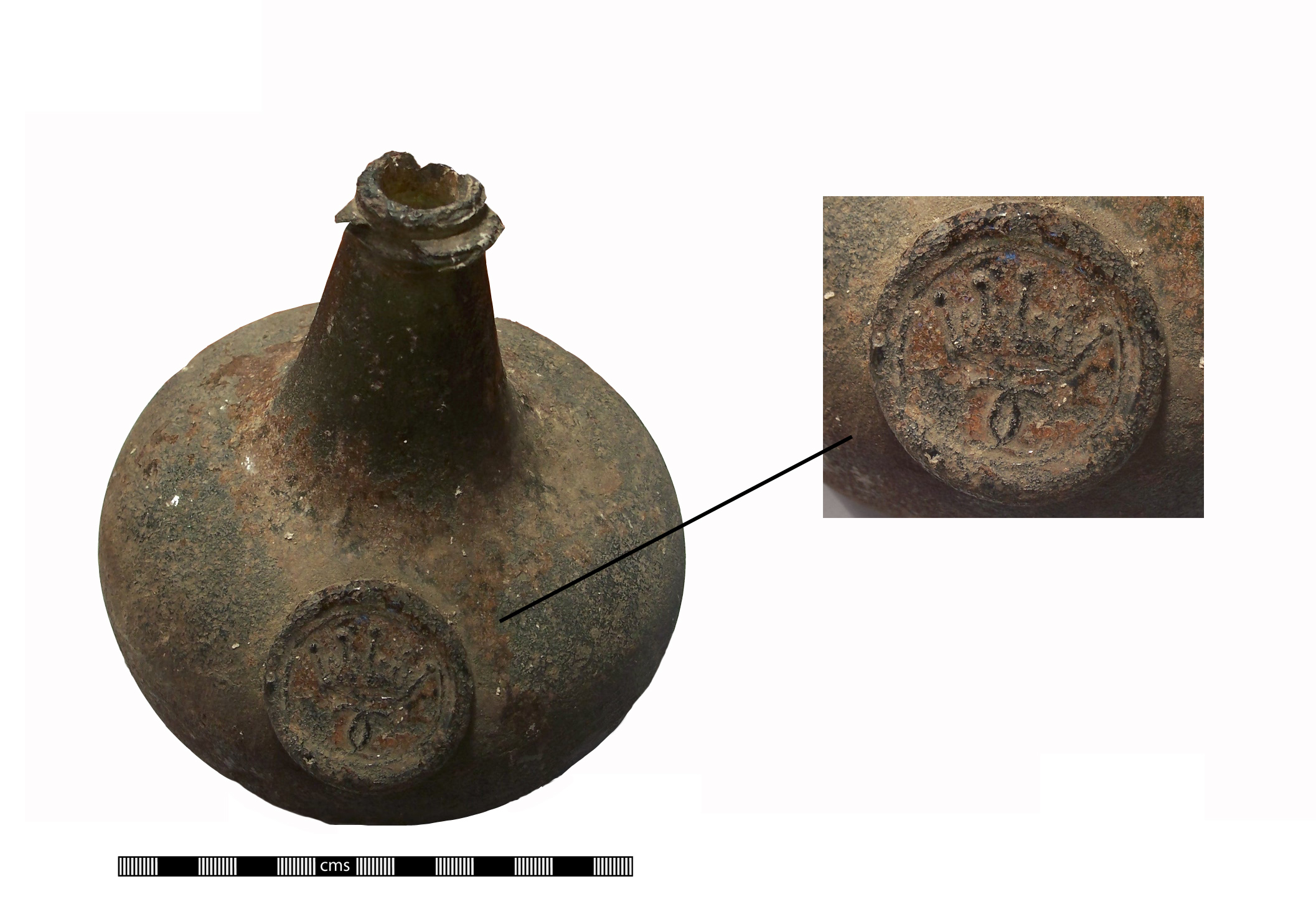
Onion bottle circa 1680 and 1700

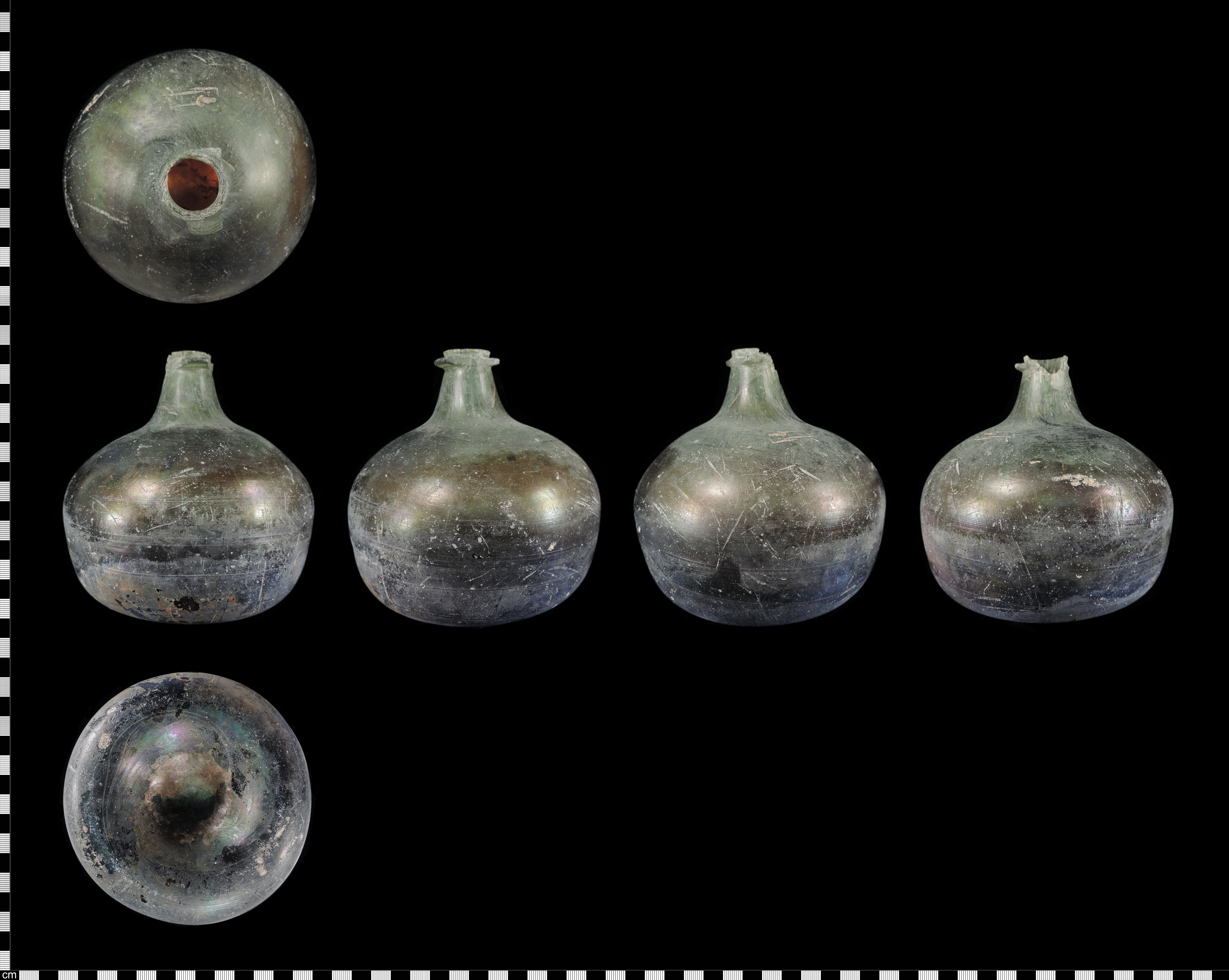
Onion bottle circa 1690–1700

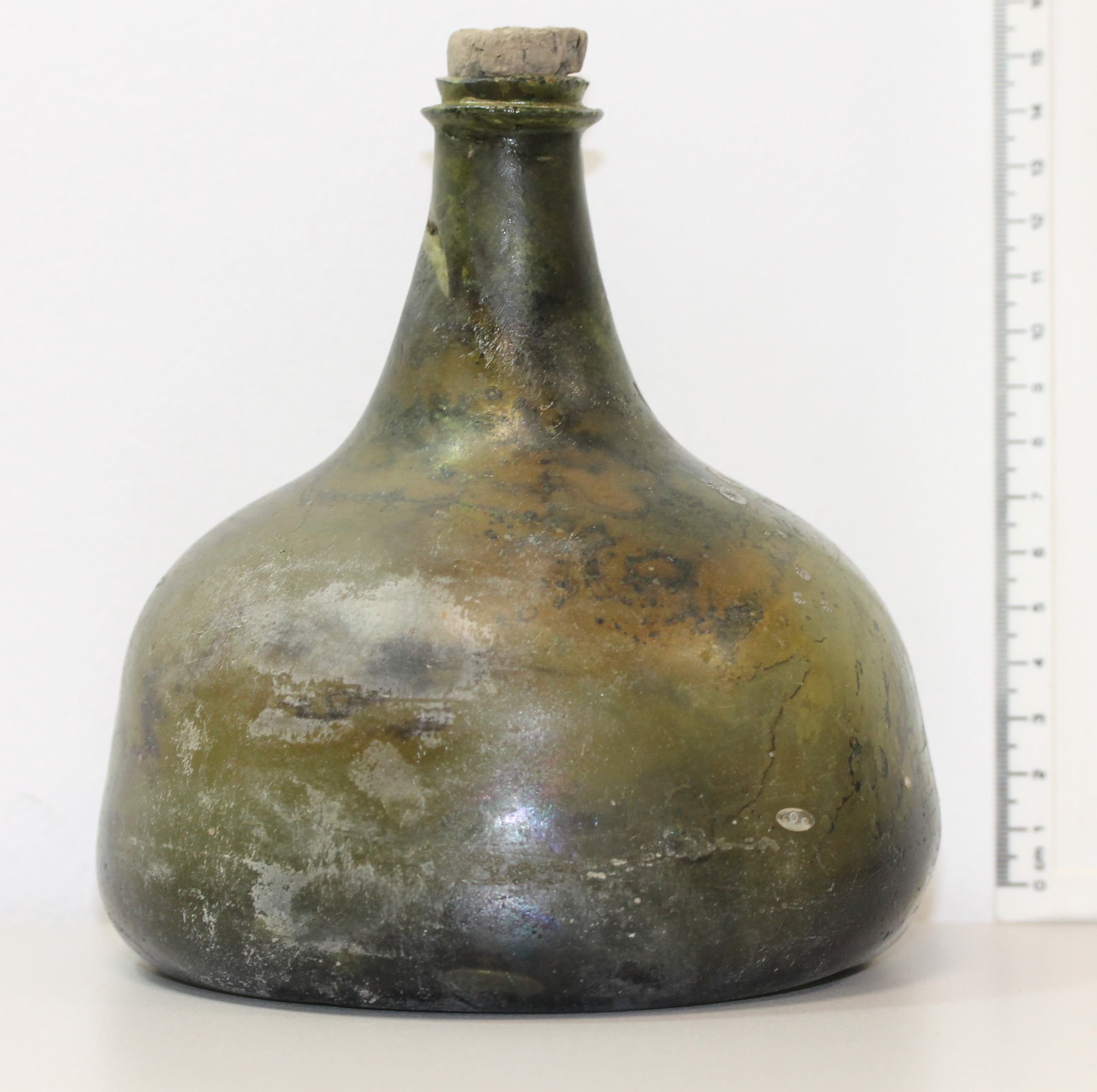
Onion bottle circa 1700 and 1750
