= John Landis Mason =

American tinsmith and inventor

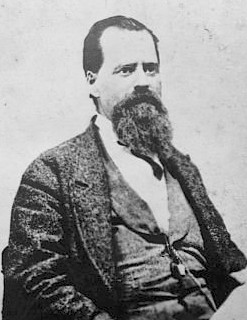
John L. Mason

John Landis Mason (c. 1832 in Vineland, New Jersey – February 26, 1902) was an American tinsmith and the patentee of the metal screw-on lid for antique fruit jars commonly known as Mason jars. Many such jars were printed with the line "Mason's Patent Nov 30th 1858". He also invented the first screw top salt shaker in 1858.

== Context ==
Before the development of refrigeration and hothouse gardens, many fruits and vegetables were available only seasonally. From the 1830s, the development of glass jars made canning a practical alternative to drying, pickling, or smoking to preserve food. Unfortunately, the mouth of the jar was unthreaded, across which a round, flat tin lid was laid and sealed with wax. The canning procedure was messy, unreliable, and unsafe – if the wax was not applied properly, it allowed bacteria to thrive in the jar. Mason's innovation was a square-shouldered jar with threaded screw-top, matching lid, and rubber ring for an airtight seal.

Mason's easy-to-use, re-usable jars made home canning popular among American settlers, homesteaders, and even in urban homes. Most Mason jars were manufactured by competitors after his patent expired in 1879.

== Personal life ==
He was married and had eight children, six surviving to adulthood. He died in poverty in a tenement house in New York City in 1902.

== Patents ==
United States patent 22,186, dated November 30, 1858, is primarily on the use of exterior threads in the jar and a corresponding metal cap. Later patents such as Nr.102,913 improved upon this in various ways such as the addition of rubber rings.

- U.S. patent 22,186.
- U.S. patent 102,913.

In the case of the United States Supreme Court, 94 U.S. 92 (1876), CONSOLIDATED FRUIT-JAR COMPANY v. WRIGHT, the Court ruled that Mason's patent had been abandoned to the public.
