= Gilhooly =

Gilhooley, Gilhoolie or Gilhooly may refer to:

Gilhooley

- Frank Gilhooley (1892-1959), American baseball player
- Maria Gilhooley, singer
- Ray Gilhooley (1887-1973), American racecar driver

Gilhooly

- Brenda Gilhooly (born 1964), English comedian
- David Gilhooly (1943–2013), American ceramic artist
- James Gilhooly (1847-1916), Irish Nationalist politician

Gilhoolie

- Gilhoolie, a jar opener
