= Weck jar =

German brand of canning jar

Weck jars showing glass tops, rubber seals, and tension clips

Weck jar logo

A Weck jar is a glass jar used in home canning to preserve food. It has a rubber gasket with a glass lid.

== History ==
The jars were invented and patented by Rudolph Rempel. Johann Carl Weck purchased the patent from Rempel, and in 1900 Weck and his best salesman, George Van Eyck, founded the J. WECK Company in Germany. In 1902, Weck left the company, and Van Eyck continued to improve the design and function of the jar and started exporting the jars outside of Germany. He trademarked the name WECK, and his strawberry logo is still used today.

== The jar ==
The glass jars come in a variety of shapes and sizes and have rubber seals, glass lids, and stainless steel clips.

Food is processed in Weck jars using the water bath canning technique, not pressure canners. During the canning process the lids are secured by the clips, which can be removed once the processing is complete and the jars have cooled, with the lids being forced shut by atmospheric pressure. A correctly sealed jar is indicated when the tab of the rubber seal points downward.

== See also ==
- Home canning
- Sterilization (microbiology)
- Other canning jar types/brands:
  - Fowler's Vacola
  - Kilner jar
  - Mason jar
  - Le Parfait
