= Sanage Kiln =

Historic kiln in Japan

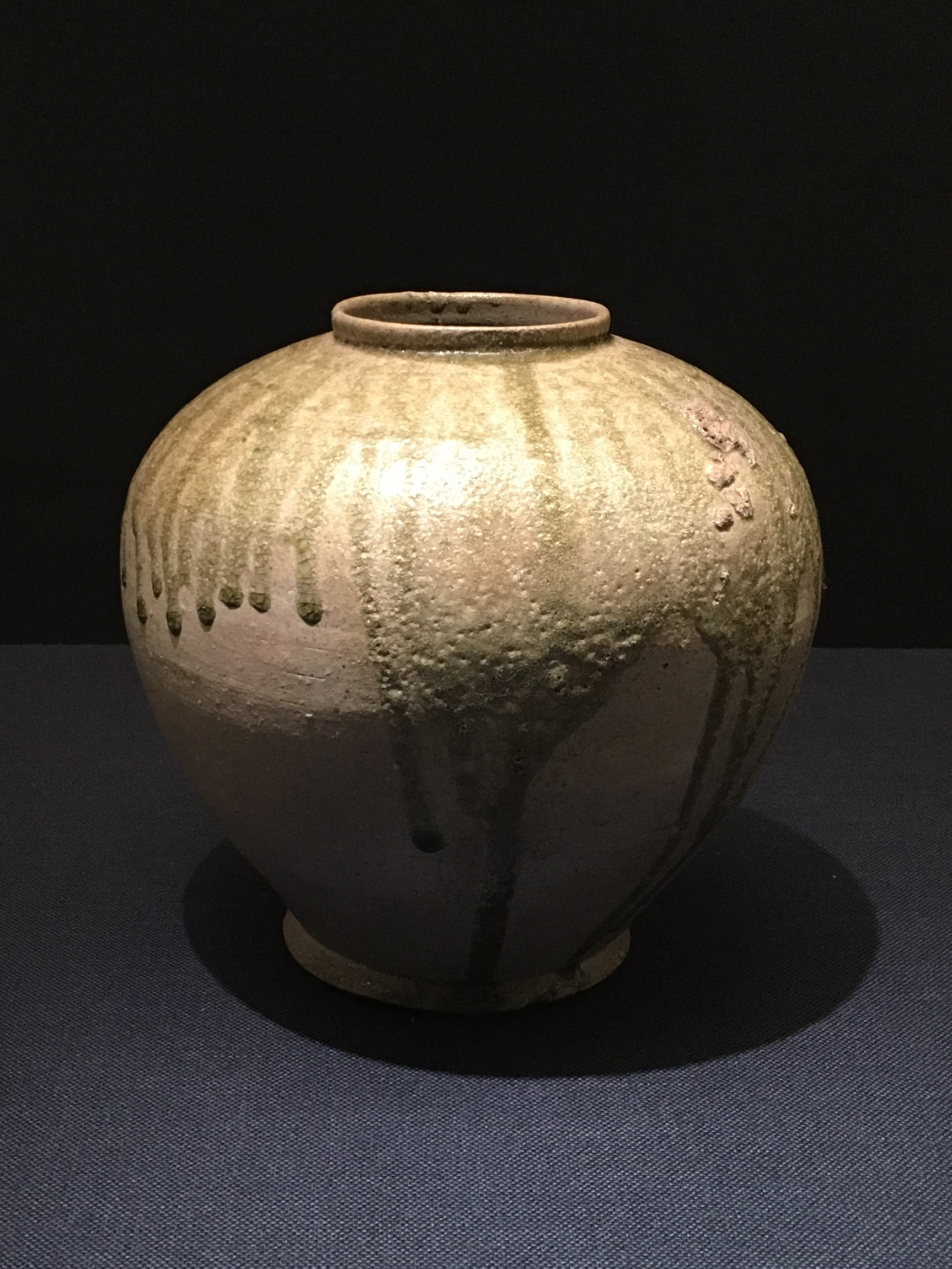
Sanage jar with short neck, ash glaze. Early Heian period, 9th century (Important Cultural Property of Aichi prefecture)

The Sanage Kiln (猿投窯 Sanageyō) is a generic name for a historic kiln dating back over 1,000 years. It is located about 20 km west of Toyota in the east of Aichi prefecture.

Ash glazed pottery developed from the 9th century from high temperature fire burning. Ash glazed pottery was distributed throughout the Japanese archipelago as a domestic, high-class ceramic.
