= Jar =

Rigid, approximately cylindrical container with a wide mouth or opening

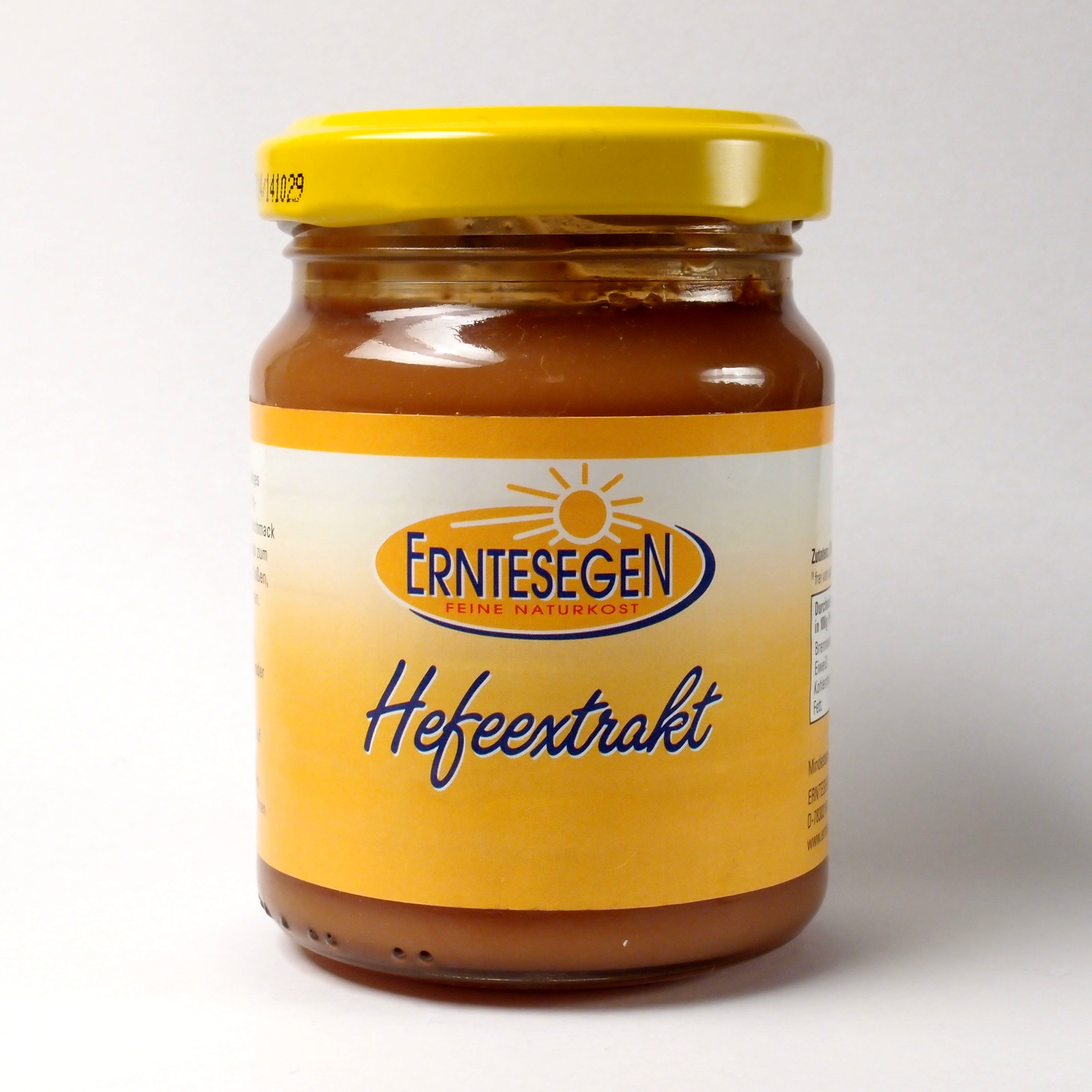
A jar of yeast extract.

Candy jar, by Christian Dorflinger, 1869–1880, glass, diameter: 12.1 cm, Cleveland Museum of Art (USA)

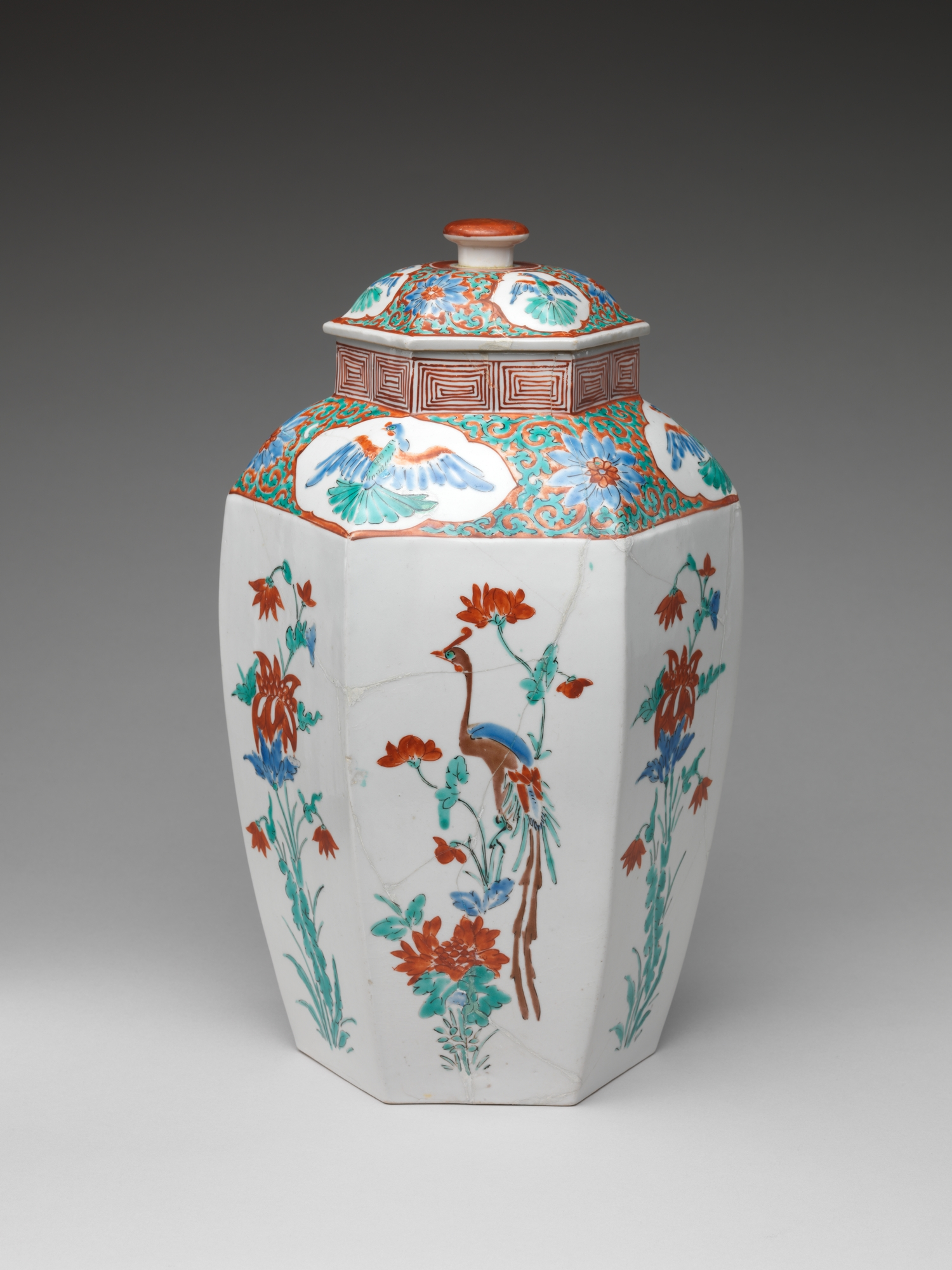
Hexagonal jar decorated with flowers and birds, late 17th century, porcelain with overglaze enamels, height: 31.1 cm, diameter: 19.1 cm, Metropolitan Museum of Art (New York City)

A jar is a rigid, cylindrical, or slightly conical container, typically made of glass, ceramic, or plastic, with a wide mouth or opening that can be closed with a lid, screw cap, lug cap, cork stopper, roll-on cap, crimp-on cap, press-on cap, plastic shrink, heat-sealed lidding film, an inner seal, a tamper-evident band, or other suitable means. The English word "jar" originates from the Arabic word jarra, which means an earthen pot or vessel.

== Background ==
Jars can be used to hold solids too large to be removed from, or liquids too viscous to be poured through a bottle's neck; these may be foods, cosmetics, medications, or chemicals. Glass jars—among which the most popular is the mason jar—can be used for storing and preserving items as diverse as jam, pickled gherkin, other pickles, marmalade, sun-dried tomatoes, olives, jalapeño peppers, chutneys, pickled eggs, honey, and many others.

== Types ==
- Bell jar – typically used in scientific laboratories to produce a vacuum; also used in Victorian times for display purposes
- Cookie jar – typically ceramic or glass, common in the United States, Canada, and United Kingdom
- Killing jar – used to kill captured insects
- Leyden jar – a historical electrical capacitor
- Specimen jar – an instrument used in anatomy to preserve specimens
- Apothecary jar – historically for storage of medicines; made of ceramics or more typically in modern centuries, clear glass. Typically cylindrical or with rotationally symmetric decorative curves, sometimes with a glass disc foot separated from the main body. Modern glass versions are also used for artistic display of the contents.
- Economy round or wide mouth jars – tall but rotund cylinder slightly rounded at the top and bottom, relatively wide with a wide mouth, commonly used for sauces like a mayonnaise
- Paragon jars – tall and narrow cylinder, commonly used for pickled foods such as olives
- French square or Victorian jars – roughly a small cube
- Spice jars – small cylinder or rectangular cuboid
- Hexagon or hex jars – regular hexagonal prism
- Mason jars – moderately tall cylinder typically used in home canning, sealed with a metal lid
- Kilner jar – similar to a Mason jar but sealed with rubber
- Straight-sided jars – cylinders with no neck. Squat straight-sided jars are suitable for creams which can be scooped out.

Ancient ceramic types include

- Amphora – large, but typically holding under 50 L
- Pithos – very large, typically the size of a person and holding hundreds of liters, Pandora's Box is often referred to as Pithos
- Canopic jar

== Utility ==
Jars are sterilised by putting them in a pressure cooker with boiling water or an oven for a number of minutes. Glass jars are considered microwavable.

Some regions have a legally mandated deposit refundable upon return of the jar to its retailer, after which the jar is recycled according to the SPI recycling code for the material.

== See also ==
- Canning
- Home canning
- Child-resistant packaging
- Hu (vessel)
- Jug
- Jar opener
- Tamper-evident
- Tamper resistant
