= Jar opener =

Kitchen device

A jar opener is a kitchen device which is used to open glass or plastic jars. A jar is sealed by either (a) a screw-off rubberised lid or (b) a lid placed on the opening of the jar with a rubber sealing-ring between. Screw-off lids are usually made of metal with a thin rubber sealing layer, whereas lift-off lids mostly consist of glass.

== Types ==
=== Screw-off lids ===
A traditional jar opener for a screw-off lid will have two handles, leading up to two concentric grooved rings which can be used to fit different lids. It sometimes incorporates a bottle opener. There are many models, including rubber sheet grip models (called "rounds") and rubber timing belt loop models. Rounds are common promotional items, and mechanically the simplest type of jar opener.

=== Lift-off lids ===
Jar openers designed to wedge open a lid sealed by a rubber ring were patented and produced in Germany in the mid 1930s, but all production has halted following the turn of the century. On the far below right is an example of a wooden vintage jar opener for fruit preserve jars, which must be air tight to prevent food spoilage.

=== Motorised jar openers ===
Black & Decker produced the first automatic jar opener in 2003.

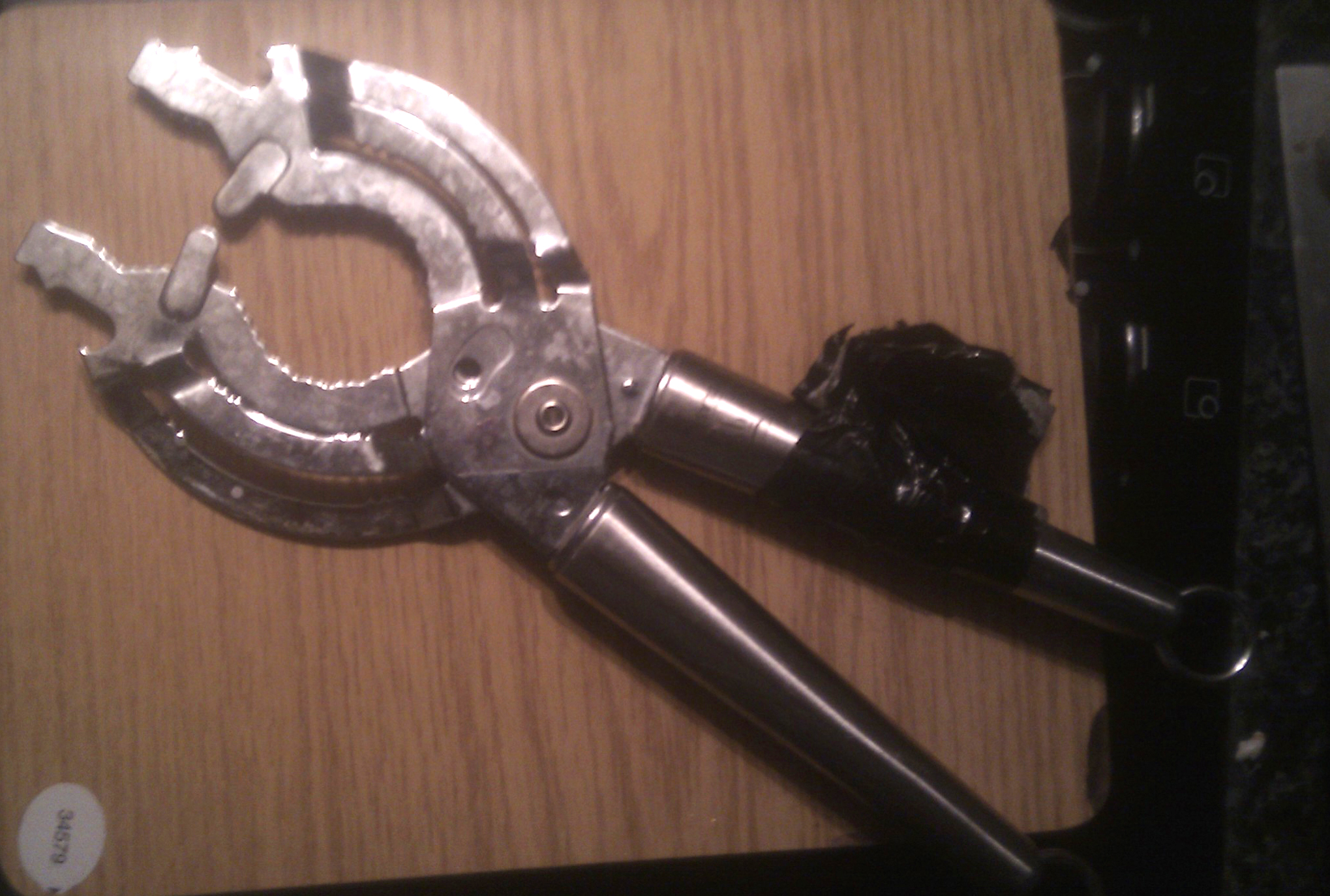
An intricate metal jar opener

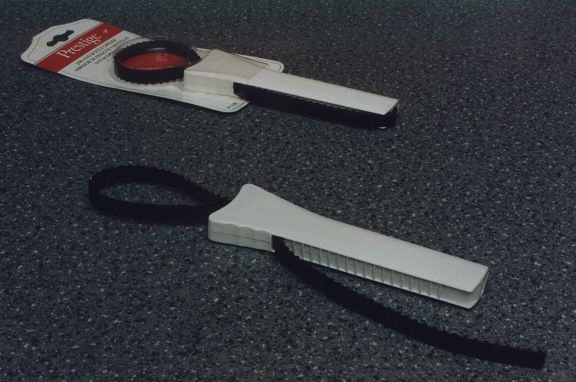
Polyurethane timing belt jar opener

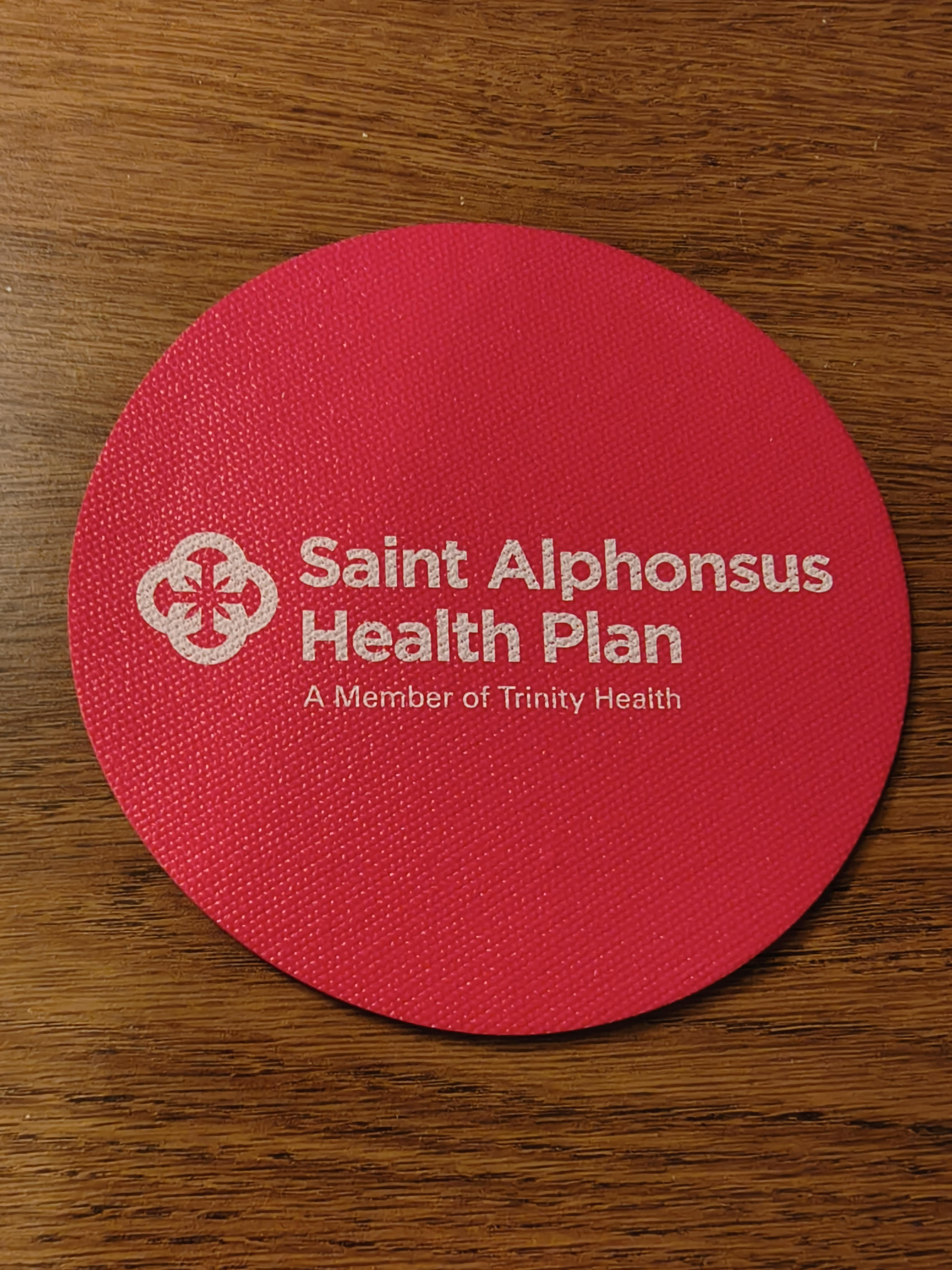
Medical insurance promotional item

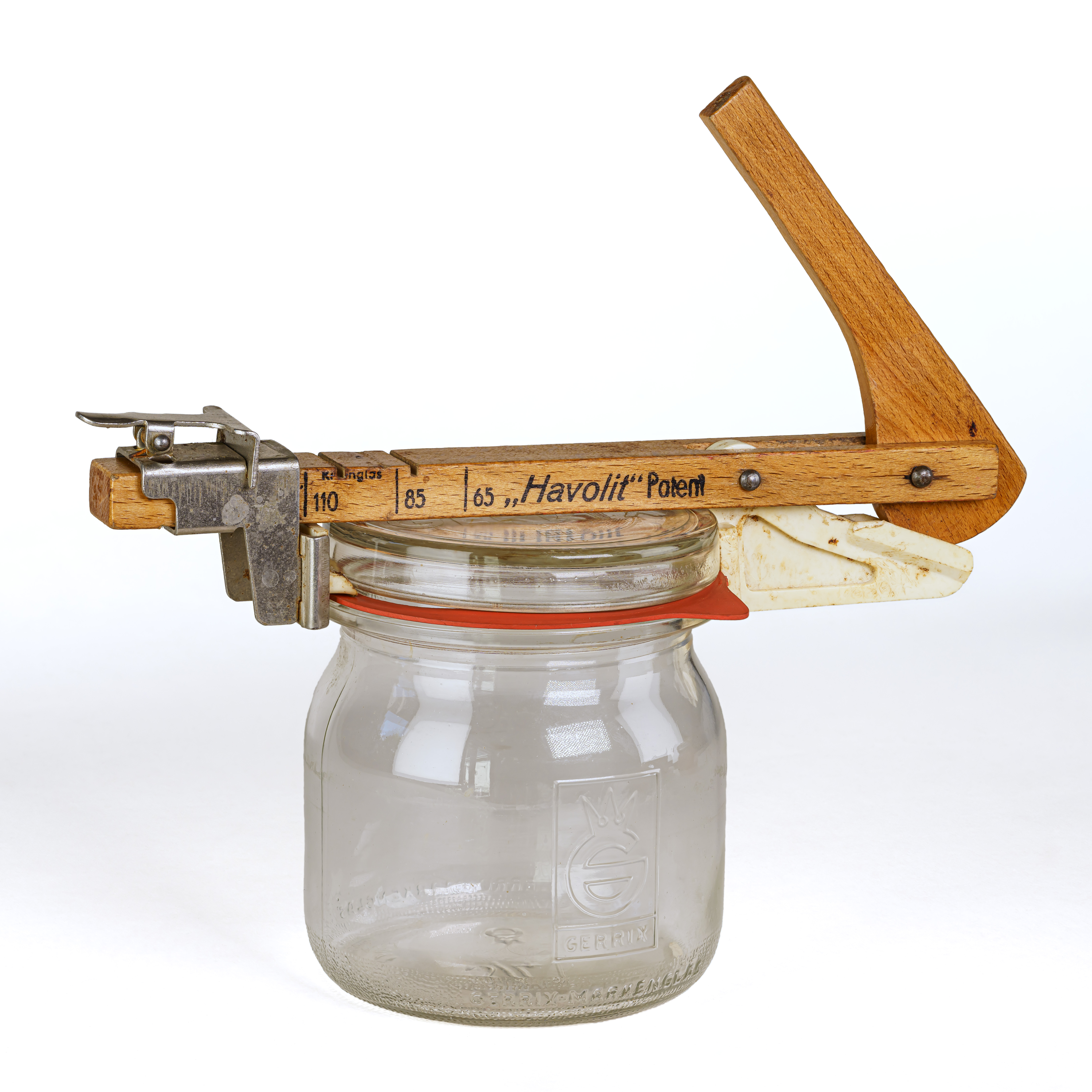
Jar opener for preserving jar with lift-off lid - patented by Havolit, manufactured in 1950s

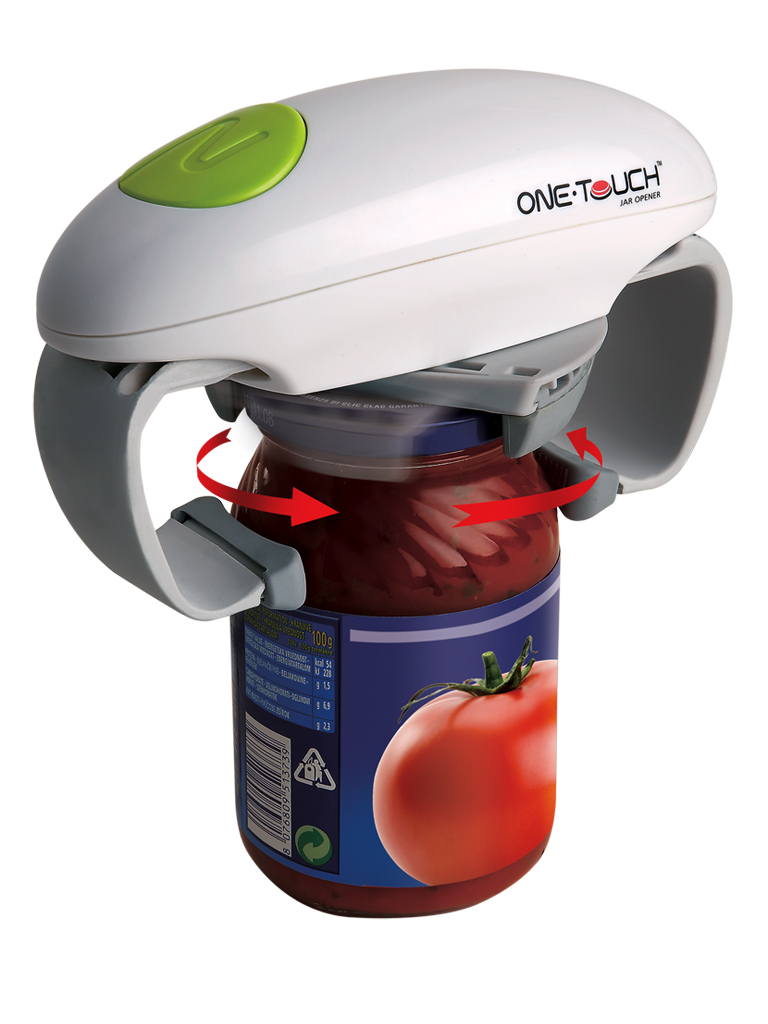
Award-winning automatic jar opener

== Reasons for use ==
Some people with smaller hands cannot readily remove the lids of some glass jars, lacking either sufficient strength and/or leverage. Some people with disabilities simply cannot open a jar, while others simply prefer the ease that comes with a jar opener.

== See also ==
- Gilhoolie
