= Ravenhead Glass =

Former glassworks in Lancashire, England

Ravenhead Glass was a glassworks near Ravenhead Colliery, Lancashire, North West England. It was founded in 1850 by Frances Dixon and John Merson after a move from their earlier (1842) factory at Thatto Heath near St Helens. In 1852, this factory was sold to the Pilkington Brothers and Frances Dixon then acquired a 13-acre (53,000 m^{2}) site at Ravenhead, building a new gas-powered glassworks.

In 1913 the company merged with five other glass manufacturers, forming UGB (United Glass Bottle Manufacturers Limited).

Until 1931 these companies were primarily bottle makers but they branched out into domestic tableware in the 1930s making bowls, jugs and drinking glasses, many of these showing Art Deco influences.

From 1947, Alexander Hardie Williamson (1907–1994) was employed as consultant designer and during the 27 years he was with the company, he created over 1,700 designs. Some of these were produced in their millions for public houses and restaurants and included the Paris goblet, the Nonik beer mug and the Babycham-style Champagne glass. He also designed a range of tableware, the Kilner jar and a collectable range of decorated tumblers. In 1972 Alexander Williamson retired.

Until 1972 the company had been called United Glass Tableware Ltd, but in that year Ronald Andrew Murphy was recruited from BOC's Sparklets Division to develop and market the retail business. A marketer with strong brand and product design expertise, he initiated the company name change to The Ravenhead Company Ltd.

The retail range was rapidly expanded initially using John Clappison an existing freelance designer (John designed Barmasters, Elegance, White Fire, Topaz, Icelantic, Olympiad etc. and also refined and developed Hardie Williamson's Siesta range). Ronald Murphy also arranged the sponsoring and formation of The Glassshouse in Covent Garden in conjunction with the Royal College of Art. Notable was Annette Meech (who designed the RosyTumblers, Apollo and Solar range for Ravenhead). Design awards followed and several products were featured in the London Design Centre.

Until 1972 automatic soda lime glass had been largely sold through hardware stores. Ravenhead's new research programme indicated that ladies were responsible for 80% of purchases for the home.As a result, marketing of the retail range was accelerated by packing glass in attractive boxes and marketing through supermarkets, such as Tesco, where its non-food division was still in relative infancy.

Within three years from formation of the Retail Division, it moved from a negligible retail market share to approximately 40% of the UK market with significant exports to markets as diverse as Scandinavia, Japan and Australia. Particularly notable products were the Siesta textured range and the White Fire bowl sets; one year, the latter achieved the remarkable levels of one in every two bowl sets sold in the UK.

Following a downturn in the company's fortunes (and various changes of ownership) in the late 1980s, it went into administration in 2001 and the factory closed. There followed an investigation by the Serious Fraud Office, following reference to it by Merseyside Police, but it was closed for lack of sufficient evidence.

In 2003 the Rayware Group of Liverpool relaunched it, giving pint pots and other traditional glasses the Ravenhead name.
