= Fowler's Vacola =

Molded glass jar used in canning for food preservation

The Fowler's Vacola jar is a glass jar used in canning for food preservation. It is the most popular home canning system in Australia.

== History ==
The system was developed in 1915 in Melbourne, Australia, by Joseph Fowler (28 February 1888 – 24 April 1972), who migrated from England in 1912, at his home in Hawthorn, Victoria, and became very popular.

== The jar ==
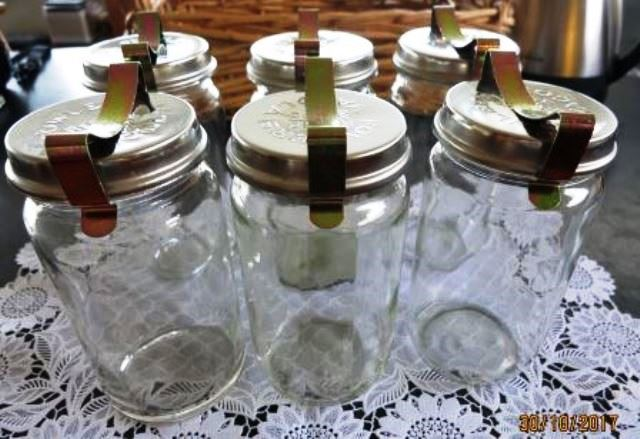
Fowlers Vacola jars

The Fowler's Vacola system uses glass jars, single-use rubber ring seals and pressed metal lids, much like American Mason jars, first patented in 1858, except that the jars and lids are not threaded. During the canning process, while still hot (and presumably sterile), the lids are secured by metal tension clips, which are removed once cooled, after a vacuum seal has formed.

Other equipment marketed by the company included a large electrically heated waterbath and "sterilizing thermometer", a glass thermometer mounted on a concave stainless steel backing, graduated in both Celsius and Fahrenheit.

=== Availability ===
Fowler's Vacola products are still produced by the original Fowlers Vacola company, and they are available from some hardware stores and directly from the company via their online store. Used equipment is frequently sold on online auction sites and in opportunity shops.

== The company ==
Fowlers Vacola specialises in bottling jams and other foods at its manufacturing plant in Sydney.

== See also ==
- Kilner jar
- Screw cap
- Sterilization (microbiology)
- Weck jar
