= Gilhoolie =

Jar opener

The Gilhoolie jar opener invented by Dr. C. W. Fuller

The Gilhoolie is a kitchen appliance that opens jars and bottles. It was invented by Dr. Charles W. Fuller, a retired dentist from Yonkers, New York.

The Gilhoolie debuted in 1953. Fuller applied for a United States patent on the Gilhoolie, identified as a "cam operated sliding jaw closure remover", in 1952, and the patent was granted in 1954. Although Fuller held more than a dozen patents in the fields of dentistry and golf, the Gilhoolie patent was his only patent for a kitchen device.

For several years, the Gilhoolie was sold through mail order by the Riswell Company of Cos Cob, Greenwich, Connecticut.

== See also ==
- Jar opener
