= Kilner jar =

British brand of home bottling jar

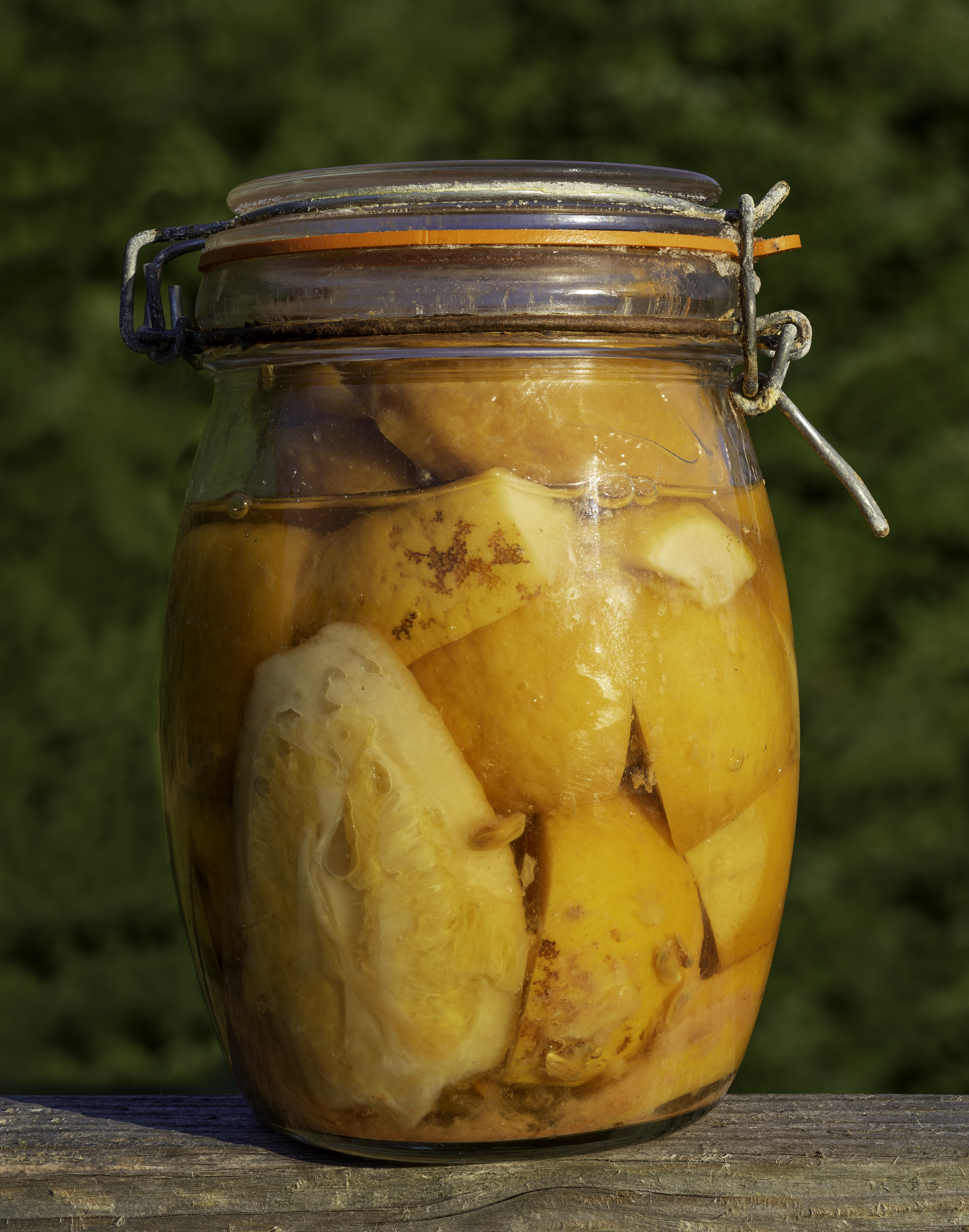
Kilner jar with rubber seal

A Kilner jar is a rubber-sealed glass jar used for preserving (bottling) food. It was first produced by John Kilner & Co., Yorkshire, England.

== History ==
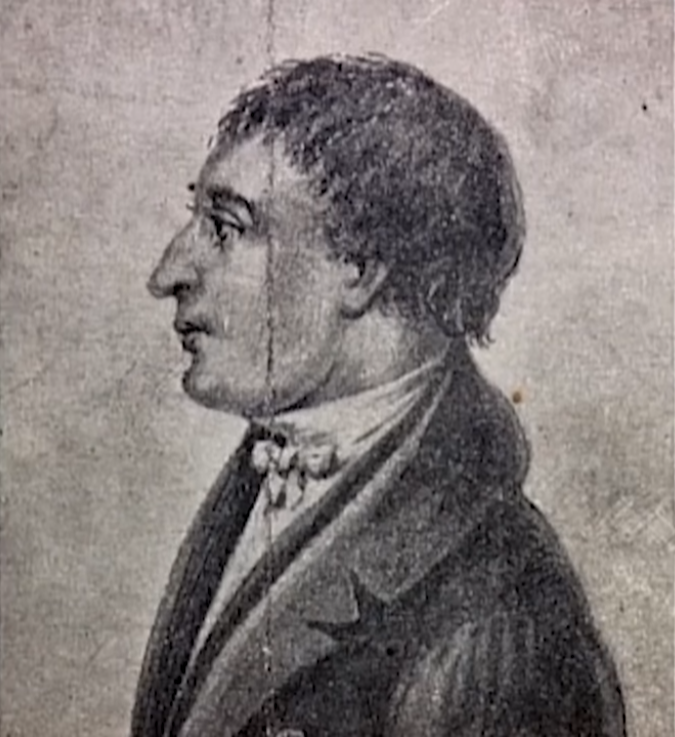
John Kilner (1792–1857), namesake and inventor of the Kilner Jar

The Kilner Jar was invented by John Kilner (1792–1857) and associates and manufactured by the Kilner glass bottlemakers company from Yorkshire, which he set up. The original Kilner bottlemakers operated from 1842, when the company was first founded, until 1937, when the company went into liquidation.

In 2003, The Rayware Group purchased the Ravenhead name, including Kilner jar (a subsidiary of Ravenhead), and continues to produce them today in China.

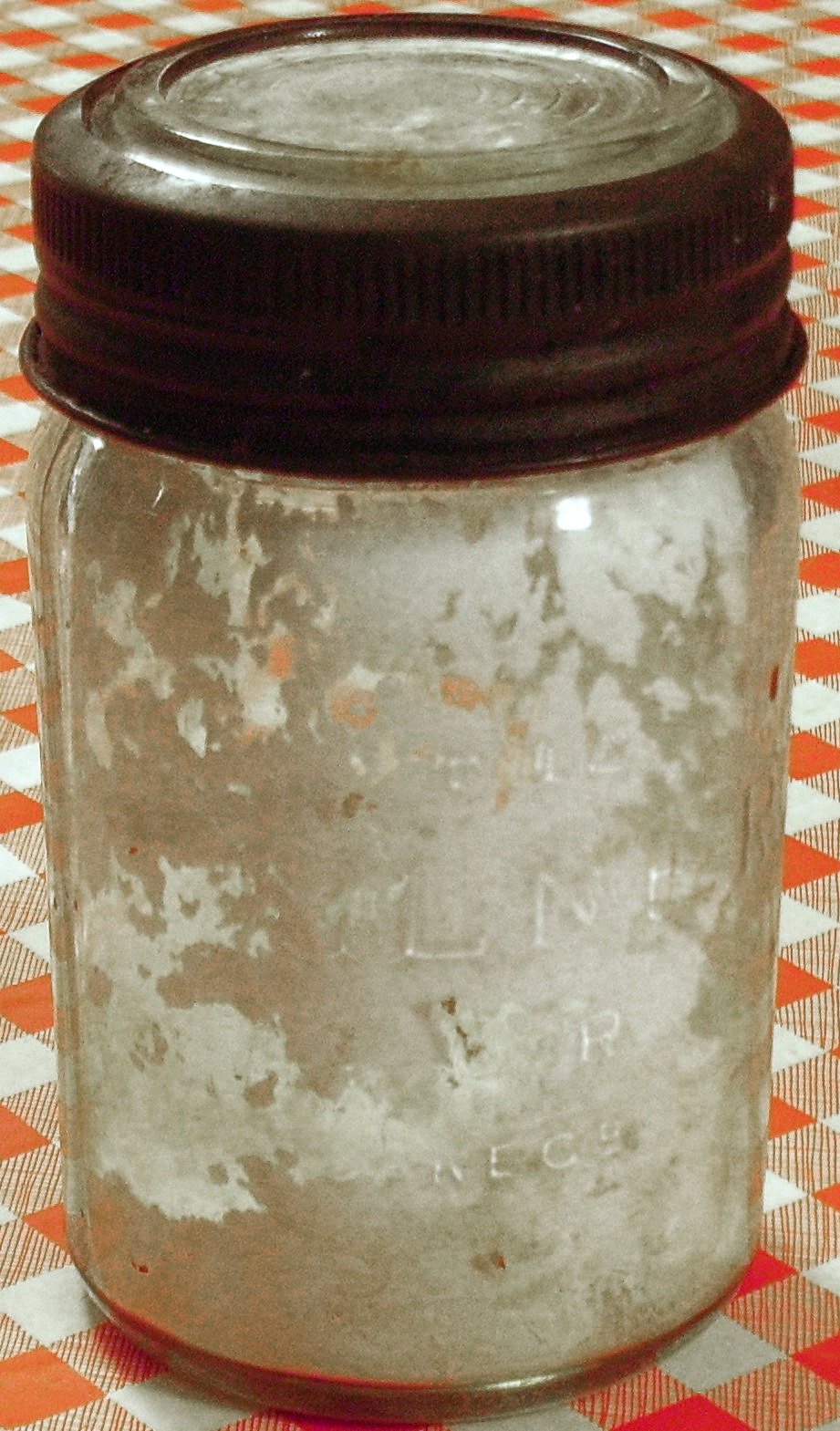
A Kilner jar from no later than 1928

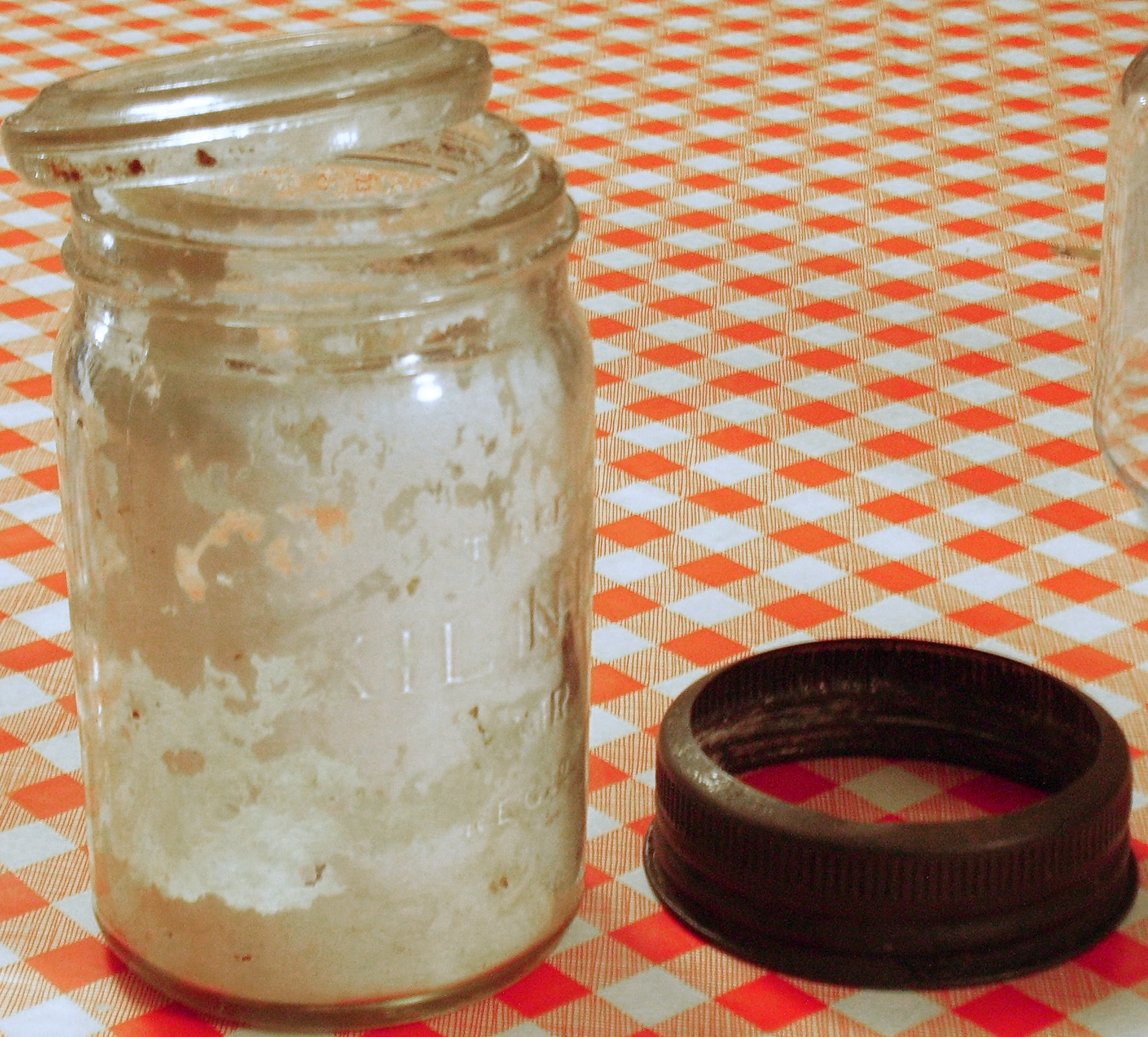
The open jar

== Company names ==
The various names of the Kilner companies were:

- John Kilner and Co, Castleford, Yorkshire, 1842–1844
- John Kilner and Sons, Wakefield, Yorkshire, 1847–1857
- Kilner Brothers Glass Co, Thornhill Lees, Yorkshire, 1857–1873 also at Conisbrough, Yorkshire, 1863–1873
- Kilner Brothers Ltd, Thornhill Lees, Yorkshire 1873–1920 also at Conisbrough, Yorkshire, 1873–1937.

== See also ==
- Mason jar
- Weck jar
- Fowler's Vacola jar
- Food preservation
- Home canning
- Screw cap
- Sterilisation
