= Mason jar =

Glass jar used at home to preserve food

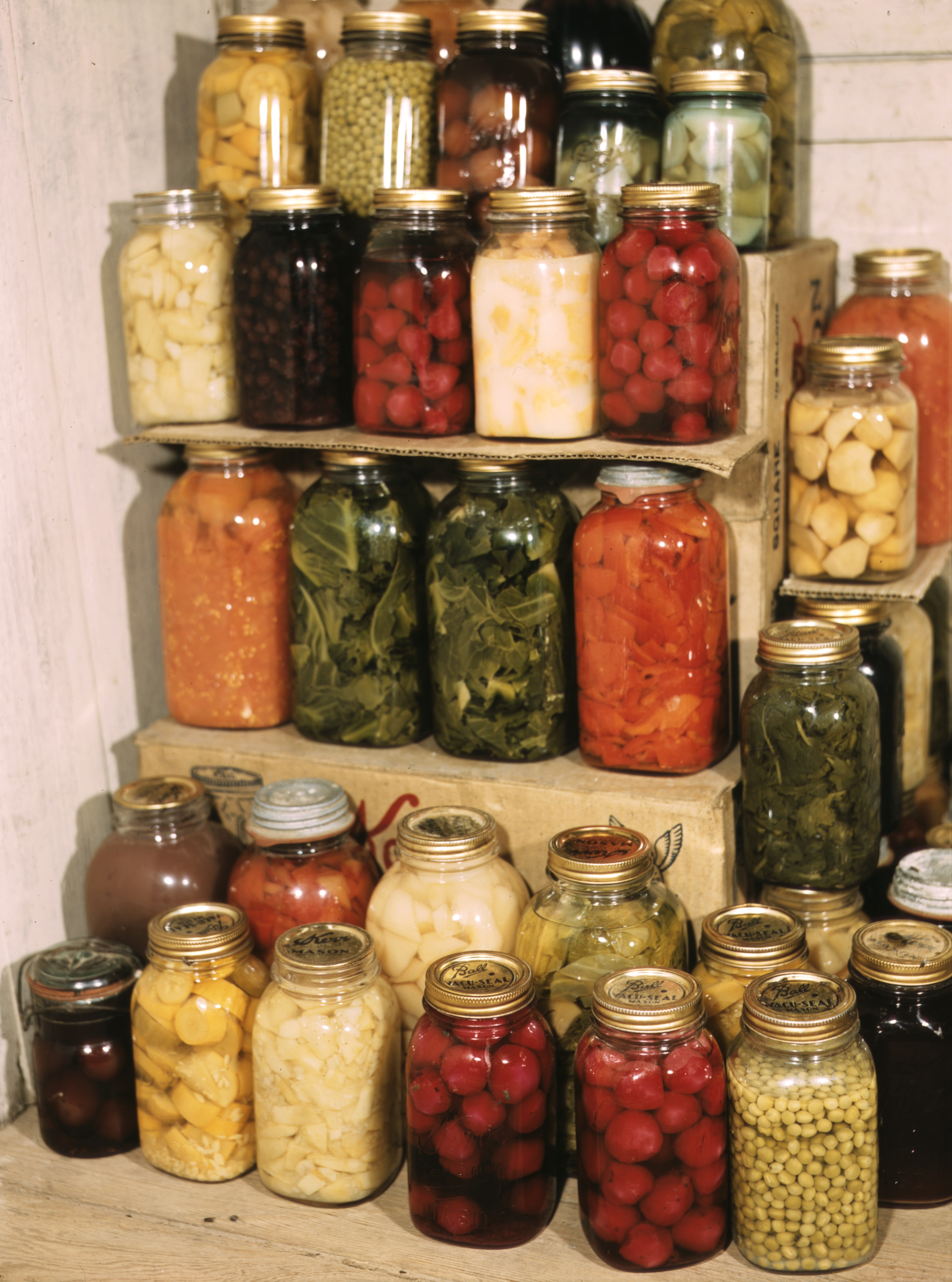
A collection of Mason jars filled with preserved foods

A Mason jar, also known as a canning jar, preserves jar or fruit jar, is a glass jar used in home canning to preserve food. It was named after American tinsmith John Landis Mason, who patented it in 1867. The jar's mouth has a screw thread on its outer perimeter to accept a metal ring, or band. The band, when screwed down, presses a separate stamped steel disc-shaped lid against the jar's rim.

After Mason's patent expired, numerous other companies began manufacturing similar jars. Over the years, the brand name Mason became the genericized trademark for this style of glass home canning jar, and the word Mason can be seen on many Ball and Kerr brand jars. Such jars are occasionally referred to using common brand names such as in Ball jar (in the eastern US) and Kerr jar (in the western US), regardless of their actual brands.

Glass canning jars provided a safe, reliable, and economical way to preserve all sorts of foodstuffs for later use and became an essential part of farming culture and home food storage, and preserved foods were displayed at county fairs for judging and awards. The peak use of Mason jars came during World War II, when the U.S. government rationed food, encouraging the public to grow their own. As migration to cities occurred, along with the rise of electrical refrigeration, the more efficient transport of goods made fruit and vegetables available year-round, reducing the need for home canning.

On August 15, 2017, the registrar at National Day Calendar proclaimed National Mason Jar Day, to be observed annually as a national holiday on November 30, beginning in 2017.

== History ==
=== Before Mason ===
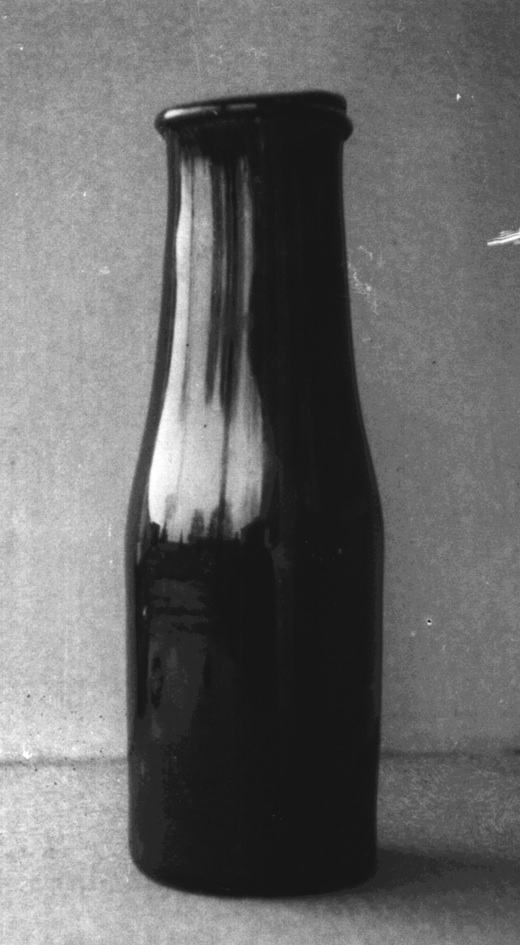
Nicolas Appert's jar

French chef Nicolas Appert invented the method of preserving food by enclosing it in sealed containers. Among the earliest glass jars used for home canning were wax sealers, named in reference to the sealing wax that was poured into a channel around the lip to secure a tin lid. This process, though complicated and error-prone, became popular in the late 1830s or early 1840s and was still used to seal fruit jars until about 1890. The wax sealing process was largely the only one available until other sealing methods were developed.

=== John Landis Mason ===
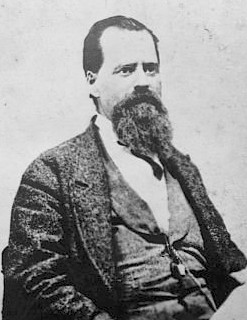
John Landis Mason, inventor of the Mason jar

In 1858, a Vineland, New Jersey tinsmith named John Landis Mason (1832–1902) invented and patented a screw-threaded glass jar or bottle that became known as the Mason jar (U.S. patent no. 22,186.) From when it was first patented Mason jars have had hundreds of variations in shape and cap design. After Mason's patent expired, many other manufacturers produced glass jars for home canning using the Mason-style jar.

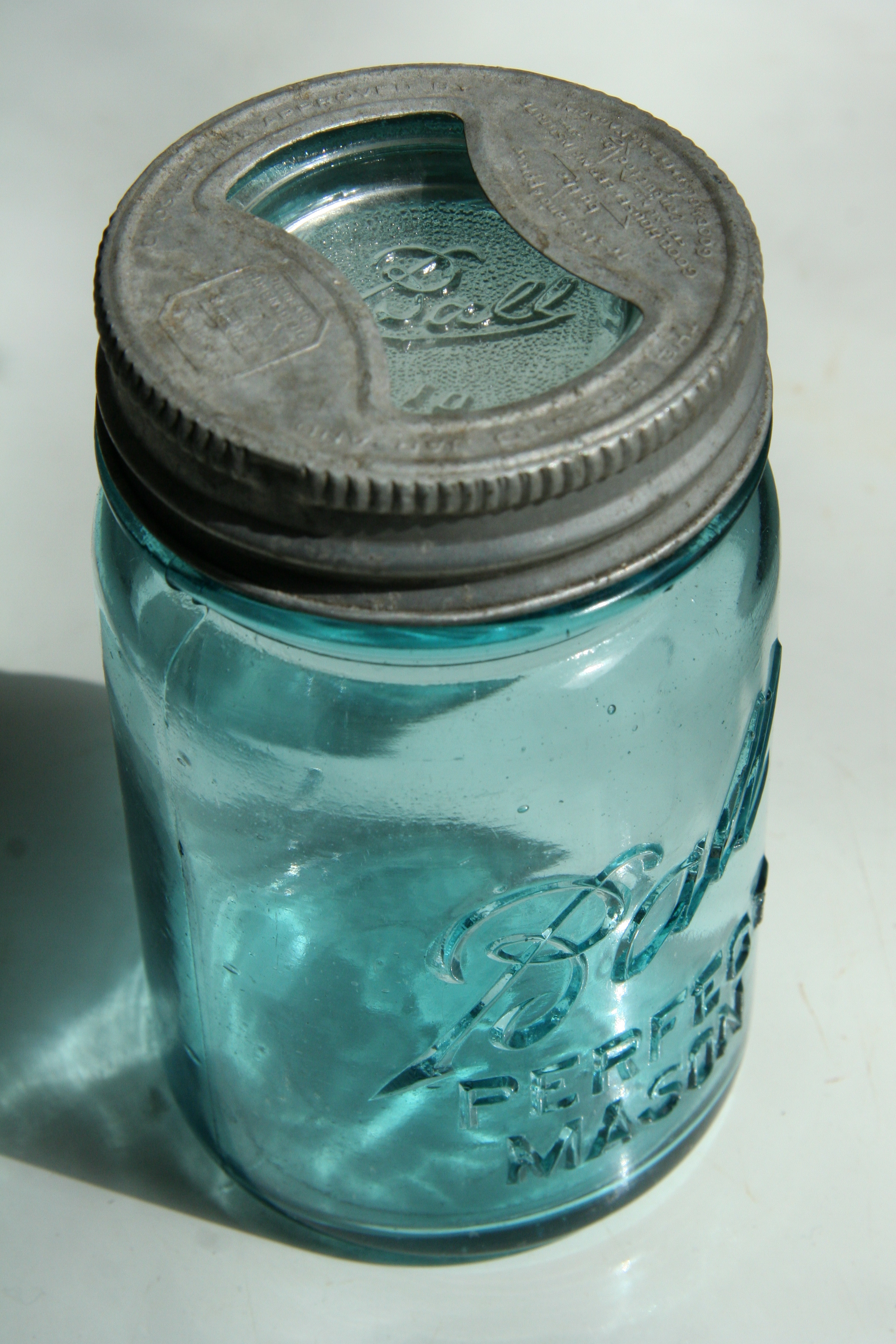
Early closure style, zinc lid over glass liner

The initial form of closure for the glass canning jar was a zinc screw-on cap, the precursor to today's screw-on lids. It usually had a milk-glass liner, but some of the earliest lids may have had transparent glass liners. The cap screwed down onto a rubber ring on the shoulder of the jar, not the lip. Between 1860 and 1900, many other patents were issued for Mason jar improvements and closures. In 1903 Alexander Kerr introduced lids with a permanent rubber seal. His improved design in 1915 used the modern design. Jars are closed with two-piece metal lids that seal on the rim. The jar lid has a rubber or rubber-like sealing surface and is held in place by a separate metal band.

Mason sold the patents for the Mason jar to the Sheet Metal Screw Company of Lewis R. Boyd in 1859. Boyd had patented a white milk-glass insert for the zinc screw lids to theoretically lessen the chances that food would be tainted by contact with the metal lid. In 1871, Mason partnered with Boyd in the Consolidated Fruit Jar Company which licensed Mason jar patents to numerous glass makers. Letters of patent issued to Mason on May 10, 1870, for improvements to his fruit-canning jar was determined to be invalid as a result of a patent infringement case brought before the Southern District of New York on June 11, 1874. The court acknowledged that Mason invented the jar in 1859, but he did not apply for a patent for an improved version of the fruit jar until 1868. In the meantime, several others had patented designs and Mason had known these jars were being produced and sold. The court ruled that Mason's delay in protecting his patent indicated he had abandoned his invention in the intervening years between 1859 and 1868 and had forfeited his patent. The court's decision allowed other manufacturers to patent, produce, and sell glass jars for canning.

=== Design variations ===
Variations of the Mason jar include the "improved Mason," which sealed on a shoulder above the thread instead of below, and the Atlas Strong Shoulder, with a reinforced shoulder area (as the original design was subject to cracks from the stress at the sealing point). A new type of Mason jar known as a "bead" jar was introduced c. 1910–1915. These continuous screw-thread jars were designed with a bead between the screw threads and the shoulder as a sealing surface. The Ball Corporation's "Perfect Mason" jar, one of the most common jars of this style, was introduced c. 1913 and produced until the mid-20th century. It had several variations, including a square-shaped jar.

=== Ball Corporation brands ===
The Ball Corporation, which once dominated the market as the largest domestic manufacturer of home canning jars, spun off its home-canning business in 1993. In 1939 the company manufactured 54% of all the canning jars made in the US. Ball ceased production of canning jars when its subsidiary, Alltrista, became a separate company in 1993. Ball Corp. acquired certain Kerr assets, including factories, in 1992 and the Kerr brand of glass home canning jars was absorbed into Alltrista in 1996. Alltrista was renamed Jarden Corporation in 2002. Newell Brands acquired Jarden Corporation in 2016. As of 2022, Newell manufactures canning jars under the brand names Ball, Bernardin, Golden Harvest, and Kerr.

== Contemporary jar design ==
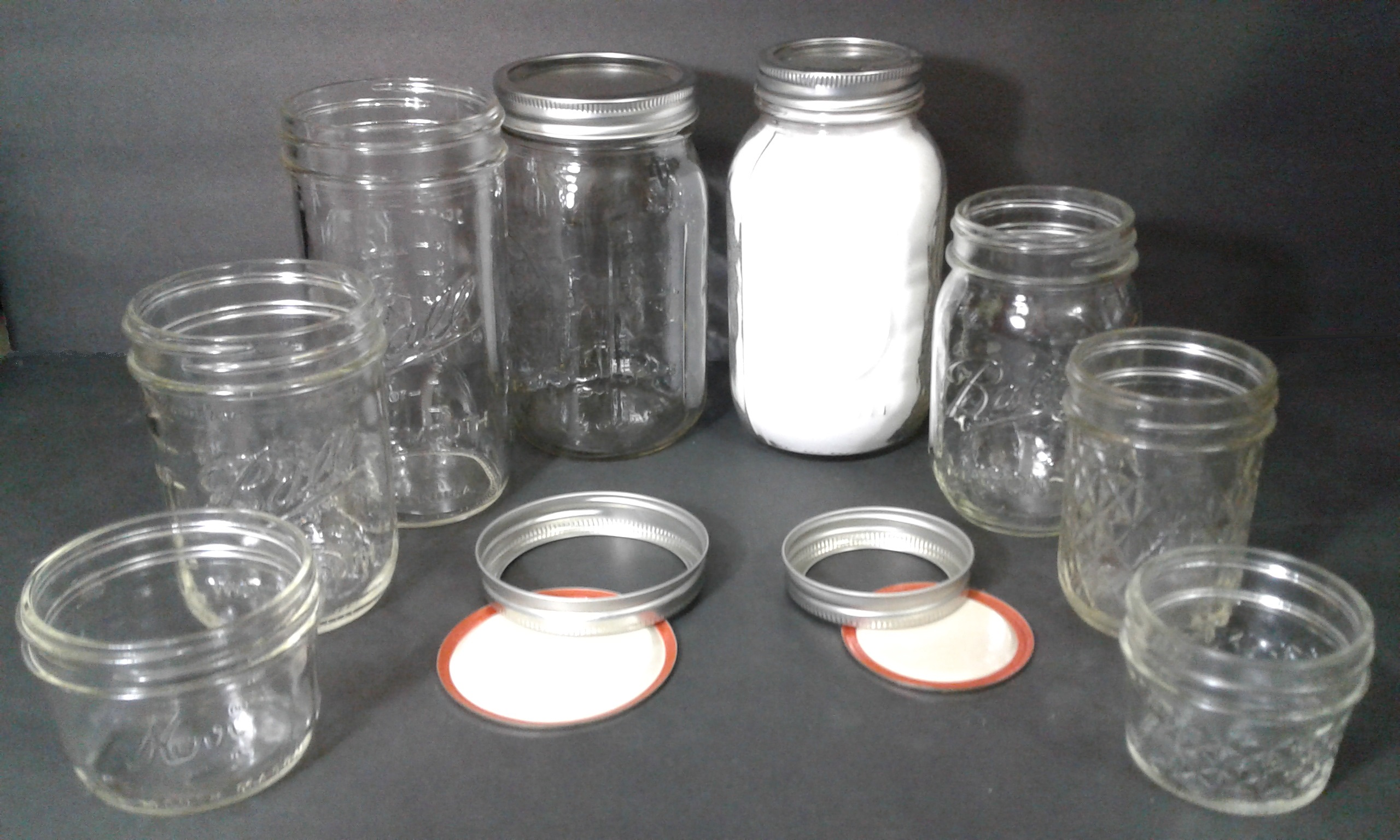
An array of Mason jars in varying sizes

A complete Mason jar is composed of a tempered glass jar, a flat self-sealing lid, and a metal band.

The jars are made with either a wide mouth (3 inches (76 mm)) or regular mouth (2 3/8 inches (60 mm)) opening. They come in a variety of sizes, from 4 ounces to a gallon. The half-gallon size and larger are not recommended for canning purposes. The most typical sizes used in canning are quart, pint, and half-pint. The jars typically have their brand name embossed on the side, though jars may also have a decorative design such as a quilting pattern or may be completely blank and smooth. Jars may be washed and reused so long as they have no chips or cracks.

In the illustration, the left half are wide mouth and the right half are regular mouth. From left to right: wide mouth half-pint, pint, 1 1/2 pint, quart, then regular mouth quart, pint, half-pint, quarter-pint. The lids and bands are also shown. The two rightmost jars are quilted.

== Contemporary lid design ==
Charles Rood Keeran's two-piece vacuum seal for Mason jars became the standard for home-canning. After his company, White Crown Fruit Jar, Keeran developed the Eversharp mechanical pencil.

A lid is made of metal, with a ring of sealing compound which acts as a gasket against the jar's rim. Lids may not be used more than once. Older unused lids should be discarded, as the sealing compound is only good for about five years from date of manufacture. New lids are slightly domed (convex). During processing, air is vented from the jar and the food shrinks. While cooling, a vacuum is created inside the jar, sucking the dome downward, making it concave – an indication that a seal is intact. Processed jars should be stored in a manner in which the lids are not disturbed and the seals remain intact.

The metal screw bands are used to properly align the lids with the jars and to hold the lids in place during processing. They should be removed after processing and may be reused many times as long as they are kept rust-free and undented.

== Collecting vintage jars ==
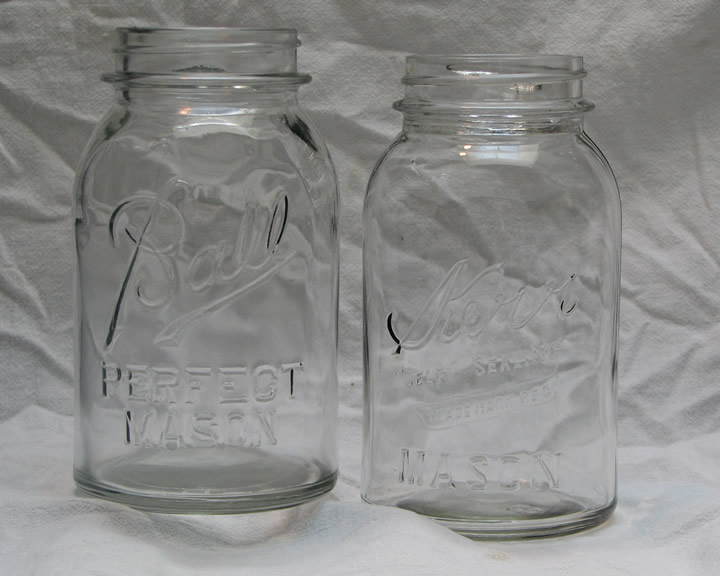
Ball and Kerr brand antique Mason jars

The value of a jar is related to its age, rarity, color, and condition. A jar's age and rarity can be determined by the color, shape, mold and production marks of the glass, and the jar's closure. A Mason jar usually has an embossed proprietary brand. Early jars embossed with "Mason's Patent November 28th 1858", that date from the late 1850s to early 1860s, closely match the illustrations of Mason's 1858 patents. Mouth-blown (or hand-blown) jars embossed with a version of "Mason's Patent November 28th 1858" were made about 1857 to 1908 and often had ground lips as well. By 1908 semi-automatic machines manufactured the majority of these jars. A machine-made Mason jars style that originated around 1909 has a sealing surface on a bead ledge below the threads. This type of jar dominated the market by the mid to late 1910s. Manufacturers continued to make jars with beaded seals after the mid-twentieth century. Ball's "Ideal" canning jar, which first appeared around 1915 and was discontinued in 1962, is one of the company's best-known jars and is popular among collectors.

Most antique jars that are not colorless are aqua, or Ball blue, a blue-green shade that was named for the Ball Corporation, a prevalent jar manufacturer. Most mouth-blown Mason jars embossed with some type of 1858 patent date were produced in aqua glass. Ball-branded Mason jars were manufactured in several colors, but the most common color was the distinctive Ball blue, which the Ball Corporation used in its jars from about 1910 to 1930. Mason jars with this particular color of glass may be attributed to Ball, since "virtually no other bottle or jar was made in that color."

Older styles of home canning jars are "not recommended" by the U.S.-based National Center for Home Food Preservation, the United States Department of Agriculture, and University Extension Services. These include: those using zinc caps and rubber jar rings, and those using glass lids, wire bails, and rubber sealing rings. These provide "no definitive way to determine if a vacuum seal is formed".

== Other uses ==
Aside from canning, mason jars are also sometimes used as dessert containers.

The jars have been used for a variety of household functional and decorative purposes. Mason jars have been turned into items such as oil lanterns, soap dispensers, speakers and vases.

== See also ==
- Fowler's Vacola jar – Australian product, glass jar sealed with a rubber ring, metal lid, and a spring fastener
- Kilner jar – British canning jar brand; rubber-sealed, screw-topped jar
- Weck jar – German product, glass jar with glass lid, rubber seal, metal spring clips
- Le Parfait – French product, glass jar with glass lid, rubber seal, metal spring clips
