= List of instruments used in anatomy =

Instruments used in Anatomy dissections are as follows:

== Instrument list ==
Instrument	Uses
Autopsy table	for placing and fixing the corpse
Refrigerators	for preservation of the corpse
Dissection scissors	used to hold or move structures
Arterial & jugular tubes	to draw or drain out all the blood before replacing it with embalming fluids like formaldehyde for preservation of structures as practiced in Anatomy
Head rest	to elevate the head
Ropes	to tie the corpse in places so that it does not change posture during dissection
Rubber gloves	protective; video link
Goggles	protective; video link
Jackets, aprons, etc.	protective; video link
Scalpels	to cut the skin, organs or fibrous structures like fascia
Bone saw	used to cut bones like that of the head
Skull breaker or often a (hammer and chisel)	to break open the vault of the skull
Sternal saw	for cutting into the chest of the body by cutting the sternum
Dissecting knife	sharp cutting instruments
Toothed forceps	for tearing or holding structures
Mallet	used as a hammer
Skull key	a T-shaped chisel used as a lever while removing skull cap
Large knife	to cleanly cut the brain into anatomical sections
Rib shears	to cut through the ribs while opening the chest
Dissecting scissors	for sharp cutting
Specimen jars	preservation of anatomical specimens
Metacarpal saw	video: External link; a bone saw
Double-ended probe	used for probing either foramina
Tongue tie	to tie away the tongue so that it doesn't fall back into the pharynx
Formaldehyde	primary preservative for Anatomy; video link
X-ray boxes	to view X-ray images

== Image gallery ==
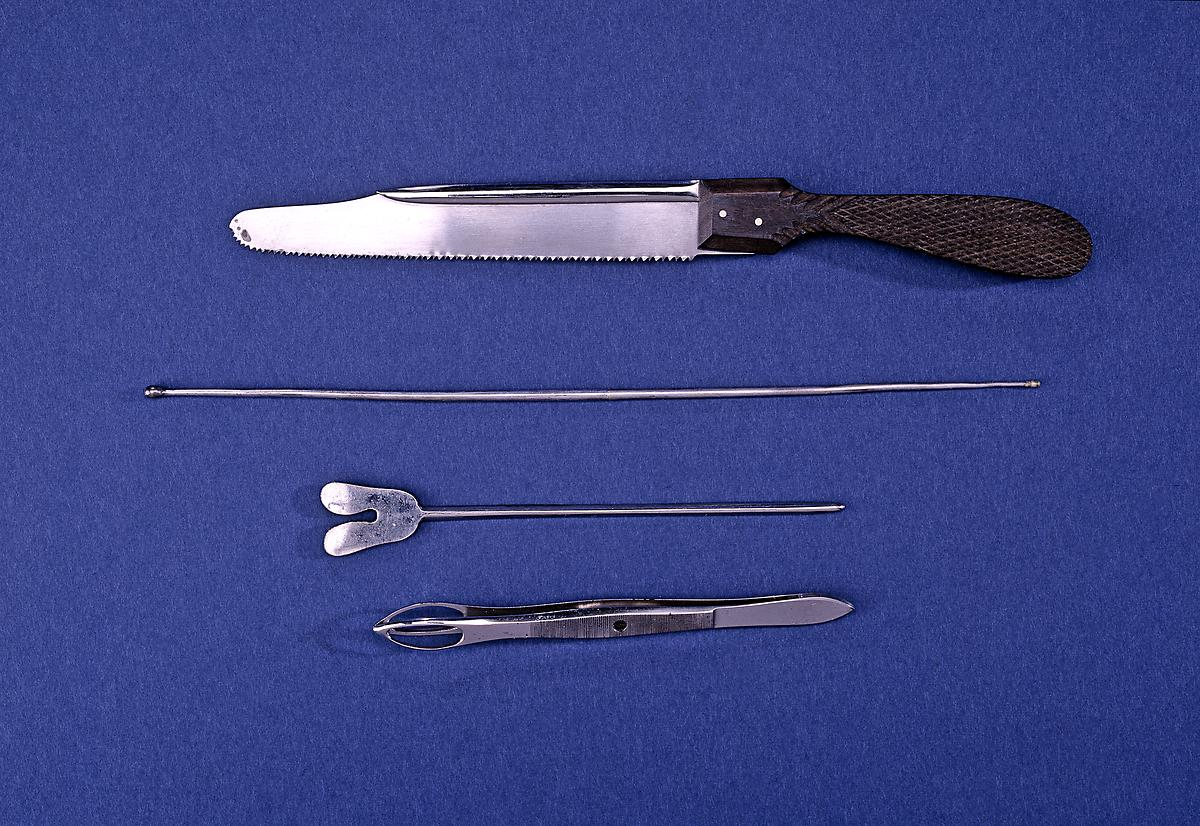
Autopsy instruments

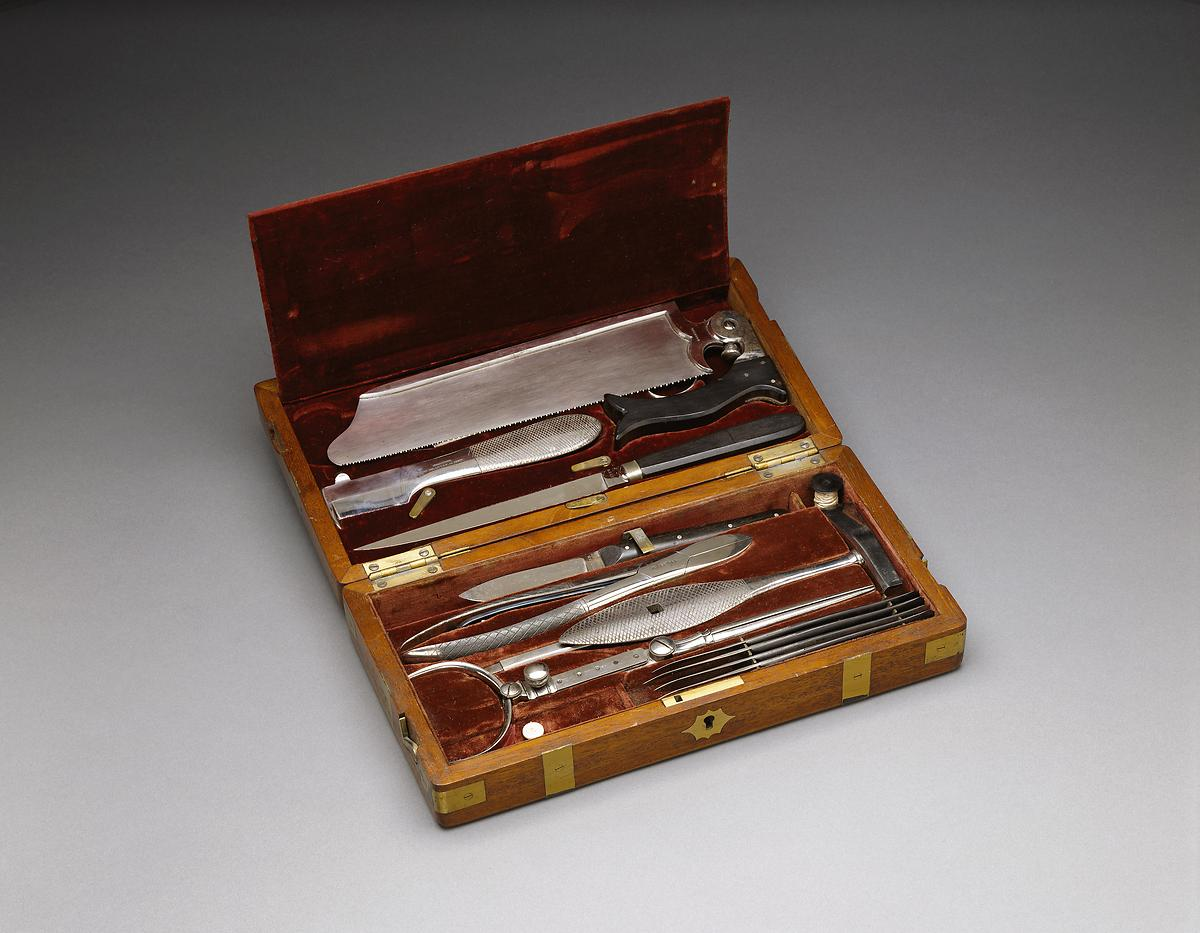
Autopsy instruments (old set)

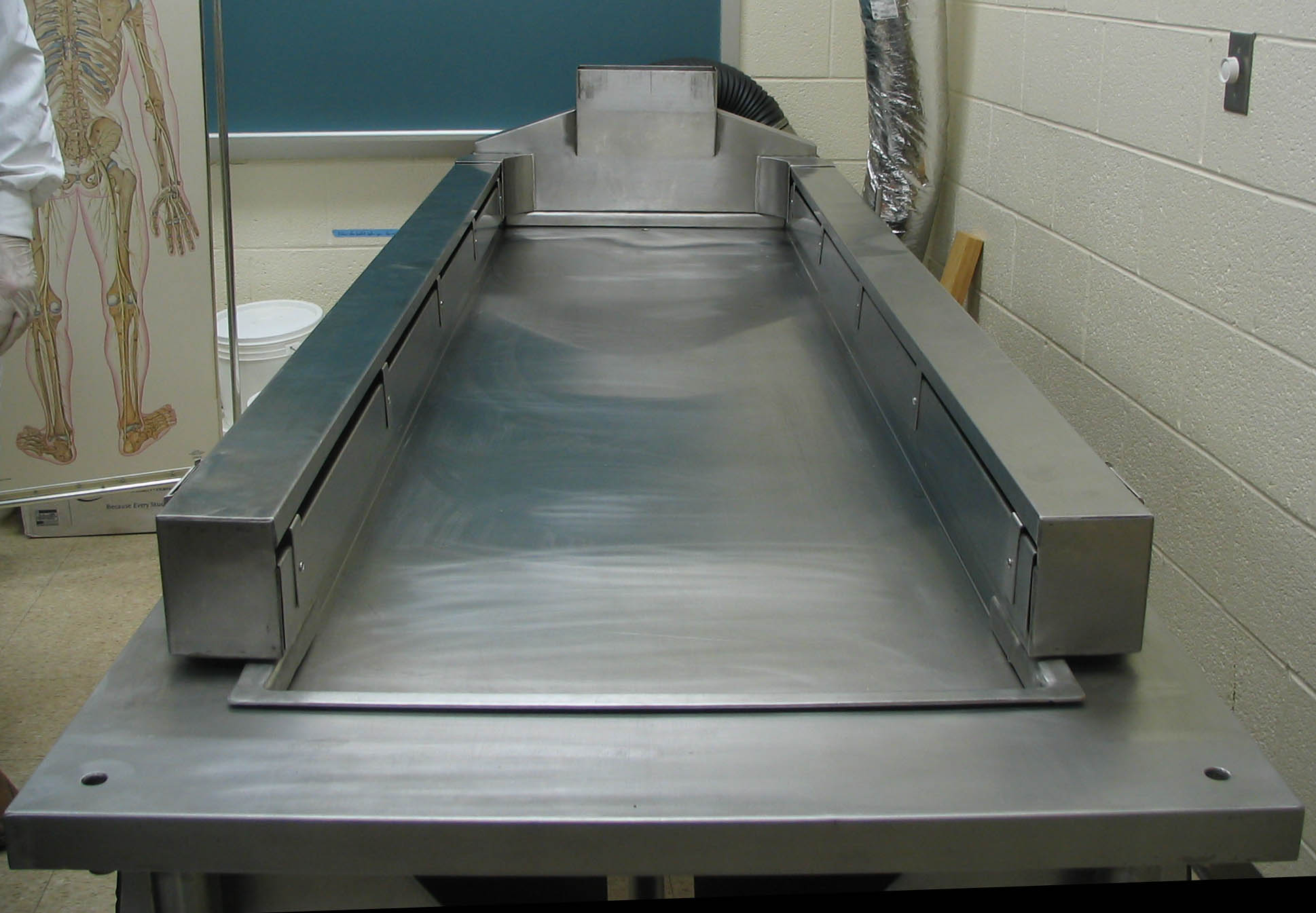
dissection table

a scalpel

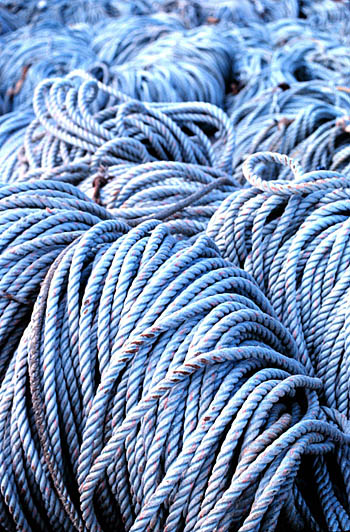
