= Home canning =

Process for preserving foods for storage

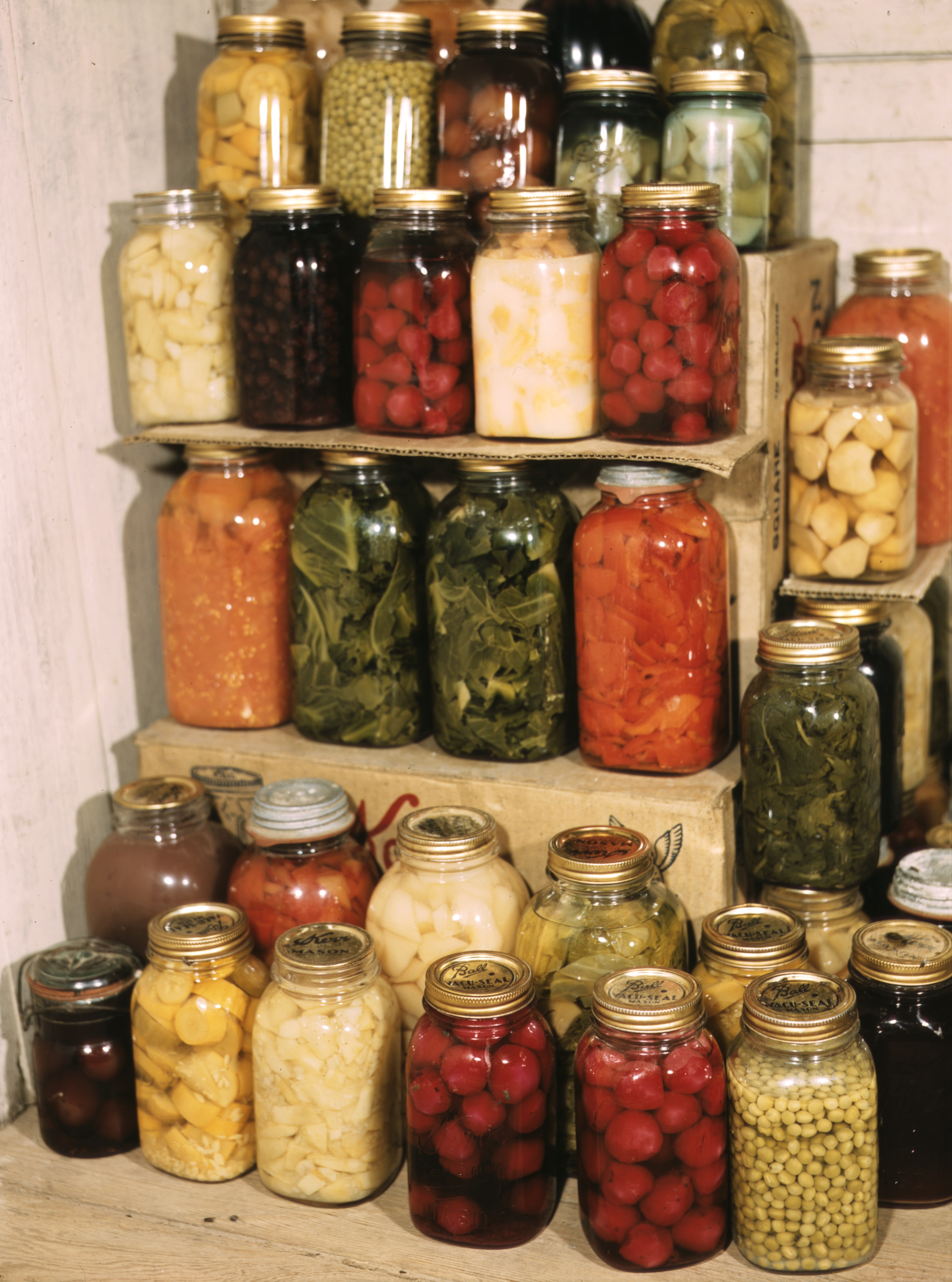
Preserved food in Mason jars

Home canning or bottling, also known colloquially as putting up or processing, is the process of preserving foods, in particular, fruits, vegetables, and meats, by packing them into glass jars and then heating the jars to create a vacuum seal and kill the organisms that would create spoilage.

Though ceramic and glass containers had been used for storage for thousands of years, the technique of canning, which involves applying heat for preservation, was only invented in the first decade of the 1800s. Before that, food storage containers were used for non-perishable foods, or with preservatives such as salt, sugar, vinegar, or alcohol.

== Techniques ==
The two methods of home canning are water bath canning and pressure canning. Both involve placing the food inside special glass canning jars and then heating the contents. Home canning glass jars are annealed during manufacture to increase their ability to withstand temperature changes and mechanical shocks. There are several regional variations on jar design, such as Mason jars (North America), Fowler's Vacola jars (Australia), Kilner jars (England), and Weck jars (Germany).

=== Water bath canning ===
Water bath canning is appropriate for high-acid foods only, such as jam, jelly, most fruit, pickles, and tomato products with acid added. It is not appropriate for meats and low-acid foods such as vegetables. This method uses a pot large enough to hold and submerge the glass canning jars. Food is placed in glass canning jars and placed in the pot. Hot water is added to cover the jars. Water is brought to a boil (212 °F (100 °C)) and held there for at least 10 minutes. Different foods require a different length of time under boil; larger jars require longer times.

=== Pressure canning ===
Pressure canning is the only safe home canning method for meats and low-acid foods. This method uses a pressure canner — similar to, but heavier than, a pressure cooker. A small amount of water is placed in the pressure canner and it is turned to steam, which without pressure would be 212 °F (100 °C), but under pressure is raised to 240 °F (116 °C). Based on the recipe, the canner is heated until the correct pressure is reached, and the jars left for the appropriate amount of time (charts have been published with times and pressures). The heat is turned off, pressure reduced, canner opened, and hot jars carefully lifted out and placed on an insulated surface (towels, wood cutting board, etc.) and out of drafts to cool.

== Safety ==
While it is possible to safely preserve many kinds of foods, home canning can expose consumers to botulism and other kinds of food poisoning if done incorrectly. The most common source of foodborne botulism is home-canned foods prepared in an unsafe manner. Safety measures must be taken when performing home canning, since ingestion of toxin in food produced by Clostridium botulinum can cause death. Because of the high risk of illness or death associated with improper canning techniques, the United States Department of Agriculture (USDA) considers it critical that consumers who intend to can at home obtain proper and current information from a reliable source. At the basis of these recommendations is the balance between bringing the food to a high enough temperature for a long enough time that spoilage and disease-producing microorganisms are killed, while not heating the food so much that it loses nutritive value or palatability.

=== Unsafe methods ===
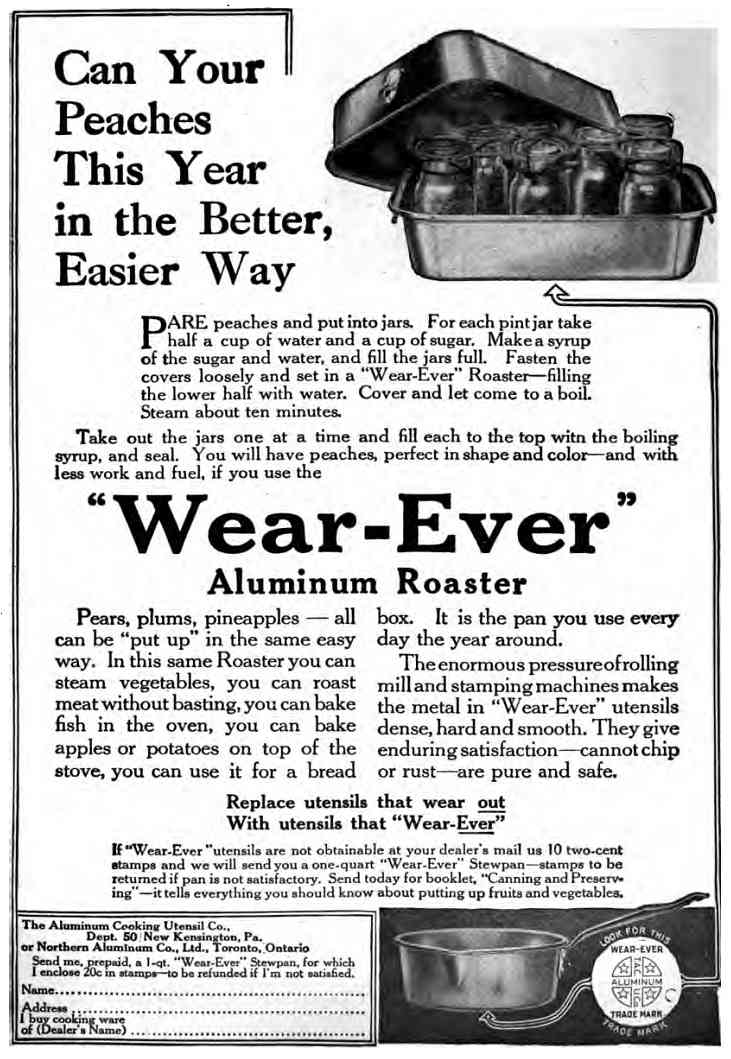
A 1914 advertisement for a combination steam canner and roaster. The described method will not protect against botulism.

The following methods have been determined to be unsafe food preservation techniques:

- Open-kettle — Heating food in an open kettle, then pouring into jars, closing with a lid, and not further processing.
- Oven canning
- Dry canning — Processing dry goods or vegetables without the addition of liquids in an oven
- Canning food in a microwave oven, slow cooker or pressure cooker
- Canning powders — alleged preservatives. They do not replace the need for proper heat processing.
- Atmospheric steam canning — Processing with 100 °C steam, not under pressure
- Use of vintage style sealing materials such as jars with wire bails and glass caps, or zinc caps with rubber rings.
- Instead of a lid, cellophane and rubber bands (moldy).
- Using the water bath technique for low-acid foods (foods with pH greater than 4.6).
- Otherwise correct water bath or pressure canning but processing for too little time, the wrong pressure, or not considering variations in time/pressure due to altitude.
- Re-using one-use seals
- Using cracked or chipped jars

== North America ==
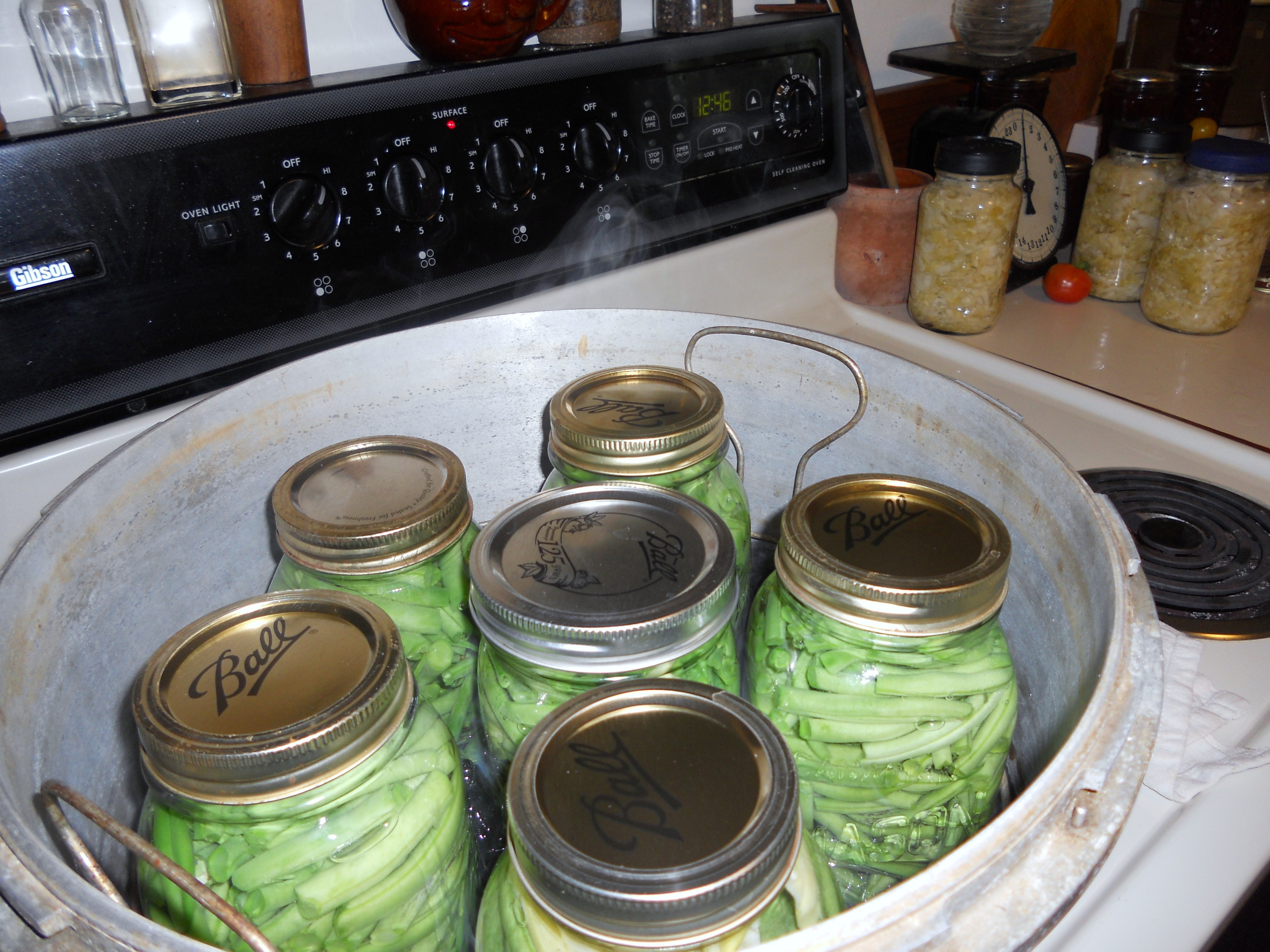
Green beans in a pressure canner ready to be processed

In North America, home canning is usually done in Mason jars, which have thicker walls than single-use commercial glass jars. Unless the food being preserved has a high acid content (pH <4.6) or salt or sugar content resulting in water availability <0.85, such as pickles or jellies, the filled jars are also processed under pressure in a canner, a specialized type of pressure cooker. Ordinary pressure cookers are not recommended for canning as their smaller size and the reduced thickness of the cooker wall will not allow for the correct building up and reducing time of pressure, which is factored into the overall processing time and therefore will not destroy all the harmful microorganisms. The goal in using a pressure canner is to achieve a "botulinum cook" of 121 °C for 3 minutes, throughout the entire volume of canned product. Canners often incorporate racks to hold Mason jars, and pressure canners are capable of achieving the elevated temperatures needed to prevent spoilage.

The most common configuration is a Mason jar with a flat lid and screw ring. The lid is generally made of plated or painted steel, with an elastomeric washer or gasket bonded to the underside of the rim. The lid also incorporates a slightly dimpled shape, which acts as an indicator of the vacuum (or lack thereof) inside a sealed jar. Jars are commonly in either pint or quart capacities, with two opening diameters, known as "standard" and "wide mouth".

When a jar has cooled and is properly sealed, pressing the dimple on the lid will not make any sound. An improperly sealed jar will allow the dimple to move up and down, sometimes making a popping noise. Lack of this noise does not necessarily indicate that the food in the jar is properly preserved. Typically, during the cooling process, a properly sealed lid will pop once as the pressure inside the jar is reduced enough that atmospheric pressure pushes the lid inward.

Older variations had a ceramic seal inside a one-piece zinc lid. Another method that is no longer recommended was the use of layer of hot paraffin wax poured directly over the top of the food (especially jams and jellies) to seal it from air, thus reducing growth of aerobic microorganisms like mold.

== United Kingdom ==
In the United Kingdom home bottling is done with Kilner jars in a similar way to the Mason jars in the US, and although old-style Kilner jars have a glass lid without a "dimple" more recent varieties do.

== Australia ==
In Australia the most popular home canning system is Fowler's Vacola. This system uses glass jars, single use seals, metal lids, and a water bath canning sterilization process. During the canning process the lids are secured by metal tension clips which are removed once a vacuum seal has formed. Fowler's Vacola products are still produced and are available from some hardware stores. Used equipment is frequently sold on online auction sites and in opportunity shops.

== Germany ==
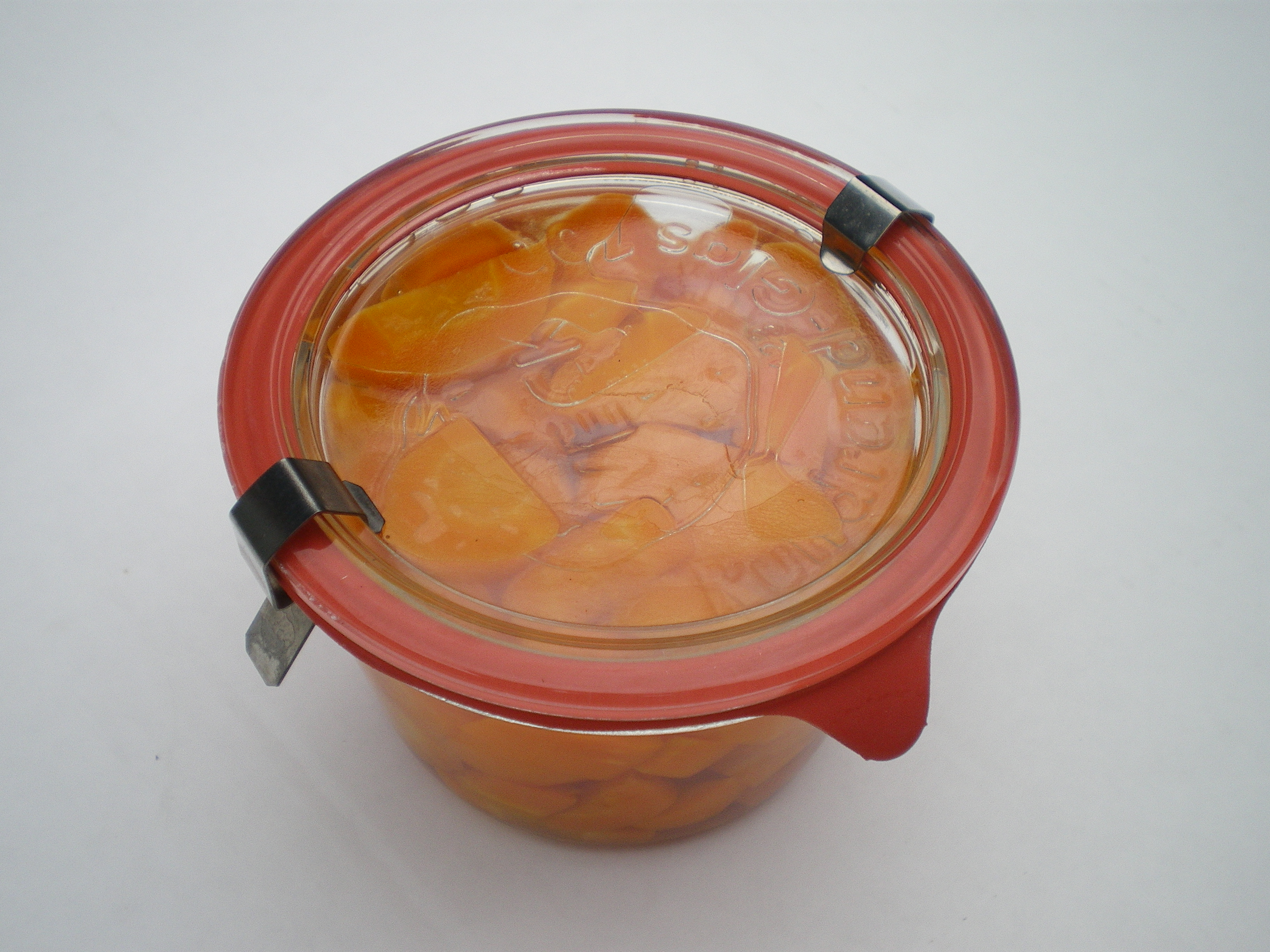
Weck glass with rubber seal and steel tension clips. The red tongue pointing downwards indicates a correct seal

In Germany the most popular home canning system is Weck jar. This system uses glass jars, rubber seals, glass lids, and a water bath canning sterilization process.

== Standard jar sizes ==
United States:

- 4 ounce (jelly)
- 8 ounce (jelly)
- 8 ounce (half US pint, 236 ml)
- 16 ounce (US pint, 473 ml)
- 24 ounce (US pint and a half, 710 ml)
- 32 ounce (US quart, 946 ml)
- 64 ounce (half US gallon, 1892 ml)

Metric:

- 250 ml
- 500 ml (half litre)
- 750 ml (three quarters of a litre)
- 1000 ml (litre)
- 1900 ml (~half US gallon)

== See also ==
- Nicolas Appert
- Weck jar
- Canning
- Food preservation
- Pickling
- Pressure cooking
