= Reusable Industrial Packaging Association =

The Reusable Industrial Packaging Association (RIPA) is a trade association for North American manufacturers, reconditioners, packagers, suppliers, and distributors of industrial packaging. RIPA was founded in 1942 and is headquartered in Rockville, Maryland in the United States. It emphasizes eco-friendly, reusable solutions for industrial packaging.

== History ==
RIPA was founded in early 1942, shortly after the attack on Pearl Harbor and the US entry into World War II. It was originally known as the National Barrel and Drum Association (NABADA), and it was formed to coordinate industry activities in support of the war effort. The organization continued after the war and served to coordinate industry positions during increased regulation in the 1970s.

== Renaming ==
NABADA was eventually renamed the Reusable Industrial Packaging Association (RIPA). Though originally focused on steel drums and barrels, RIPA has come to represent other areas of the industrial packaging industry, such as plastic and fiber packaging.

From 1948 to 1983, RIPA was headed by Morris Hershson. In the late 1970s and early 1980s, Hershson increasingly sought international coordination in the industrial packaging industry. RIPA joined with European and Asian trade organizations to found the International Confederation of Container Reconditioners (ICCR) in the mid-1980s.

Paul Rankin has been the organization's president from 1990 to the present.

== Activities ==
RIPA gathers and shares information on the industrial packaging industry and coordinates that industry's positions on legislation and regulation. It particularly encourages increased reuse of industrial packaging, leading to lower costs and reduced environmental impact. RIPA also publishes Reusable Packaging Today, an industry newsletter.

RIPA requires all of its members to adhere to its Code of Operating Practice. These guidelines are intended to create better environmental controls, recycling practices, and regulatory compliance across the industry.

== See also ==
- Glass Packaging Institute
