= Beer bottle =

Bottle designed as a container for beer

Assortment of beer bottles

A beer bottle is a bottle designed as a container for beer. Such designs vary greatly in size and shape, but the glass commonly is brown or green to reduce spoilage from light, especially ultraviolet.

The most widely established alternatives to glass containers for beer in retail sales are beverage cans and aluminium bottles; for larger volumes kegs are in common use.

Many countries have implemented bottle deposit schemes to increase the rate of recycling and reduce the rate of littering.

== Bottling lines ==
Bottling lines are production lines that fill beer into bottles on a large scale.

The process is typically as follows:

1. Filling a bottle in a filling machine (filler) typically involves drawing beer from a holding tank
2. Capping the bottle, labeling it
3. Packing the bottles into cases or cartons

Many smaller breweries send their bulk beer to large facilities for contract bottling—though some will bottle by hand.

The first step in bottling beer is depalletising, where the empty bottles are removed from the original packaging delivered from the manufacturer, so that individual bottles may be handled. The bottles may then be rinsed with filtered water or air, and may have carbon dioxide injected into them in attempt to reduce the level of oxygen within the bottle. The bottle then enters a "filler" which fills the bottle with beer and may also inject a small amount of inert gas (CO_{2} or nitrogen) on top of the beer to disperse oxygen, as O_{2} can ruin the quality of the product by oxidation.

Next the bottle enters a labelling machine ("labeller") where a label is applied. The product is then packed into boxes and warehoused, ready for sale.

Depending on the magnitude of the bottling endeavour, there are many different types of bottling machinery available. Liquid level machines fill bottles so they appear to be filled to the same line on every bottle, while volumetric filling machines fill each bottle with exactly the same amount of liquid. Overflow pressure fillers are the most popular machines with beverage makers, while gravity filling machines are the most cost-effective. In terms of automation, inline filling machines are most popular, but rotary machines are much faster albeit much more expensive.

== Shape and size ==
=== Stubby and steinie ===
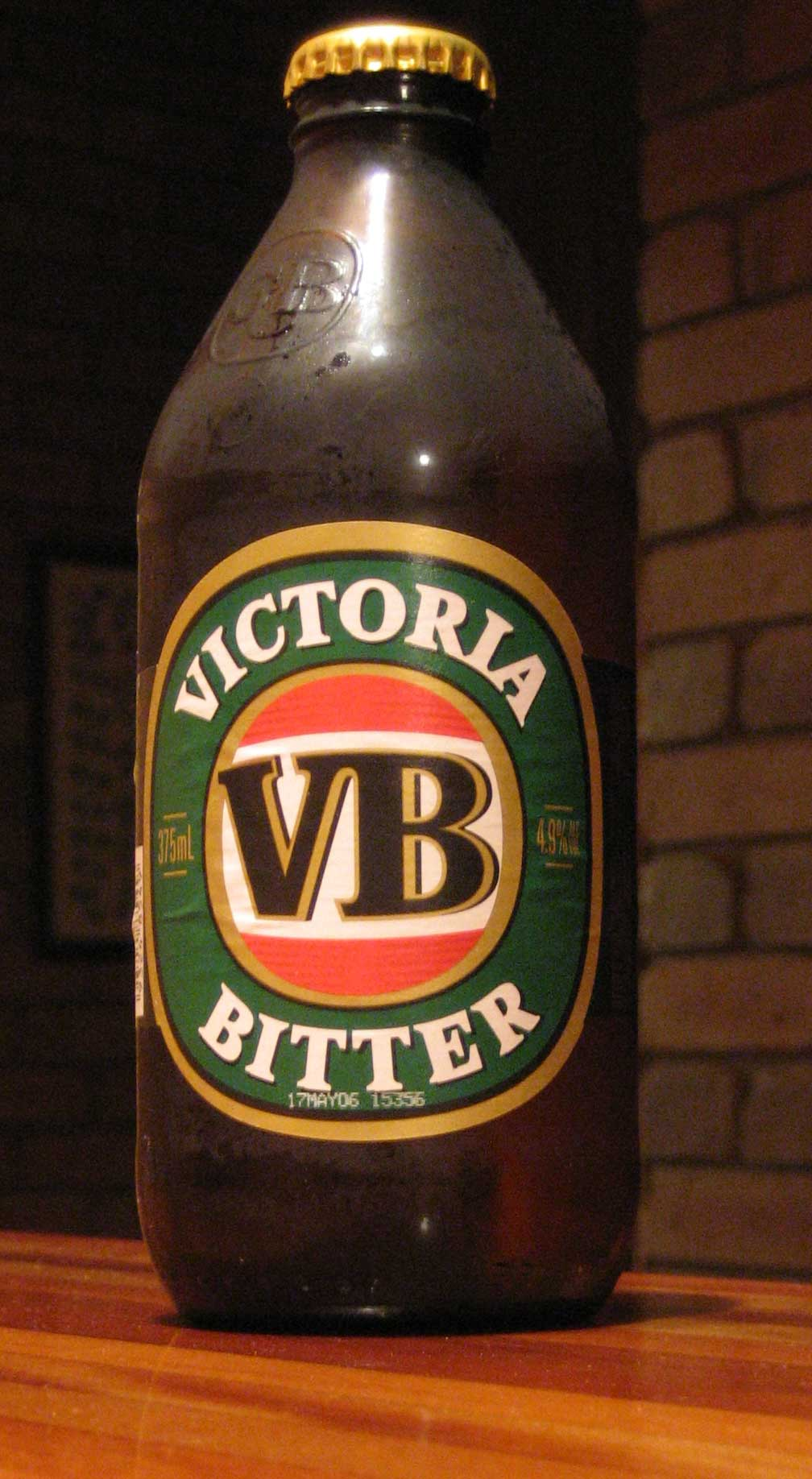
Australian 375 mL stubby

A short glass bottle used for beer is generally called a stubby, or originally a steinie. Shorter and flatter than standard bottles, stubbies pack into a smaller space for transporting. The steinie was introduced in the 1930s by Joseph Schlitz Brewing Company and derived their name from their similarity to the shape of a beer stein, which was emphasized in marketing. The bottles are sometimes made with thick glass so that the bottle can be cleaned and reused before being recycled. The capacity of a stubby is generally somewhere between 330 ml (11.6 imp fl oz; 11.2 U.S. fl oz) and 375 mL (13.2 imp fl oz; 12.7 U.S. fl oz); the Canadian stubby bottle is traditionally 341 mL (11.5 U.S. fl oz; 12.0 imp fl oz), while the U.S. longneck was 355 mL (12.0 U.S. fl oz; 12.5 imp fl oz). Some of the expected advantages of stubby bottles are: ease of handling; less breakage; lighter in weight; less storage space; and lower center of gravity.

After the end of Prohibition in the U.S. in 1933, many breweries began marketing beer in steel cans. The glass industry responded by devising short bottles with little necks, nicknamed stubbies, and types with short necks were called steinies. Capacities varied, with 12oz being the most common size used for soft drinks. The steinie dominated in the U.S. by 1950, and the neck became longer, such as seen with the familiar Budweiser bottle. Stubbies were popular in Canada until the 1980s. Standard SP Lager from Papua New Guinea and Victoria Bitter in Australia, are some of the few beers still sold in 12oz neckless stubbies. The U.S. steinie shape dominates for small beer bottles the world over, in sizes from half-pint to the European 500ml. The word stubbie is only in common use in Australia and Canada. In Australia it is generally referred to as a 'stubby'.

Stubbies are used extensively in Europe, and were used almost exclusively in Canada from 1962 to 1986 as part of a standardization effort intended to reduce breakage, and the cost of sorting bottles when they were returned by customers. Due to their nostalgic value, stubbies were reintroduced by a number of Canadian craft brewers in the early 2000s. In the U.S., stubbies have generally fallen out of favour, with only a few brands still using them such as the Session Lager by the Full Sail Brewing Company, Switchback Brewing Co in Burlington, Vermont, US and Red Stripe, a Jamaican brand import. Coors Brewing Company uses the stubby form for nostalgic packaging of Coors Banquet.

=== Belgium ===
Belgian beer is usually packaged in 330 mL (11.6 imp fl oz; 11.2 U.S. fl oz) bottles in four or six packs, or in 750 mL (26.4 imp fl oz; 25.4 U.S. fl oz) bottles similar to those used for Champagne. Some beers, usually lambics and fruit lambics are also bottled in 375 mL (13.2 imp fl oz; 12.7 U.S. fl oz) servings.

=== Britain ===
Through the latter part of the 20th century, most British brewers used a standard design of bottle, known as the London Brewers' Standard. This was in brown glass, with a conical medium neck in the pint and with a rounded shoulder in the half-pint and nip sizes. Pints, defined as 568 mL (20.0 imp fl oz; 19.2 U.S. fl oz), and half-pints, or 284 mL (10.0 imp fl oz; 9.6 U.S. fl oz) were the most common, but some brewers also bottled in nip (1/3-pint) and quart (2-pint) sizes. It was for example mostly barley wines that were bottled in nips, and Midlands breweries such as Shipstone of Nottingham that bottled in quarts. This standardisation simplified the automation of bottling and made it easier for customers to recycle bottles as they were interchangeable. They carried a deposit charge, which in the 1980s rose to seven pence for a pint and five pence for a half-pint. Some brewers however used individual bottle designs: among these were Samuel Smith Old Brewery, which used an embossed clear bottle, and Scottish and Newcastle, which used a clear bottle for their Newcastle Brown Ale (both designs survive in the 500 mL (16.9 U.S. fl oz; 17.6 imp fl oz) size). Other brewers such as Timothy Taylor had used their own embossed bottles and rare examples continued to be reused into the 1980s. During the 1980s the industry turned away from refillable bottles. UK beer bottles are all one-trip, and most are 500 mL (16.9 U.S. fl oz; 17.6 imp fl oz) or 330 mL (11.2 U.S. fl oz; 11.6 imp fl oz) in volume. The compulsory high recycled-content of these bottles makes them very dark and the lack of temper makes them chip easily when being opened.

=== Netherlands (pijpje) ===
Most beer producers in the Netherlands sell their beers in a brown 300 mL (10.6 imp fl oz; 10.1 U.S. fl oz) bottle. Its official name is Bruin Nederlands Retour CBK-fles (Brown Dutch Return CBK Bottle), with CBK standing for Centraal Brouwerij Kantoor, the former name of the Dutch trade association of larger breweries, Nederlandse Brouwers. The name is abbreviated as BNR-fles, but the bottle is more commonly known as pijpje (little pipe).

The total length of the bottle is 207 mm, with a conical neck of about one-third of that length. The bottles carry a 10-cent deposit. The breweries share a pool of re-usable bottles of the same type.

=== Germany ===
In Germany, approximately 99% of beer bottles are reusable deposit bottles and are either 330 or 500 mL (11.6 or 17.6 imp fl oz; 11.2 or 16.9 U.S. fl oz). At any given time, an estimated 2 billion beer bottles are in circulation in Germany, each of which sees an average of 36 reuses. The deposit for beer bottles sealed with crown corks is €0.08; for bottles with flip-top closures, the deposit is €0.15.

The Euro bottle was the main shape in use until the 1980s, when many breweries began to switch over to NRW and Longneck bottles, both of which are available as 330ml and 500ml bottles. The market leader is the NRW bottle with a market share of 39%, followed by Longneck at 33%. Many smaller, traditional breweries have retained the Euro bottle as part of their corporate identity, particularly Augustiner, Tegernseer, and Schlenkerla.

Common German bottles

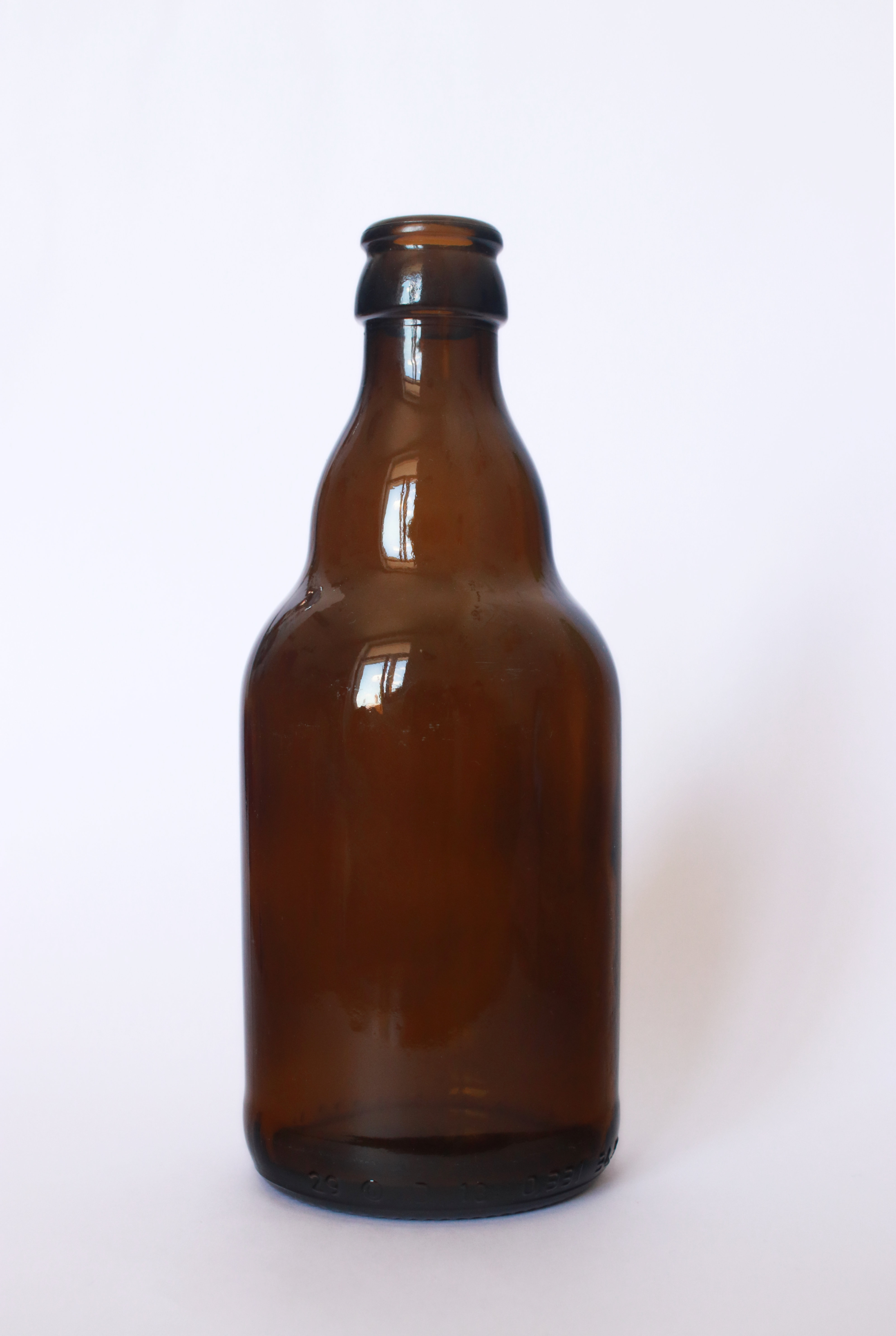
330ml "Steinie" bottle

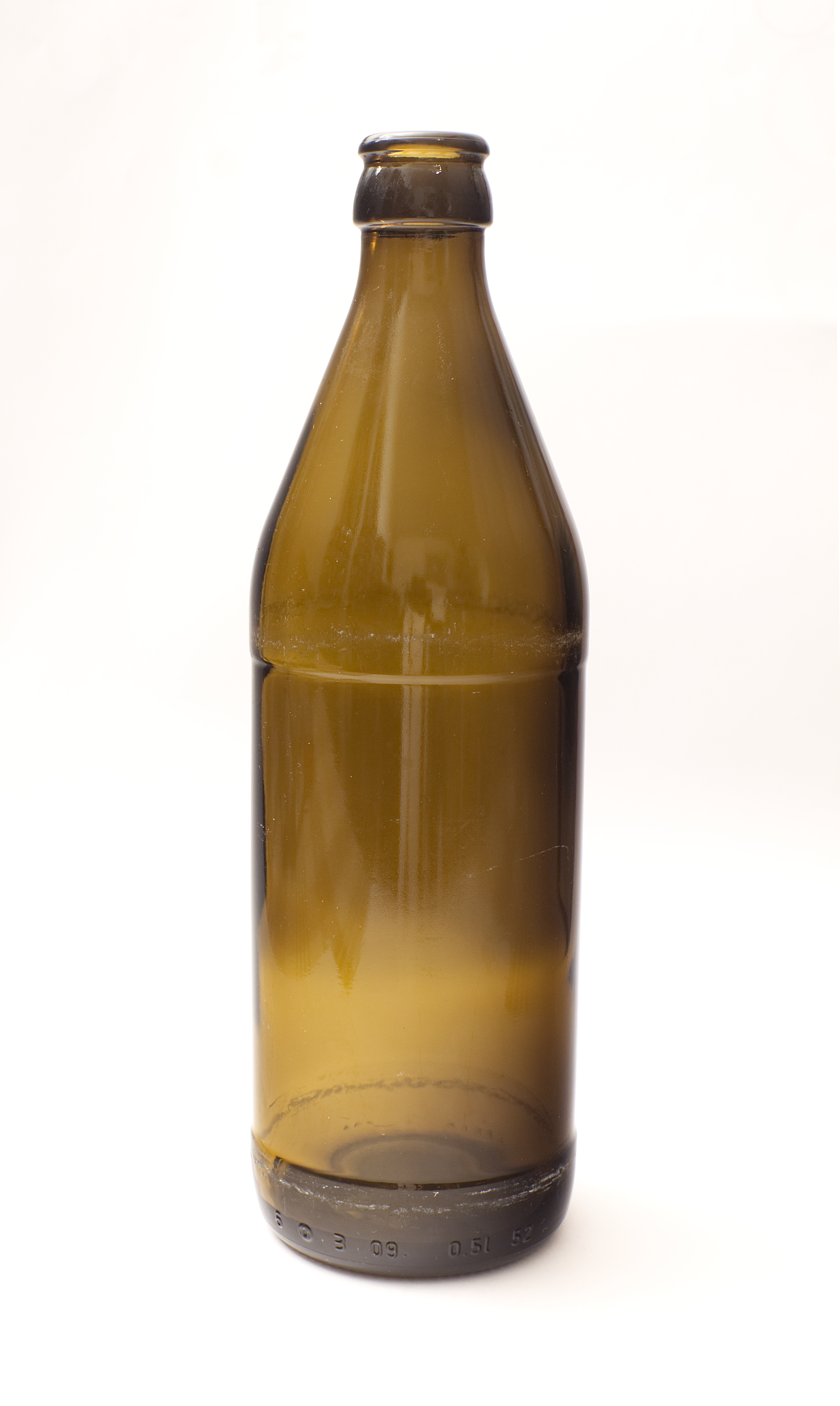
500ml Euro bottle

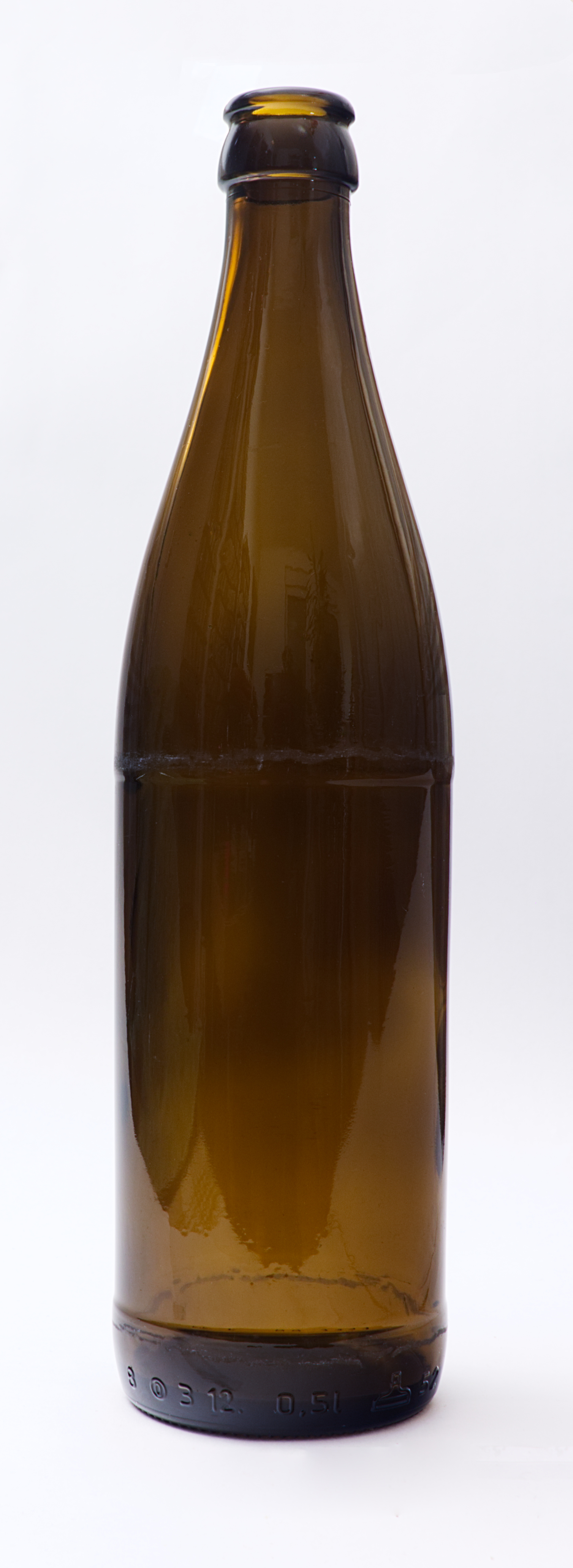
500ml NRW Bottle

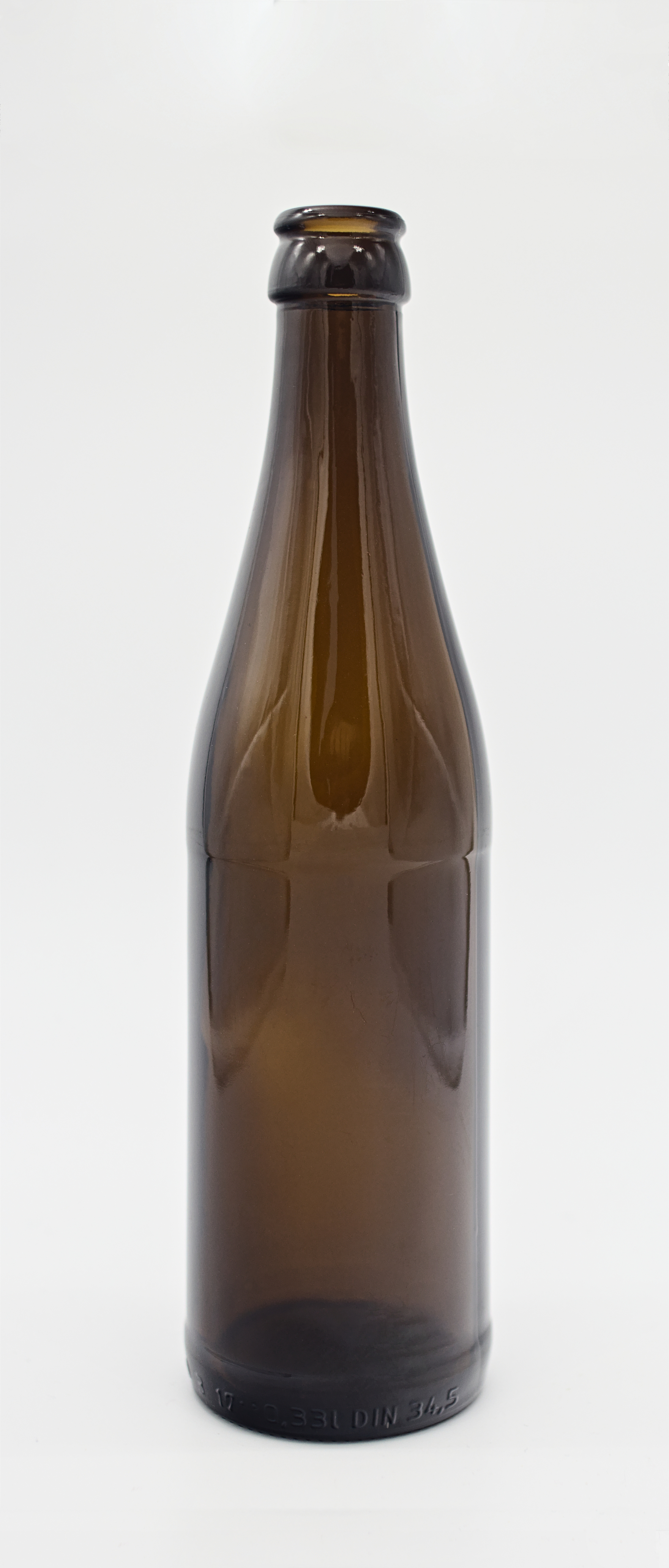
330ml NRW Bottle, also called "Vichy" bottle

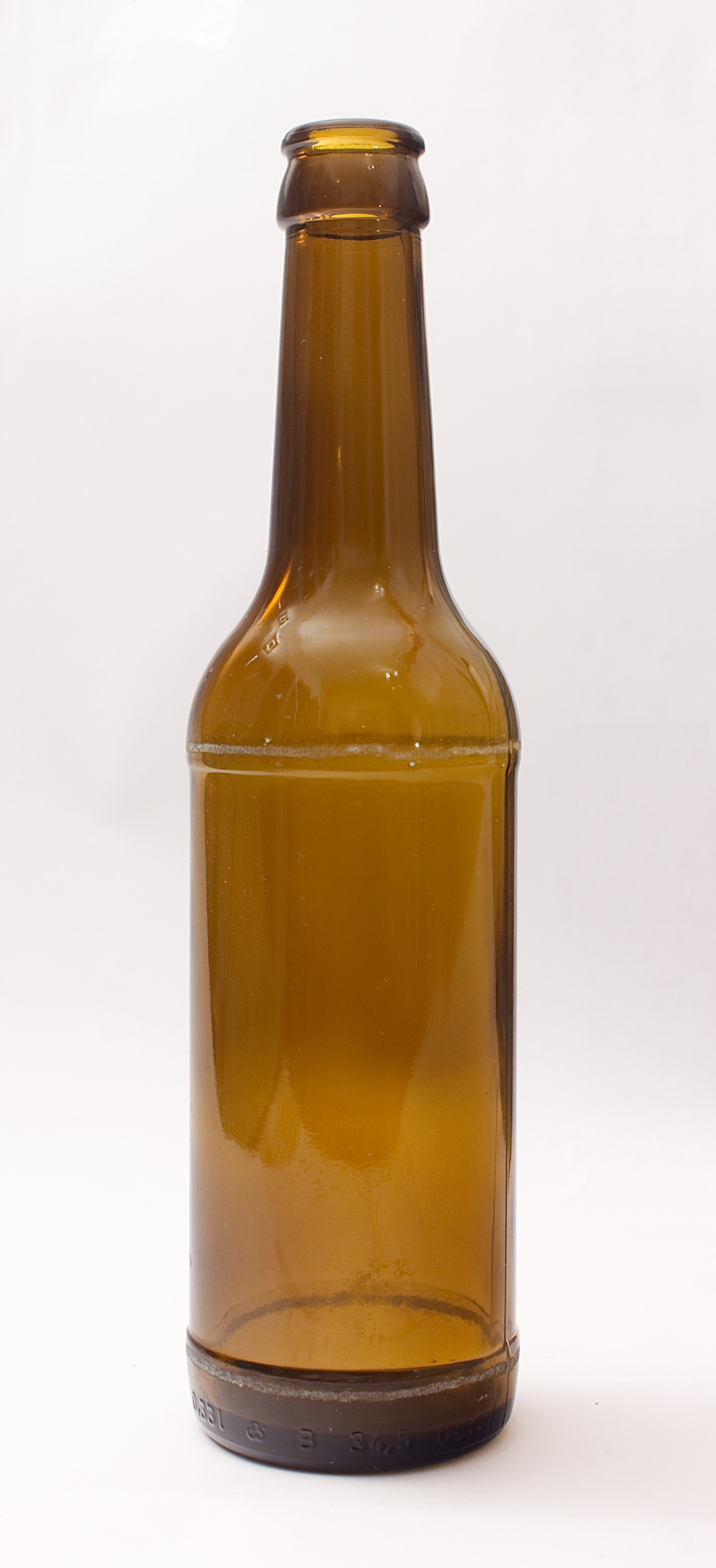
330ml Longneck bottle

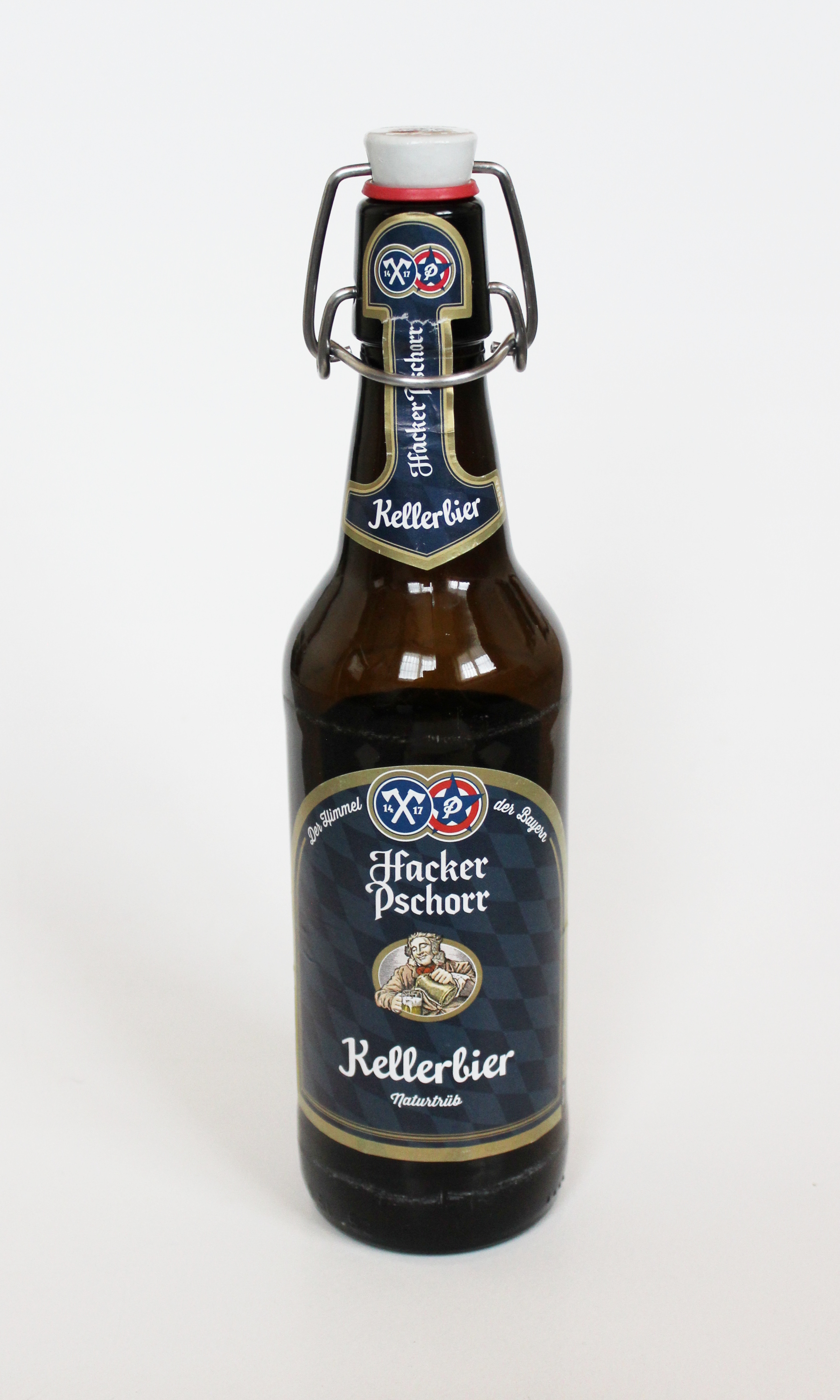
500ml Bügelflasche

=== Longneck, Industry Standard Bottle (ISB) or North American longneck ===
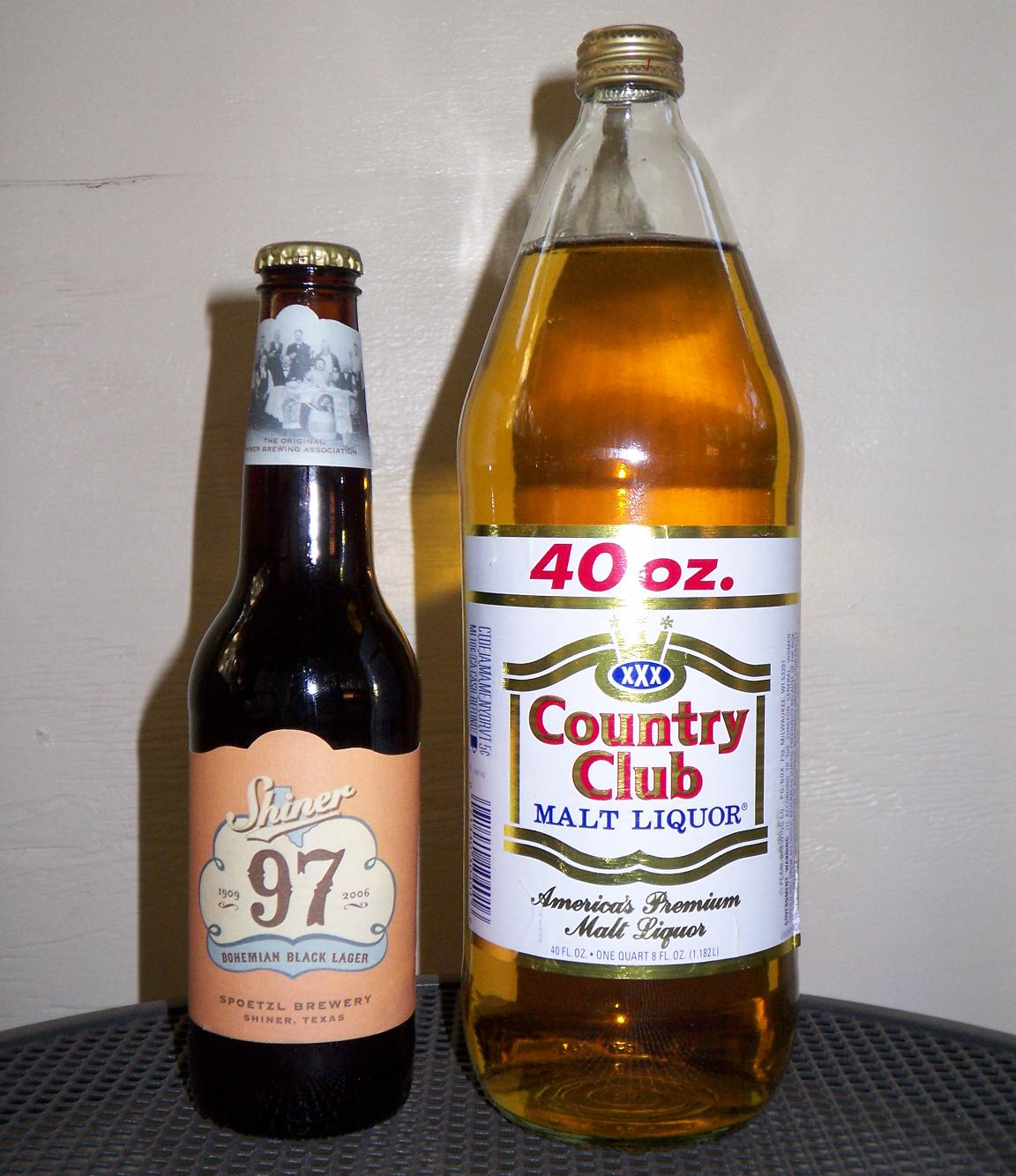
A 12-oz Industry Standard Bottle (left) compared to a 40-oz bottle (right)

A North American longneck is a type of beer bottle with a long neck. It is known as the standard longneck bottle or industry standard bottle (ISB). The ISB longnecks have a uniform capacity, height, weight and diameter and can be reused on average 16 times. The U.S. ISB longneck is 355 mL (12.5 imp fl oz; 12.0 U.S. fl oz). In Canada, in 1992, the large breweries all agreed to use a 341 mL (12.0 imp fl oz; 11.5 U.S. fl oz) longneck bottle of standard design (named AT2), thus replacing the traditional stubby bottle and an assortment of brewery-specific long-necks which had come into use in the mid-1980s.

=== Large bottles ===
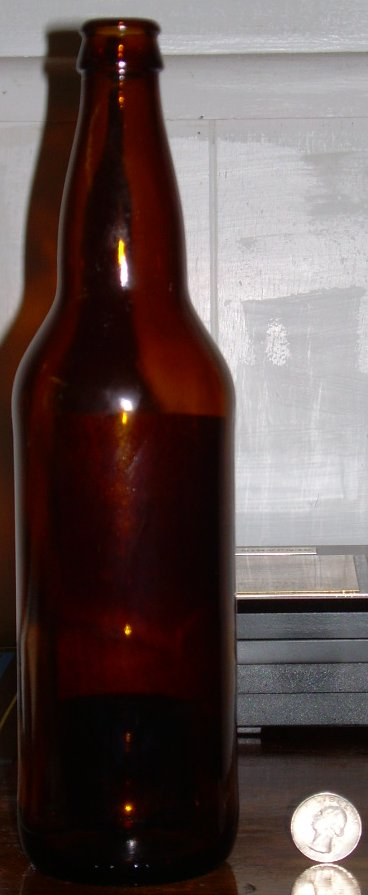
A 650 mL or 22oz "bomber"

In the United States and Canada, large bottles are 22 U.S. fl oz (650.6 mL; 22.9 imp fl oz), or one-sixth of a US gallon (colloquially called a "bomber," a "deuce deuce," or "double deuce"). Some breweries also choose to use 500 mL (16.9 U.S. fl oz; 17.6 imp fl oz) bottles, often for smaller batches of beer.

The European and Australian standard large bottle is 750-milliliter (25.4 U.S. fl oz; 26.4 imp fl oz) and is also used occasionally in Canada. In South Africa they are referred to as a "quart"; in Australia they are known colloquially as a "longneck","king brown", "tallie", "largie" or simply a "bottle". A liter and 1.25 L are also in use.

=== Forty ===
A "forty" is American slang for a 40-U.S.-fluid-ounce (1,200 mL; 42 imp fl oz) bottle commonly used for cheaper varieties of beer and of malt liquor, though some 32-U.S.-fluid-ounce (950 mL; 33 imp fl oz) bottles are erroneously called forties.

=== Growler ===
A growler (/ˈɡraʊlər/) is a glass, ceramic, or stainless steel jug used to transport draught beer in the United States, Canada, Australia, Brazil and other countries. They are commonly sold at breweries and brewpubs as a means to sell take-out craft beer.

In the United States, a growler is one-half US gallon (1.9 litres; 0.42 imperial gallons). Less commonly can be found "growlerettes" or "howlers", which are half-growlers, or 32 U.S. fl oz.

=== Small bottles ===
There are also smaller bottles, called nips, ponies (United States), cuartitos (Mexico, "small fourth", in reference to the larger 355 mL media "half"), throwdowns or grenades (Australia), among other names.

In the United States, the size of these bottles is usually 7 U.S. fl oz (207 mL), and are similar to the size of original Coca-Cola and Pepsi Cola bottles. The term pony dates to the 19th century, and is due to the diminutive size, being used earlier for a pony glass, and similarly for a pony keg. The best-known brands of ponies are Rolling Rock (pony introduced 1939)and Miller High Life (pony introduced 1972), and the 7 oz size of Rolling Rock likely contributed to the standardization on this size. Other major brands, such as Budweiser and Coors, are also regionally available in 7 oz bottles; these were introduced in the early 1970s, following the introduction of the size for Miller High Life.

The popularity of Rolling Rock ponies has led to the folk etymology that "pony" is from the Rolling Rock horse logo. This is incorrect: the term "pony of beer" in the United States predates Rolling Rock (introduced 1939) by over 50 years, and advertising for Rolling Rock from the 1950s uses the term "pony bottle" generically, stating "... Rolling Rock is the Largest Selling 7 oz. Pony Bottle of premium beer in Pennsylvania".

Among Mexican beers, Corona sells 7 U.S. fl oz (207 mL) ponies and 7.1 U.S. fl oz (210 mL) cuartitos, branded as Coronita, from the Spanish diminutive -ita. The American-market 7 oz. ponies come in 6-packs and the Mexican market 210 mL cuartitos come in boxes of 12.

In Australia, a limited range of beers are available in a 250 mL (8.8 imp fl oz; 8.5 U.S. fl oz) bottle, nicknamed a throwdown or grenade.

Pony bottles are most popular for the on-premises market, where they are sold by the bucketful. The motivation in the 1970s was to target lighter drinkers, and to ensure that the lager beer stayed cold until finished. The market for beer in small bottles is smaller than that in regular size bottles, which cause added difficulties and expense: the bottles themselves are harder to source, and require either a separate bottling line or retooling the bottling line between runs. As a result, US craft breweries only rarely bottle in small bottles; temporary examples include Flying Dog Brewery (2007–2009) and Rogue Ales (2009–2011, using extra bottles from Flying Dog).

=== "Darwin Stubby" ===
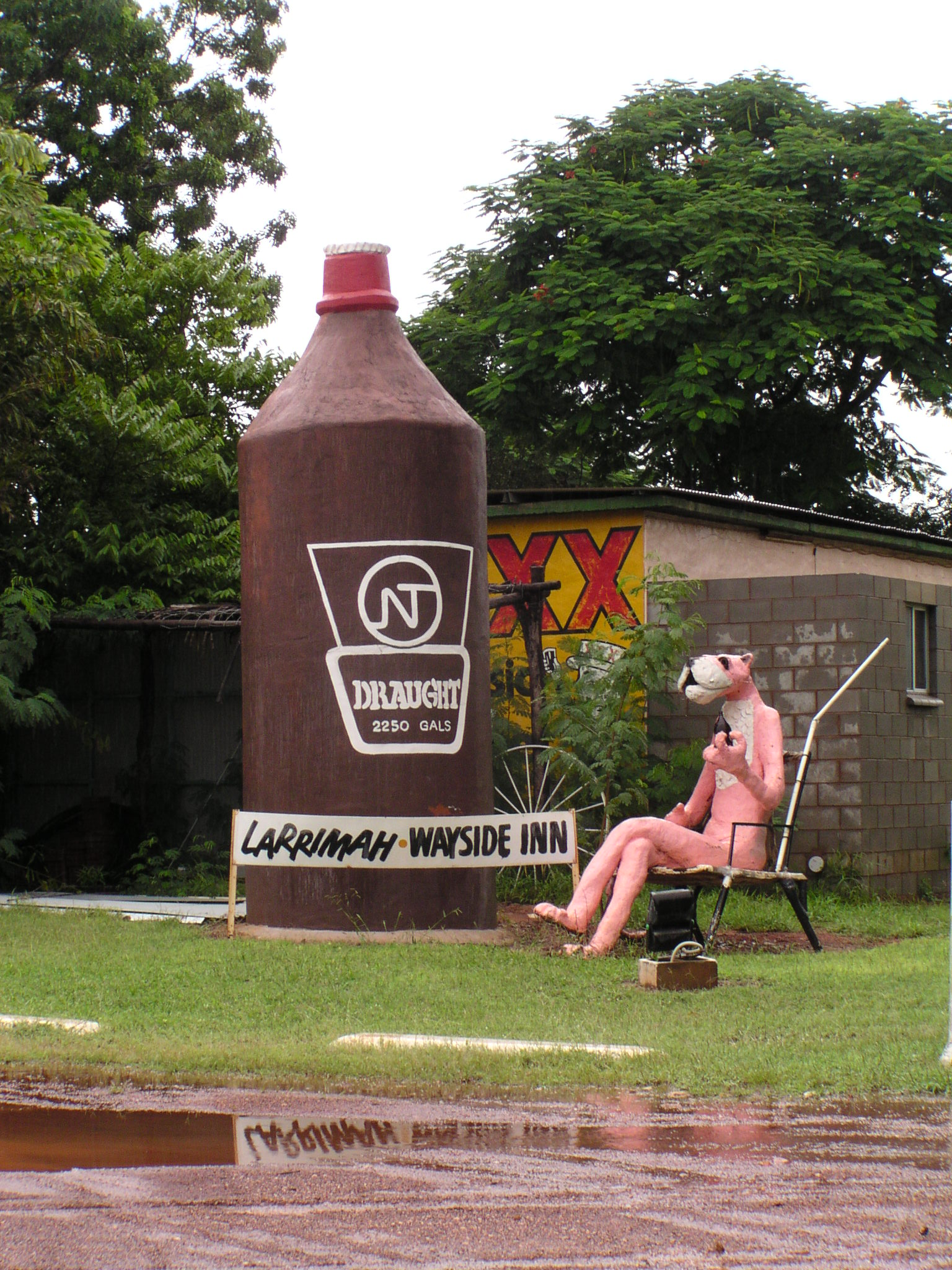
The Big Stubby at Larrimah

A Darwin Stubby refers to several particularly large beer bottle sizes in Australia. It was first introduced in April 1958 with an 80-imperial-fluid-ounce (2,270 mL; 76.9 U.S. fl oz) capacity. The 2-liter (70.4 imp fl oz; 67.6 U.S. fl oz) Darwin Stubby is available by NT Draught in the Northern Territory. The 2.25-liter (76.1 U.S. fl oz; 79.2 imp fl oz) Darwin Stubby has an iconic, if kitsch, status in Australian folklore.

=== "Caguama" and "Ballena" bottles ===
In Mexico, caguama and ballena are popular names for a 940 mL (33.1 imp fl oz; 31.8 U.S. fl oz) beer bottle. The beer brands that are sold in these bottles include Tecate, Carta Blanca, Sol, Indio, Victoria, Corona Familiar and Pacífico. The name "caguama" refers to the Loggerhead sea turtle, which is called "caguama" in Spanish, and is used mostly in central and eastern Mexico. There are larger sizes of beer bottle called a súper caguama or a caguamón. The name ballena is Spanish for whale, and is mostly used along the northern Pacific coast.

=== Gallery ===
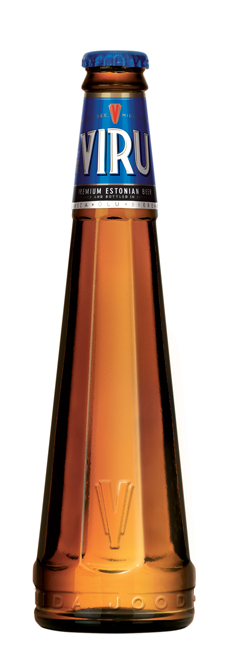
Cone-shaped bottle of an Estonian beer

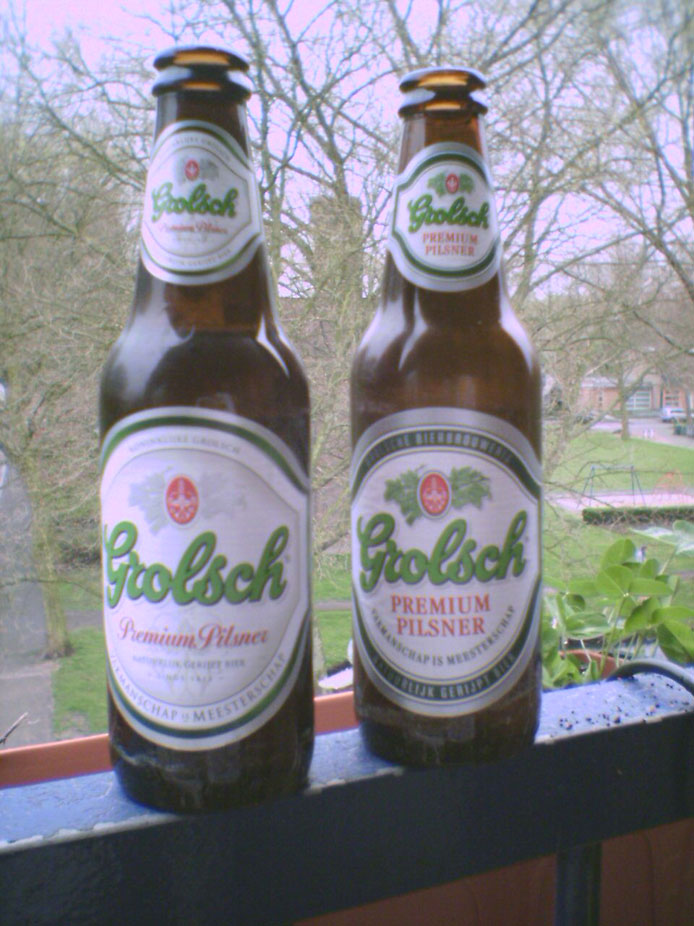
Two pijpjes

Darwin Stubbies in several variations

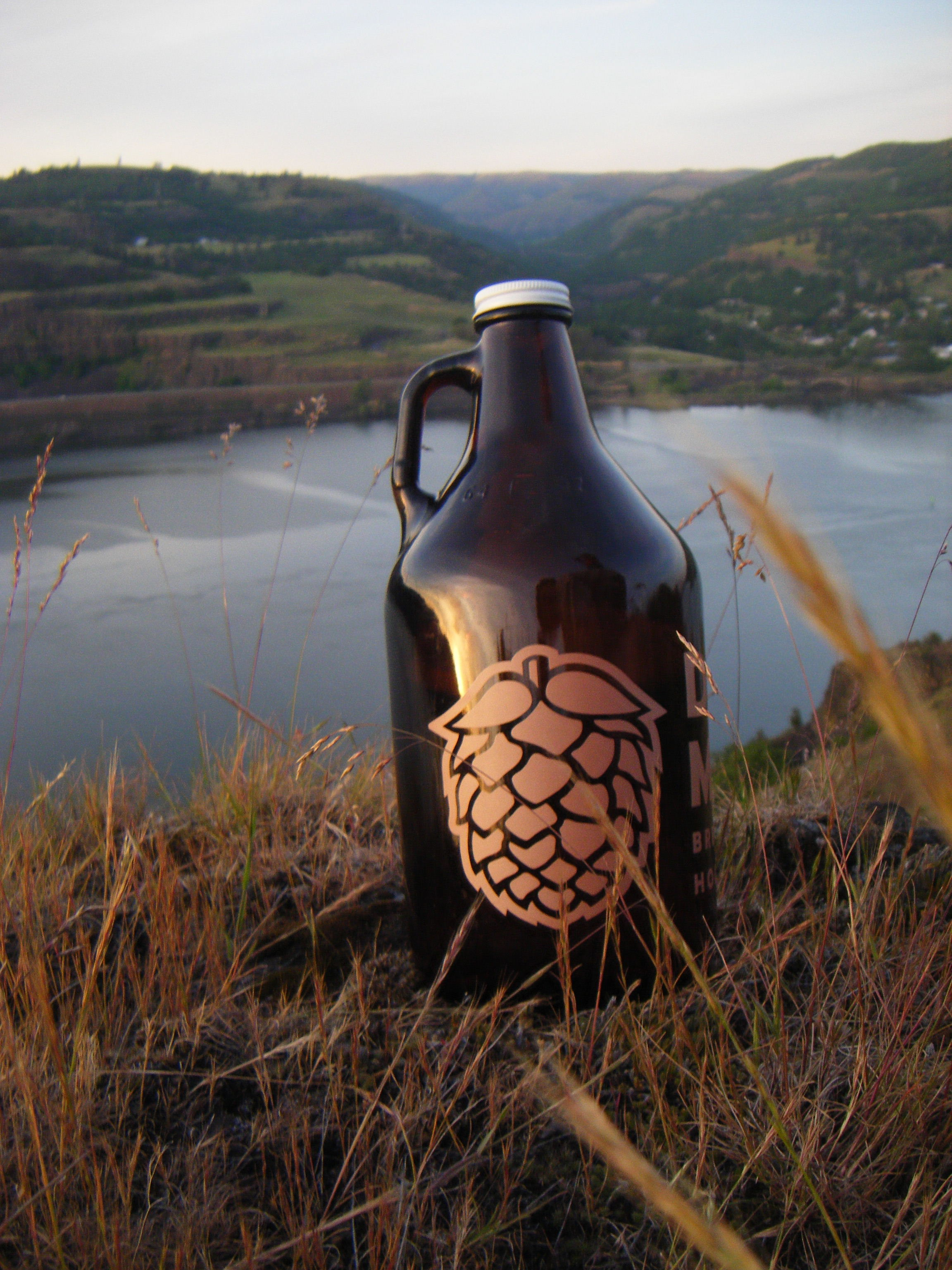
Half gallon growler

== Closure ==
Bottled beer is sold with several types of bottle cap, but most often with crown caps, also known as crown seals. Some beers (for example Grolsch) are sold in "beugel" style bottles, known as "flip-top" or "swing top" in some English speaking countries. A number of beers are sold finished with a cork and muselet (or cage), similar to champagne closures. These closures were largely superseded by the crown cap at the end of the 19th century, but survive in some styles, typically Lambic ales. Many larger beers, including most forties and some growlers, use screw caps due to their resealing design.

=== Gallery ===
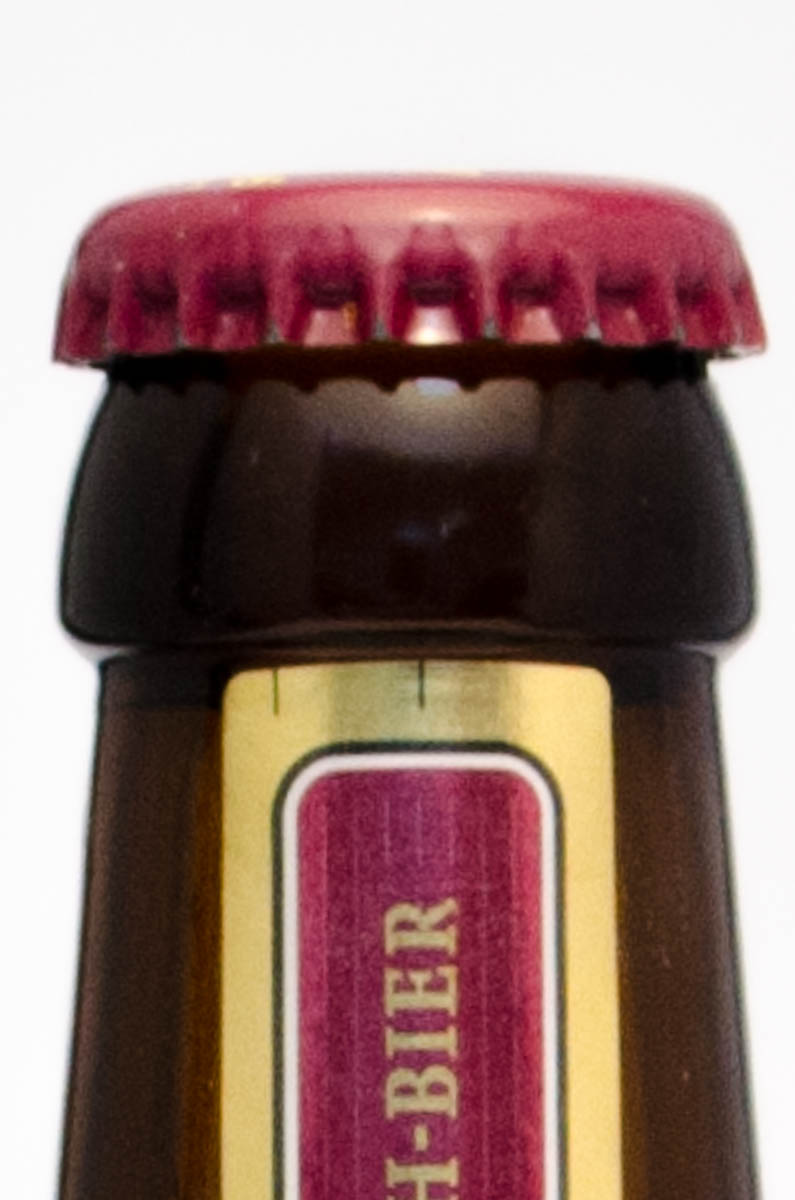
Crown cap, unopened

Video of homebrewers bottling beer using crown caps

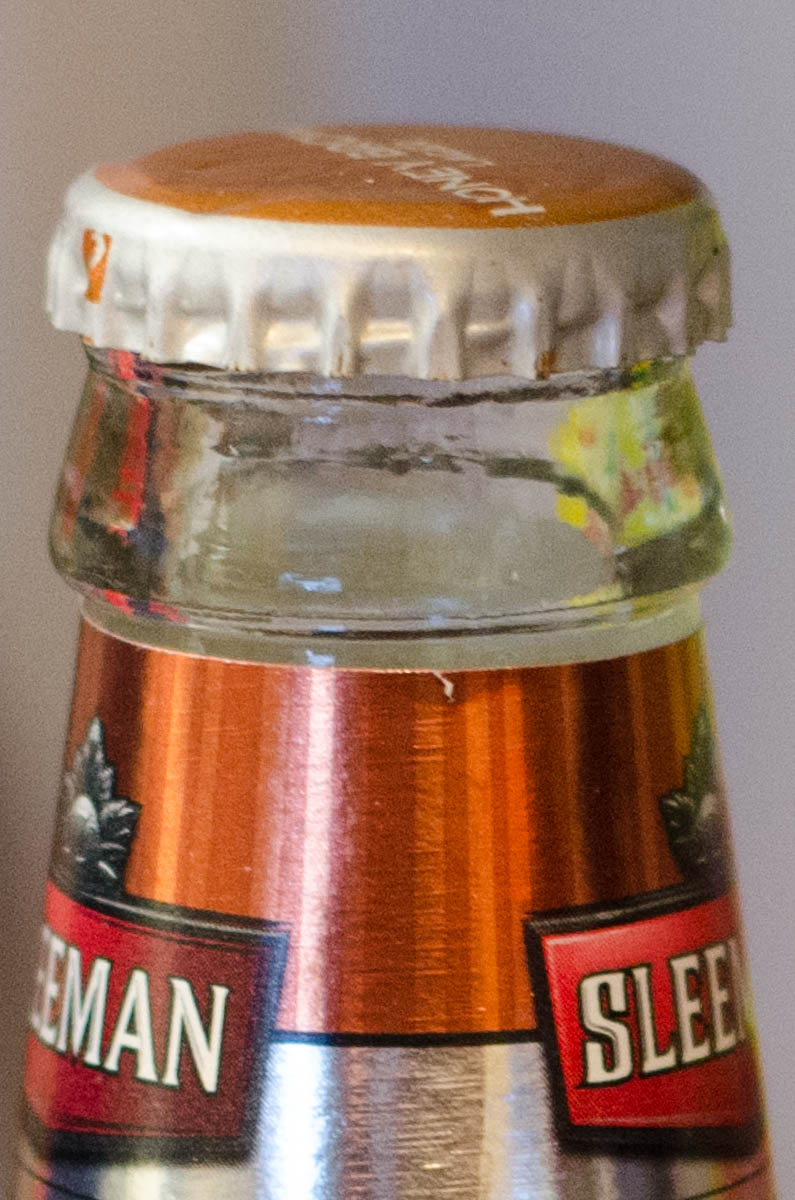
Twist off beer bottle cap, unopened

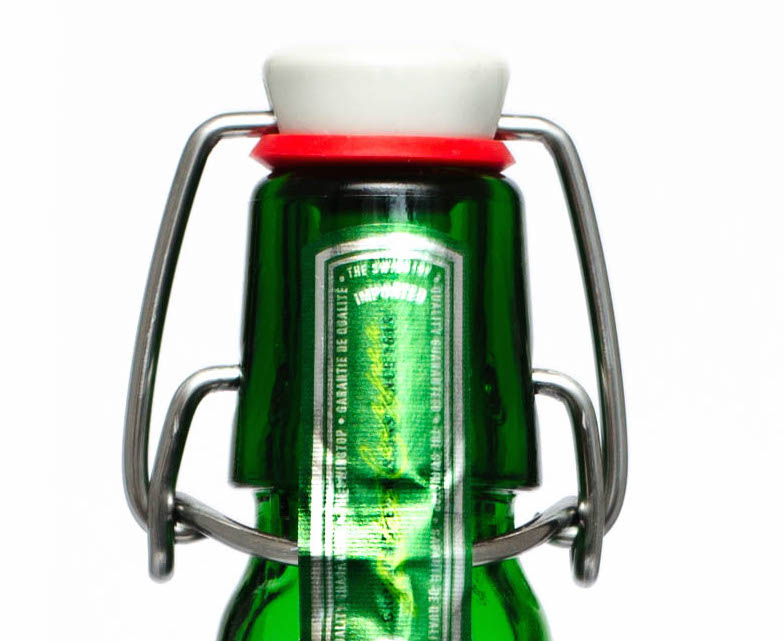
Swing top beer bottle closure, unopened

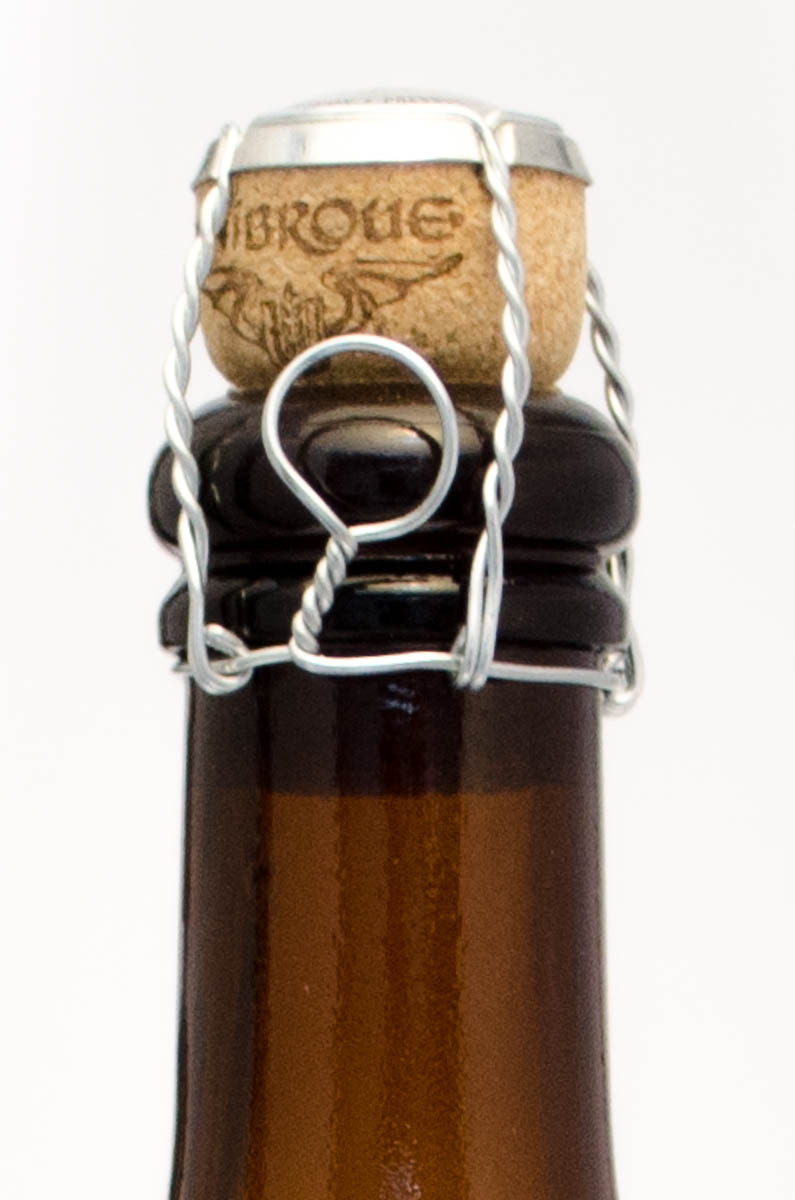
Cork and wirehood closure, unopened

== Bottle fermentation ==
Some beers undergo a fermentation in the bottle, giving natural carbonation. These beers are usually referred to as bottle-conditioned. They are bottled with a viable yeast population in suspension and to start what may be a second or third fermentation. If there is no residual fermentable sugar left, sugar and or wort may be added in a process known as priming. The resulting fermentation generates CO_{2} that is trapped in the bottle, remaining in solution and providing natural carbonation. Bottle-conditioned beers may be either filled unfiltered direct from the fermentation or conditioning tank, or filtered and then reseeded with yeast.

== Use as weapons ==
Beer bottles are sometimes used as makeshift clubs, for instance in bar fights. As with pint glasses, the use of glass bottles as weapons is known as glassing. Pathologists determined in 2009 that beer bottles are strong enough to crack human skulls, which requires an impact energy of between 14 and 70 joules, depending on the location. Empty beer bottles shatter at 40 joules, while full bottles shatter at only 30 joules because of the pressure of the carbonated beer inside the bottle. A test performed by the television show MythBusters suggested that full bottles are significantly more dangerous than empty bottles. They concluded that full bottles inflict more damage in terms of concussion and skull fracture. However, they found that both full and empty bottles do the same amount of scalp damage.

As with pint glasses, the main solution to glassing with bottles is not to dispense glass bottles where there is risk of fights or accidents, most simply either using plastic glasses or plastic bottles (or aluminium cans).

== Lightstruck beer ==
Lightstruck, or "skunked" or "skunky", beer has been exposed to ultraviolet and visible light. The light causes riboflavin to react with and break down isohumulones, chemicals that contribute to the bitterness of the beer and are derived from the hops. A molecule resulting from a subsequent chain of reactions, prenylthiol, is very similar chemically and in odor to the musk-borne mercaptans that are a skunk's natural defences. It has also been identified as the primary odorant in cannabis that contributes to its skunk-like aroma.

In some cases, such as Miller High Life, a hops extract that does not have isohumulones is used to bitter the beer so it cannot be "lightstruck". A dark brown glass bottle gives some protection to the beer, but green and clear glass bottles offer virtually no protection at all.

There are also other solutions available to prevent beer bottled in clear and green glass from becoming skunked or light-struck, such as taller walls on 6-pack carriers, which is common with craft beers and highlighted in Samuel Adams marketing.

== See also ==
- Aluminum bottle
- Aluminum can
- Beer in Australia
- Beverage can
- Bottle recycling
- Box wine
- Container-deposit legislation
- Glass container industry
- Widget (beer)
- Wine bottle
