= Linh Phước Temple =

Temple in Vietnam

Coordinates: 11°56′39.42″N 108°29′58.2″E

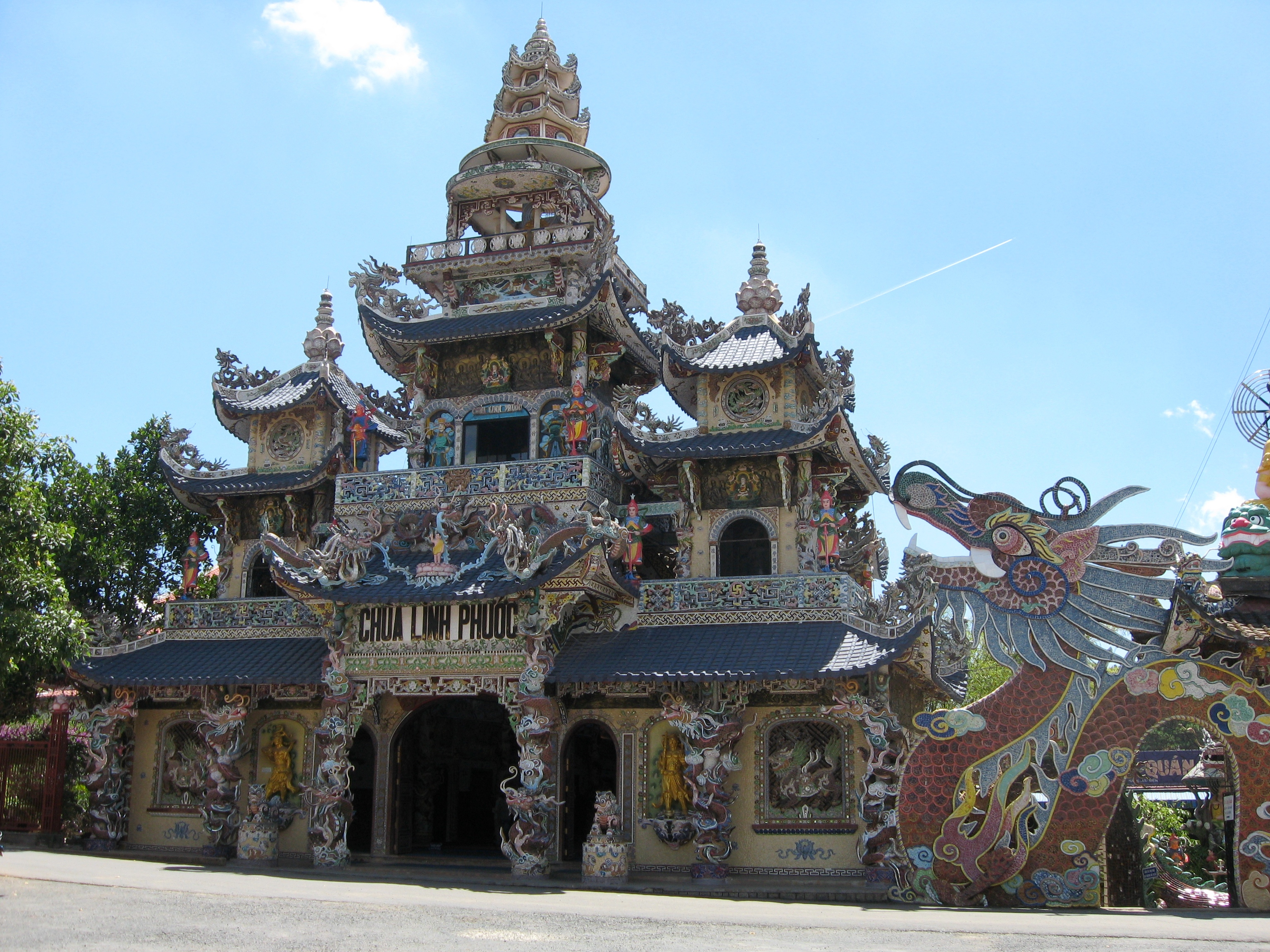
Front of Linh Phước Temple

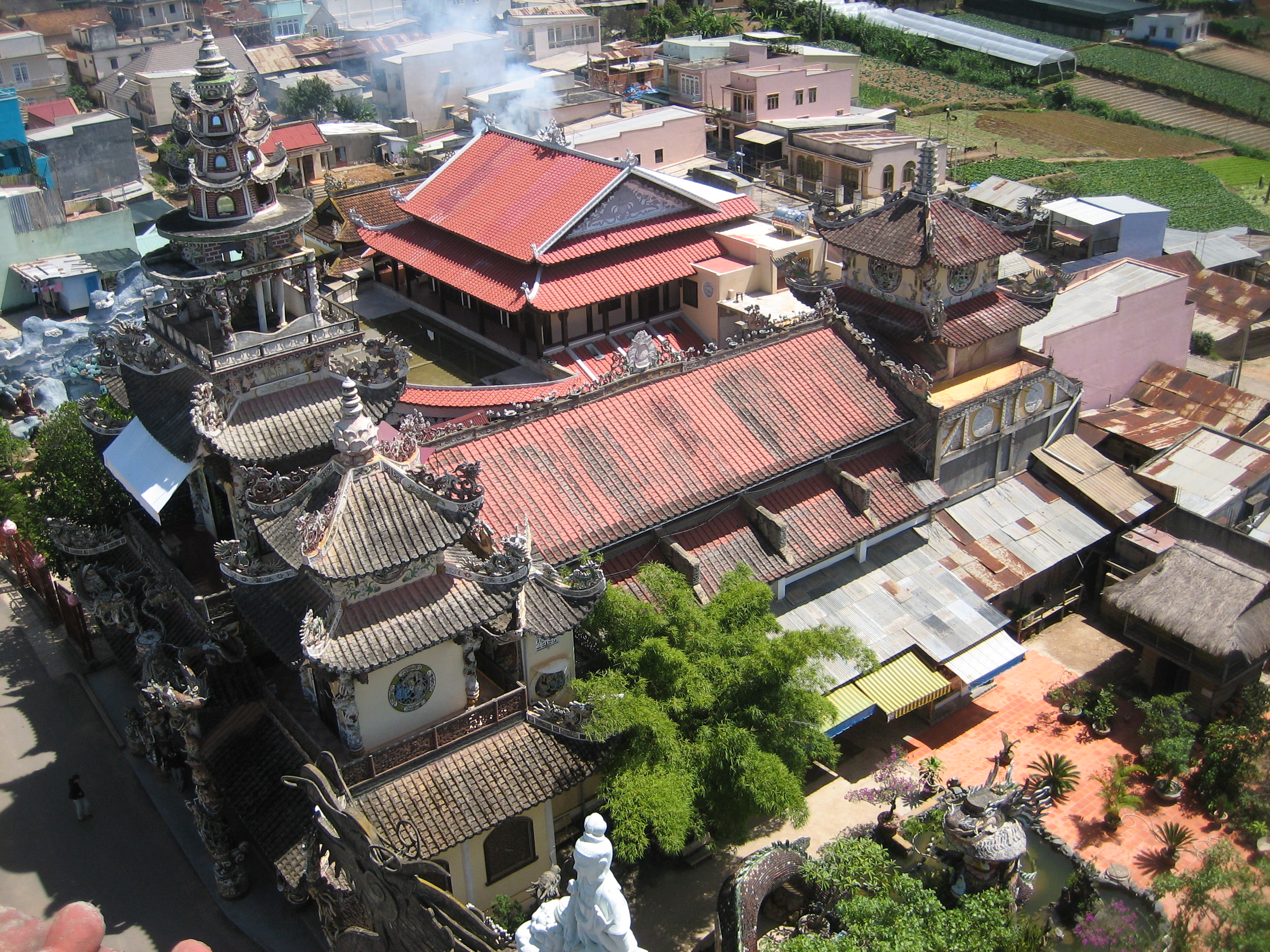
Linh Phước Temple seen from above

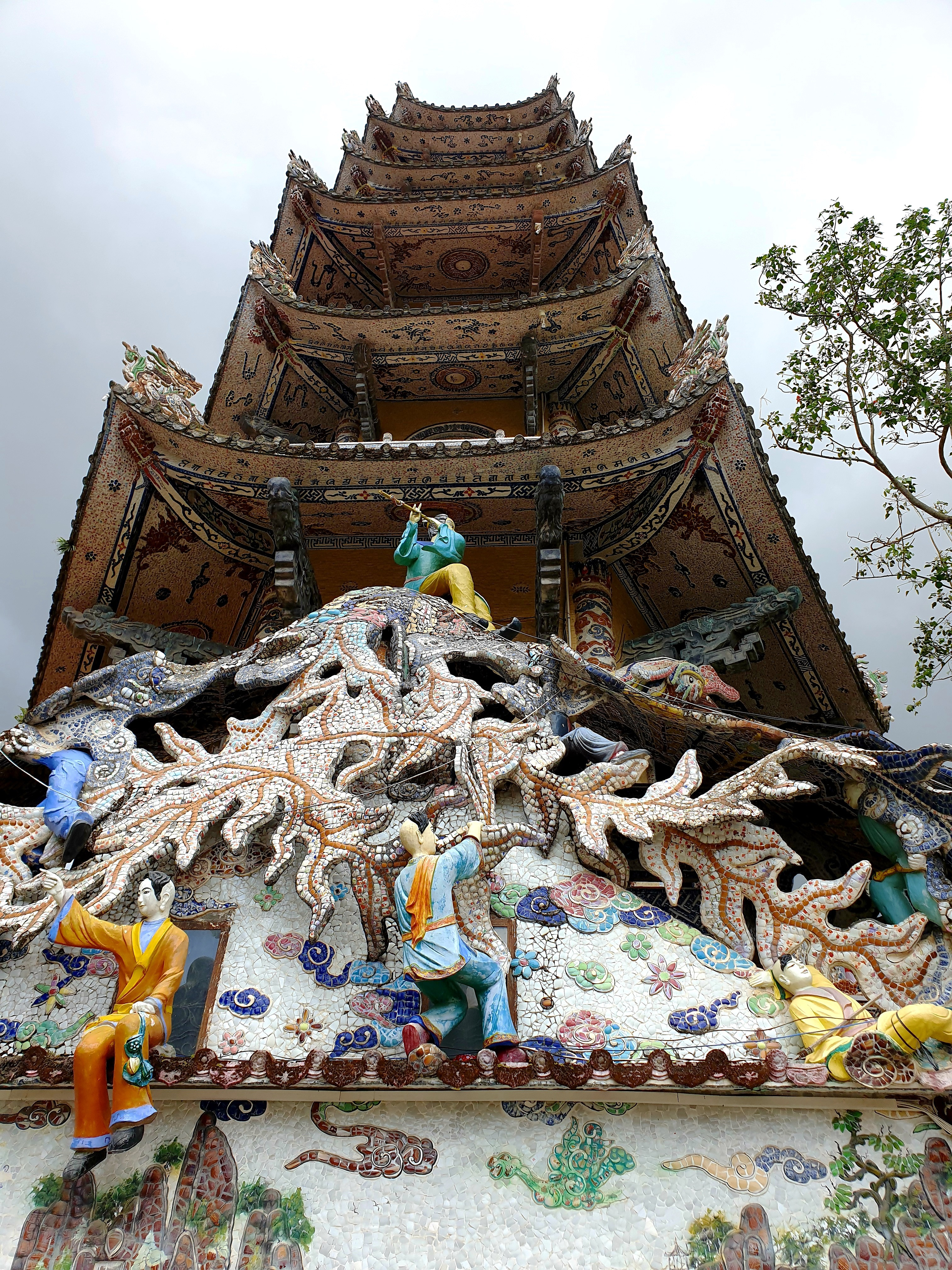
Linh Phước Pagoda

Linh Phước Temple (Vietnamese: Chùa Linh Phước, Chữ Hán: 靈福寺, IPA: [t͡ɕûə̯ līŋ fwə̂kˀ]), also known as Ve Chai Temple, is located at No. 120 Tu Phuoc, Trai Mat District, Vietnam, 8 km from Da Lat city center, on Highway 20. The 49-meter-long dragon temple is made of 12,000 bottles; the dragon's head is 7 metres high. Linh Phuoc Pagoda is considered a special architectural mosaic of Da Lat city.

== History ==
Construction on the temple was started in 1949, and completed in 1952. In 1990, Ven. Thich Tam Vi restored the temple and built more new buildings.

Linh Phuoc Pagoda has had five abbots over the course of its history:

- The Most Venerable Thich Minh The (1951–1954)
- The Most Venerable Thich An Hoa (1954–1956)
- Most Venerable Thich Quang Phat (1956–1959)
- Most Venerable Thich Minh Duc (1959–1985)
- Venerable Thich Tam Vi (from 1985 to present)

== Architecture ==
The 33 m long and 12-metre wide main hall features 2 rows of cobblestone mosaics. On top of it are many mosaic bas-reliefs featuring the history of Shakyamuni and the histories of the Lotus Sutras. The temple grounds (Hoa Long Vien) have a dragon of length 49 m, the dragon enclosure is made of 12,000 beer bottles, and the dragon mouth covers the Maitreya Buddha. In front of the temple grounds is a 37 m high seven-storeyed tower, which is considered the highest temple bell tower in Vietnam. In the heart of the Dai Hong Chung tower is a 4.3 m high bell that is considered the heaviest bell in Vietnam; it is 2.33 m wide, weighs 8,500 kg, and was cast in 1999. In front of the temple is Quan The Am. There is also a gem display, antique chinaware and fine art furniture.
