= C5H10S =

The molecular formula C_{5}H_{10}S (molar mass: 102.20 g/mol, exact mass: 102.0503 u) may refer to:

- Thiane
- Prenylthiol, also known as 3-methyl-2-butene-1-thiol
