= Pony glass =

Small drinking glass or measure

A pony glass may mean one of two types of small glassware:

- A quarter-pint glass of beer: 5 imp fl oz (142 ml), metricated to 140 ml in Australia.
- A small, stemmed glass of about one ounce, similar to a stemmed shot glass. Used for liqueurs or cordials, hence also called a "cordial glass" or "liqueur glass".
- A bar measure that is half of a jigger, used to measure a cordial. A pony traditionally held 1 imp fl oz (28 ml), and is attached to the bottom of a jigger measure, which held 2 imp fl oz (57 ml). In modern times, however, both the size and ratio of the jigger to pony varies widely.

== Name ==
The name "pony" is due to the small size, and dates to the 19th century. Similar terms include pony bottle and pony keg.

== History ==
The pony as a measure reached its apex around the end of the 19th century, which also happened to be a golden age of barware.
