= De Groen family =

de Groen

The de Groen family owned the Grolsch brewery in the Netherlands (founded 1615) from 1895 to 2008 before selling out to SABMiller for 800+ million Euros.

== The family ==
Andries (II), Theo, Frans (I), Hein, Herman and Jan were the grandchildren of Theo de Groen, who bought the company in 1895. They were the key contributors to the growth after the Second World War, and bought the brewery in Enschede. The family can be traced back to 1647 and has its roots in Cuijk. Both Andries (III) and Frans (II) son's were active in the brewery but have retired since the acquisition of SABMiller. Family de Groen is listed in the Quote 500 published by Quote magazine.

Since the sale of Grolsch, Andries (III), Andries (IV) and Frans (II) have been active rebuilding a brewing and malting business. In 2013 they invested in a special malt production facility, The Swaen in the Netherlands. They also invested in a brewery in the United States and Belgium.
