= NT Draught =

Australian lager

- 375 ml (13.20 imp fl oz; 12.68 US fl oz) stubby bottle, 4.9% ABV
- Manufacturer: Carlton & United Beverages (Asahi Breweries)
- Introduced: 1957
- Alcohol by volume: 4.9%
- Style: Lager
- Website: cub.com.au/beer/nt-draught/

NT Draught is a lager produced by Carlton & United Breweries (CUB), a subsidiary of Asahi Breweries. NT Draught are the makers of the Darwin Stubby. A Darwin Stubby refers to several large beer bottle sizes in Australia. It was first introduced in April 1958 with an 80-imperial-fluid-ounce (2,270 ml; 76.9 U.S. fl oz) capacity. The 2.25-litre (76.1 U.S. fl oz; 79.2 imp fl oz) Darwin Stubby has an iconic, if kitsch status in Australian folklore. In May 2015 Carlton & United Breweries announced that they will no longer brew NT Draught on a regular basis.

== History ==
Darwin's first brewery, designated "Darwin Brewery", was founded in 1951 by Harry Ellis-Kells in the Berrimah industrial area, 3 miles from Darwin's GPO, and before long was producing four kinds of beer: Buffalo Bitter, Palmerston Dinner Ale, Darwin Ale and Darwin Lager. Ellis-Kells "skipped town" in August that year after being successfully sued by contractor E. Favaro for £359. In 1952 the property was sold to brothers Bernard and John Lyall Allen, who floated a company to purchase the site from them and to erect additional buildings, procure equipment and hire staff to re-commence brewing at the site, but due to insufficient interest, the venture was called off.

In 1956 Carlton & United Breweries established their Darwin brewery, N.T. Brewery Pty. Ltd., in the suburb of Berrimah. The first beer, Carlton Draught, was brewed on 13 October of that year. The brewery, however, did not have an associated bottling plant, so bottled beer still had to be shipped from Melbourne. Due to the logistics of shipping bottles such a long distance, the company decided in April 1958 to introduce a bigger bottle, a 2,270 ml (80 imp fl oz; 77 US fl oz) bottle, which became known as the "Darwin Stubby".

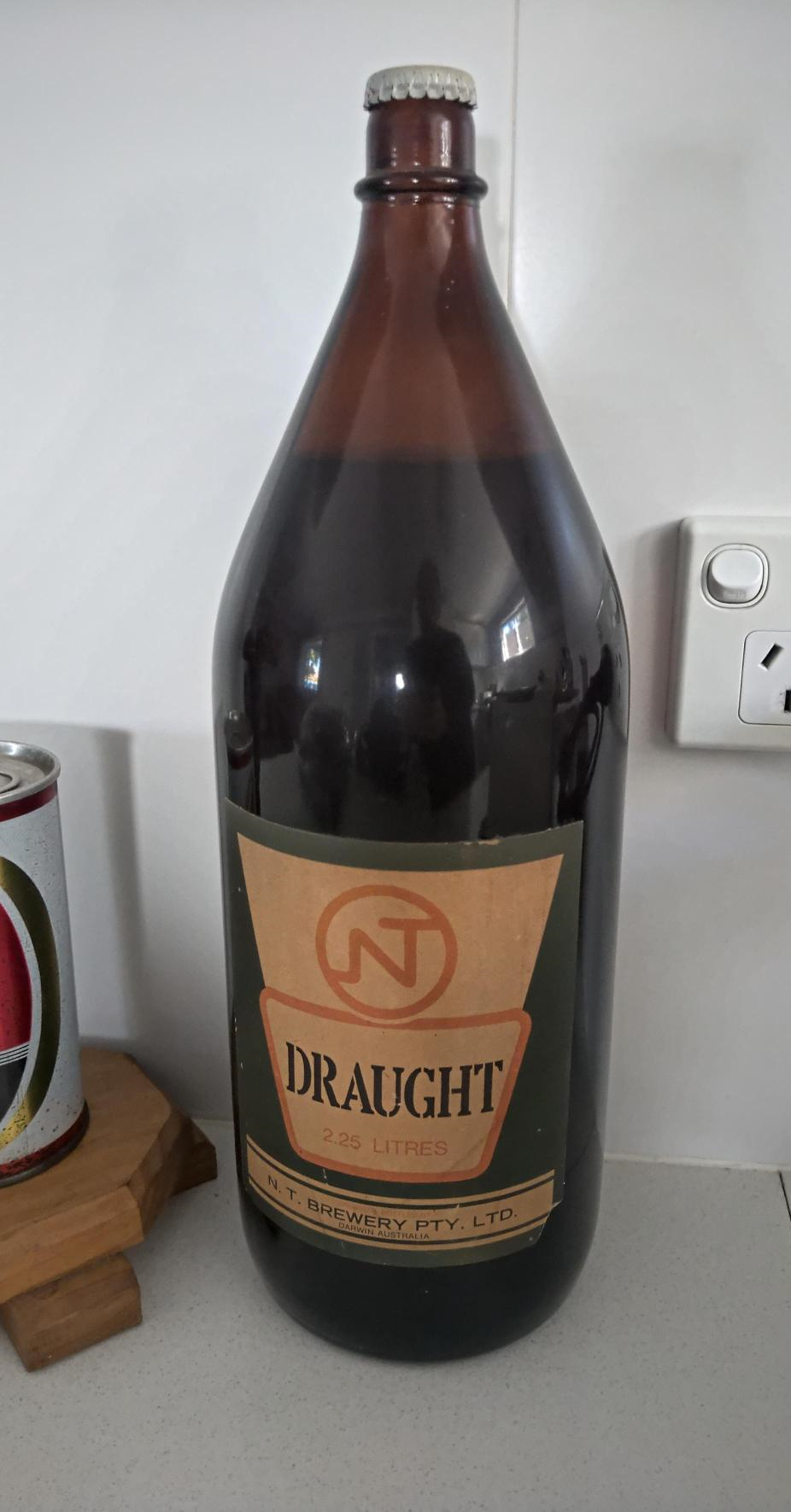
Darwin stubby c. 1981 with interim paper label following merger

At that time most hotels in the Darwin area were owned by the Swan Brewing Company of Western Australia, which preferred to sell its own beer from these outlets, so the "Darwin Stubby" was only available from one or two independent hotels and licensed stores, mostly grocers and supermarkets.

In 1981 Swan Brewery and CUB formed a merged entity Northern Territory Breweries Pty Ltd. In 1981 CUB bought out Swan's interest leaving it in sole control of the Northern Territory beer market. The Darwin brewery closed in 1989 however NT Draught continued to be brewed from the company's Melbourne brewery. In October 1996 CUB acquired the 200,000 hl Darwin Brewery in Winnellie from Goldchill Brewing, and commenced production of Victoria Bitter and Carlton Light for the Northern Territory in November. The brewery also produced NT Draught in the Darwin Stubby.

In May 2015 Carlton & United Breweries announced that due to decreasing volumes and increasing costs that it would be ceasing production of NT Draught. The company did advise that it would become one of their heritage beers and they would investigate bringing it out in special runs.

== See also ==
- List of breweries in Australia
