= Flip-top =

Bottle closure device

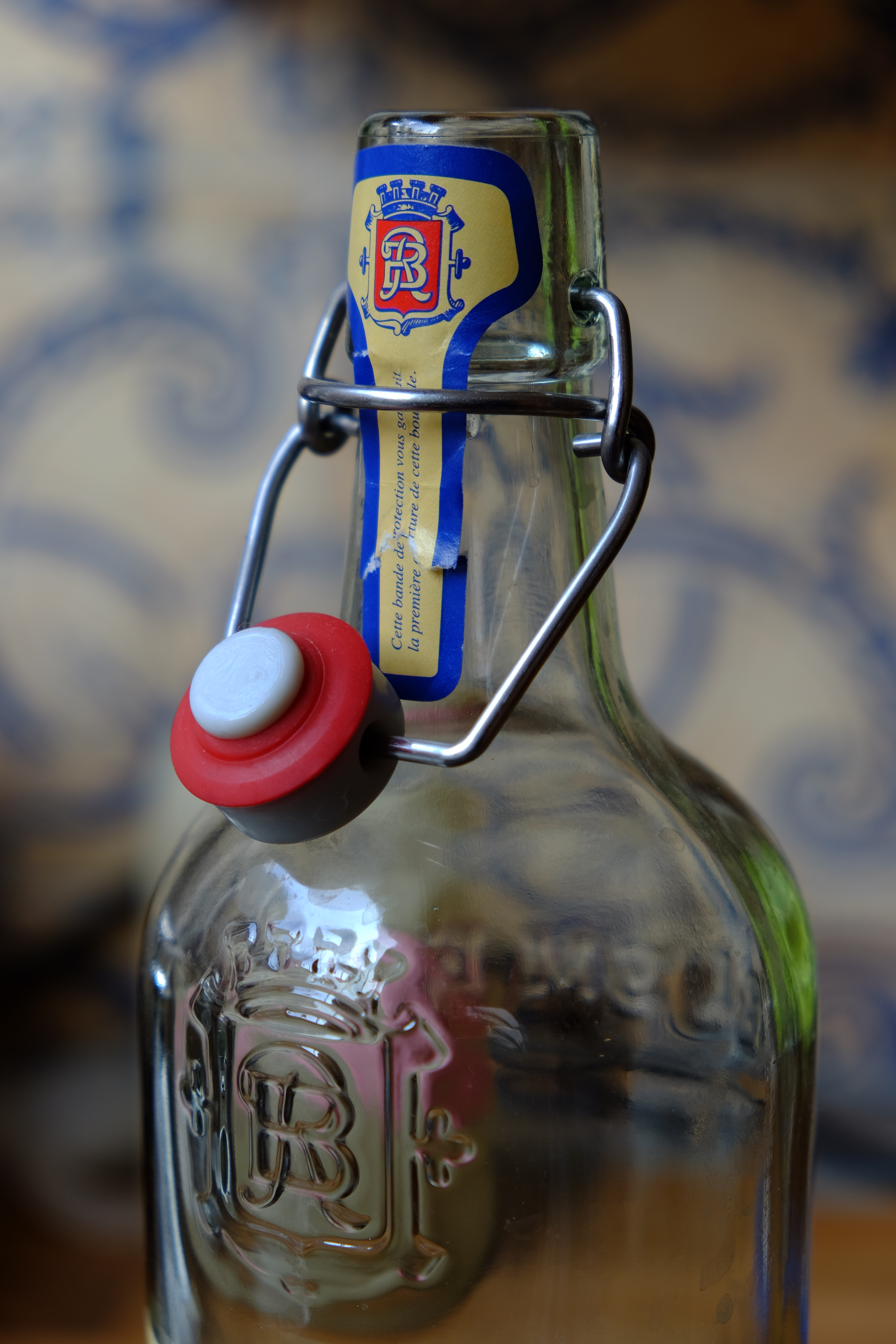
The top of a flip-top bottle

Breaking the seal on a Flip-top

A flip-top, swing-top, lightning toggle, or Quillfeldt stopper (after the inventor, Charles de Quillfeldt) is a type of bail closure frequently used for bottles containing carbonated beverages, such as beer or mineral water. The mouth of the bottle is sealed by a stopper, usually made of porcelain or plastic, fitted with a rubber gasket and held in place by a permanently attached wire bail. The bottle can be opened and resealed repeatedly without the use of a bottle opener, with the wires acting in the same way as a latch clamp. The flip-top was the dominant method of sealing beer and mineral water bottles prior to the invention of the crown cork.

== History ==
Prior to the creation of the flip-top bottle, bottles were often made from blown glass and sealed with a cork, which was difficult to open by hand and often unreliable, particularly for carbonated beverages such as mineral water or beer.

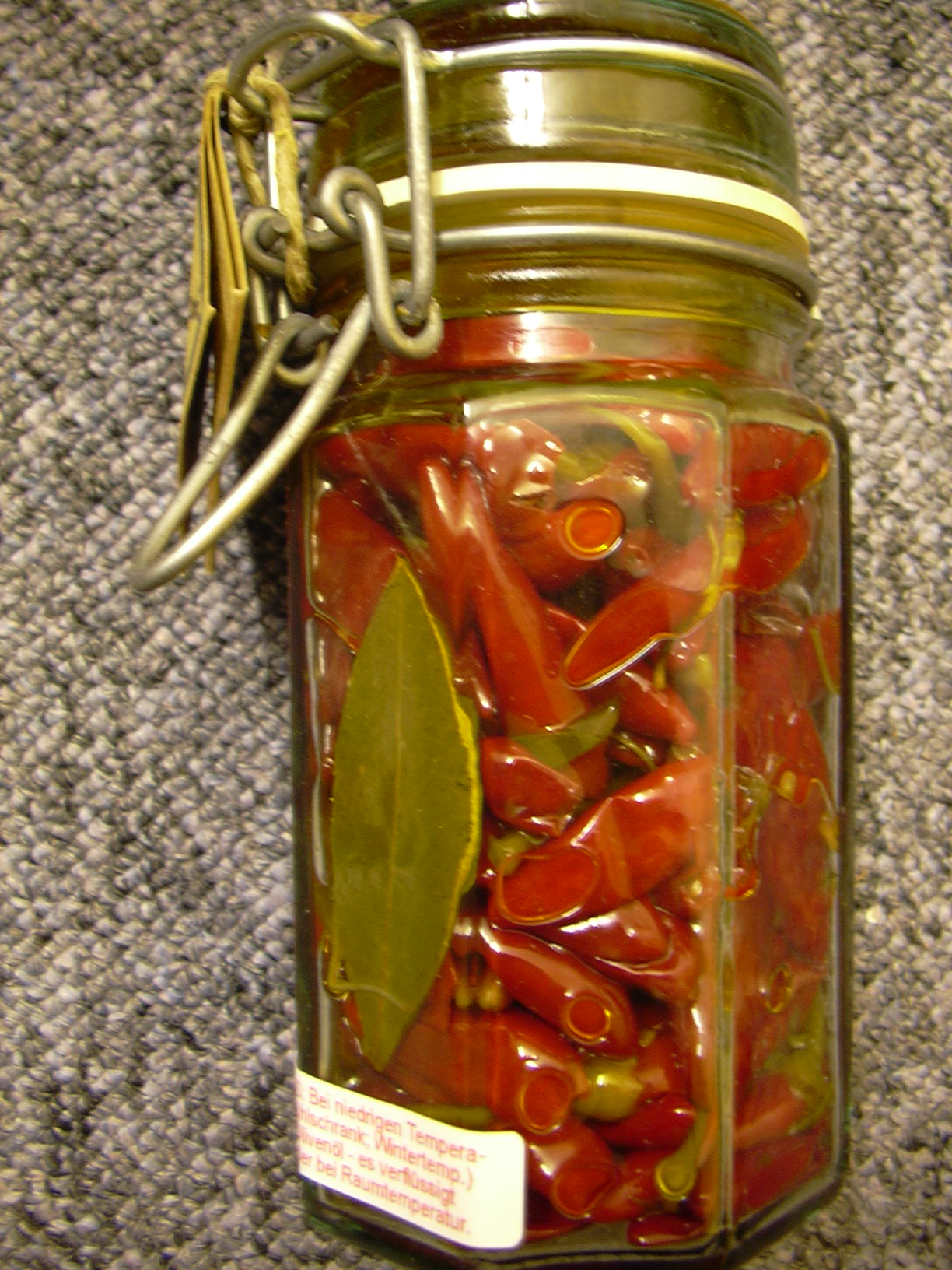
"Bail" closure

A precursor to the flip-top, the "bail" or "Kilner" closure was invented in 1859, where a lid with gasket was held by a wire harness and sealed by a separate set of wires.

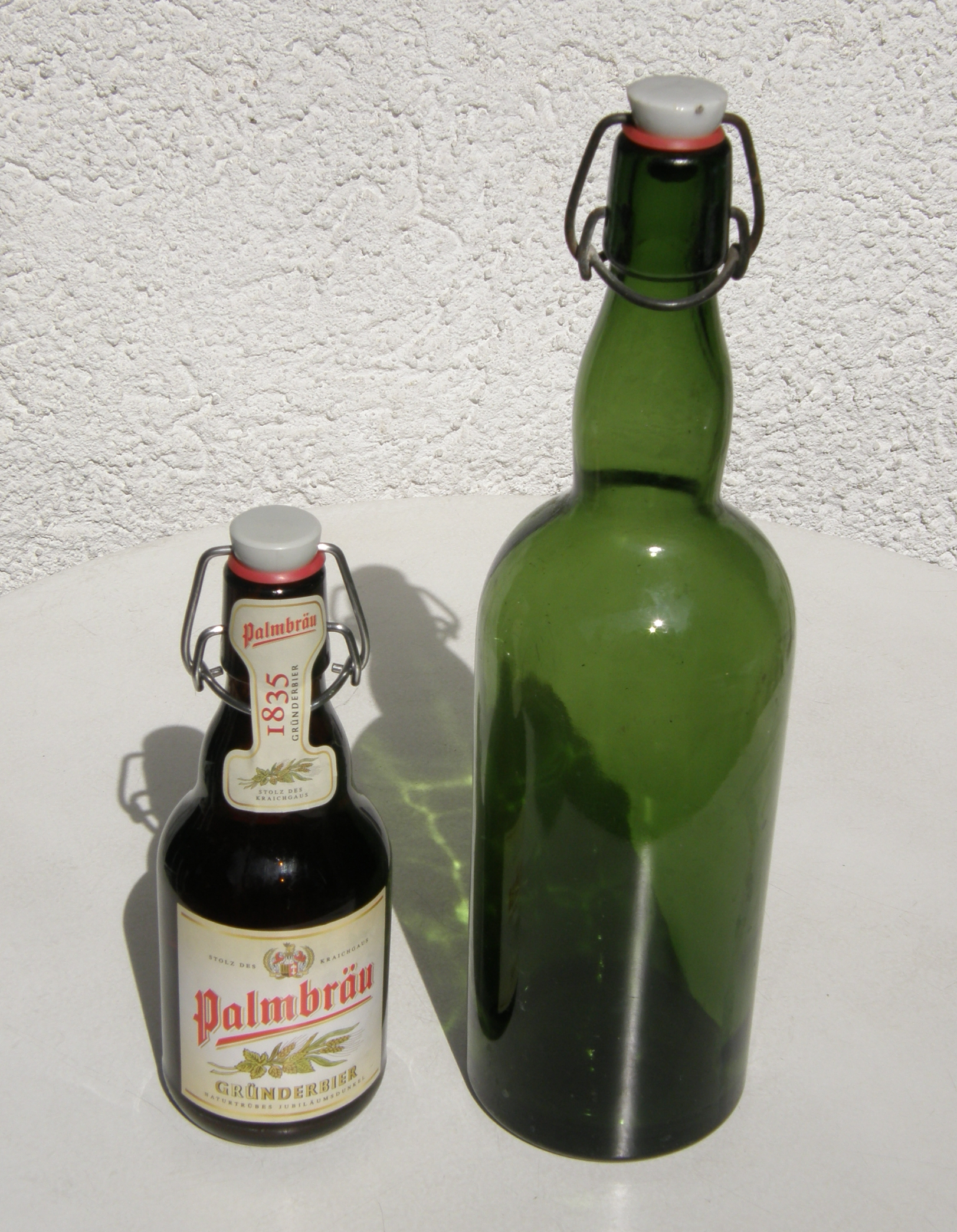
Examples of flip-top bottles

The first flip-top closure was created by Charles de Quillfeldt in the United States, who filed for a patent on 30 November 1874. The rights were purchased by Henry W. Putnam who adapted the design for use on fruit jars. He received a patent 25 April 1882, called "Trademark Lightning" and the jars became known as the lightning jars. Several other varieties have been developed.

Many homebrewers prefer flip-top bottles, since they are easy to close after filling, and negate the need of a separate capping device.

== Gallery ==
Various flip-top closures

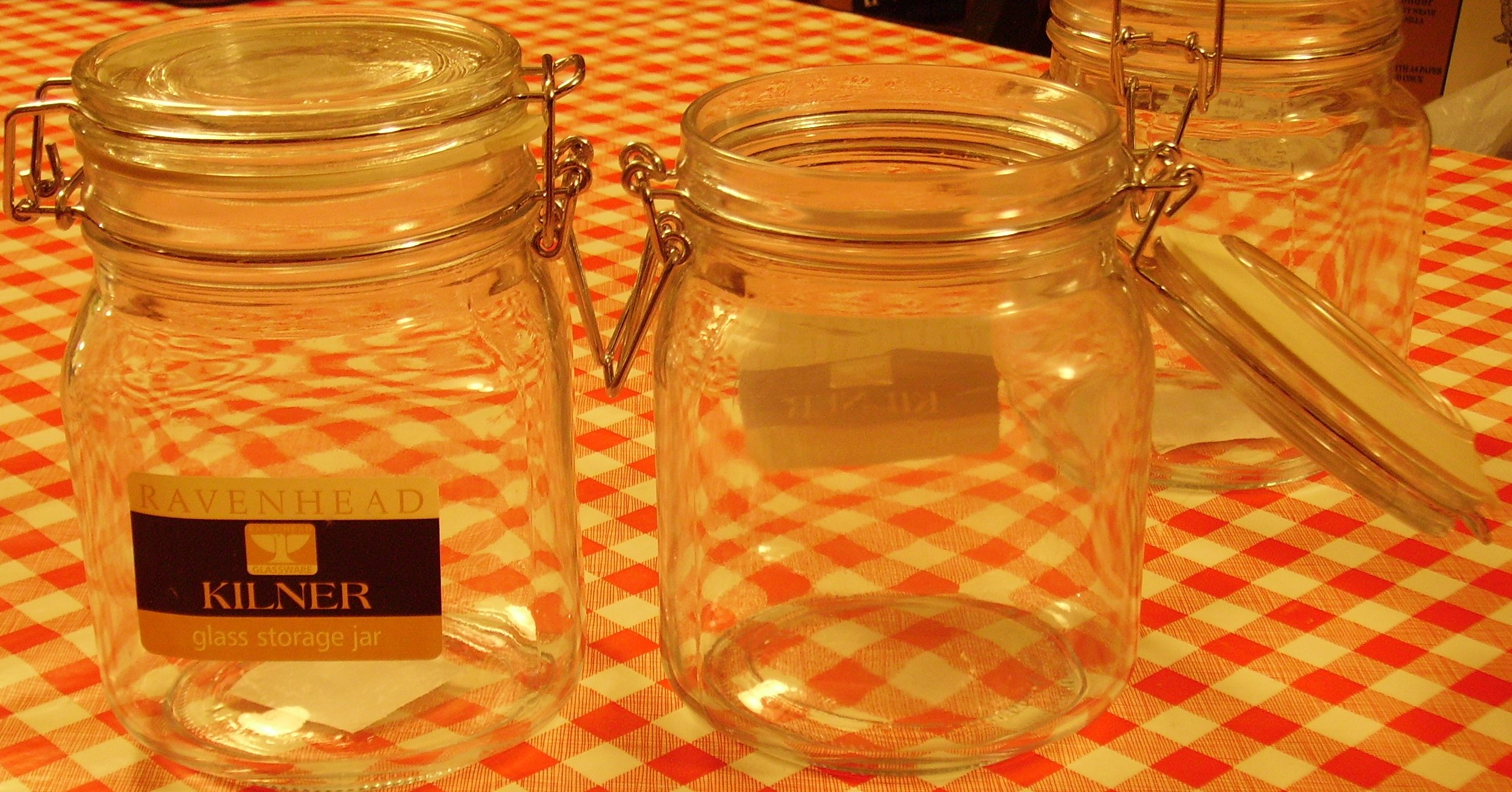
Preserving jar with bail closure, opened and closed

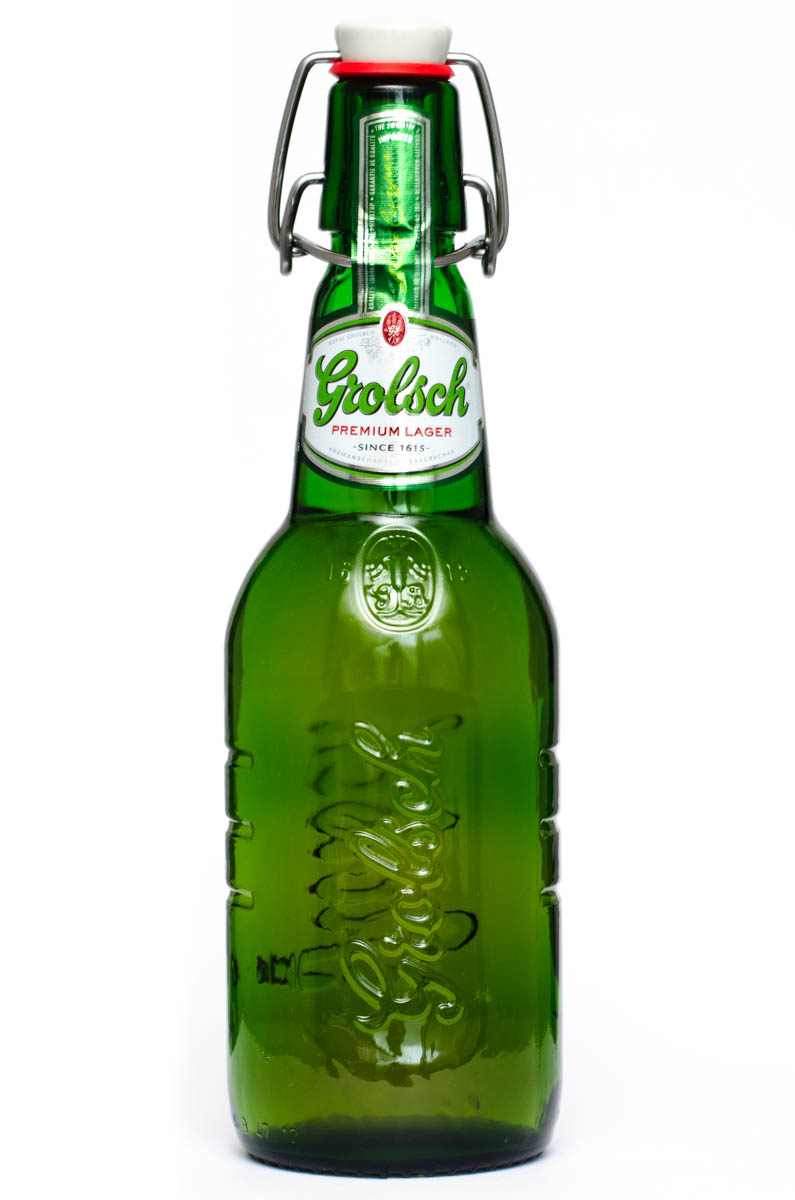
Unopened Grolsch beer bottle

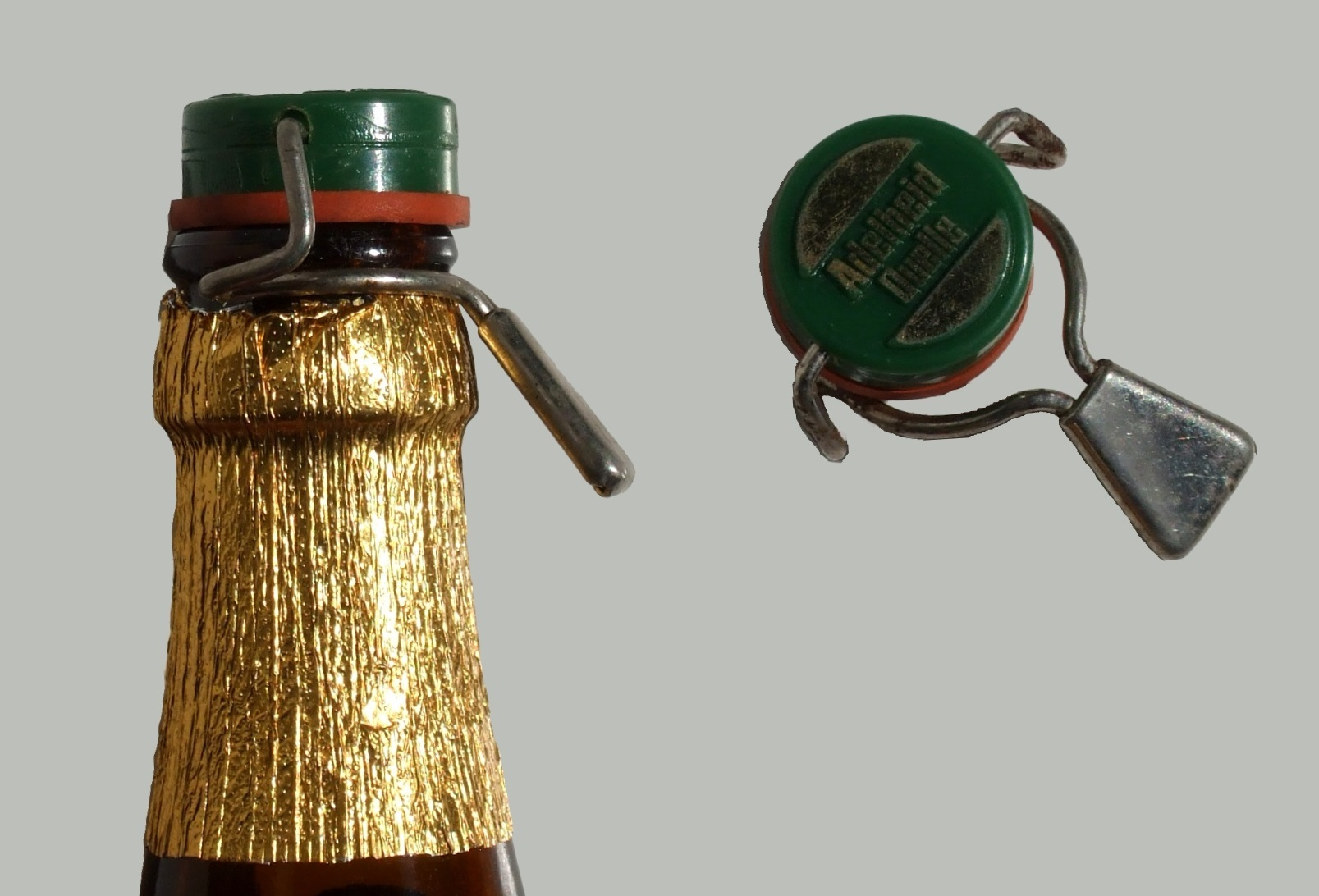
Flip-top seal used for crown cork bottles

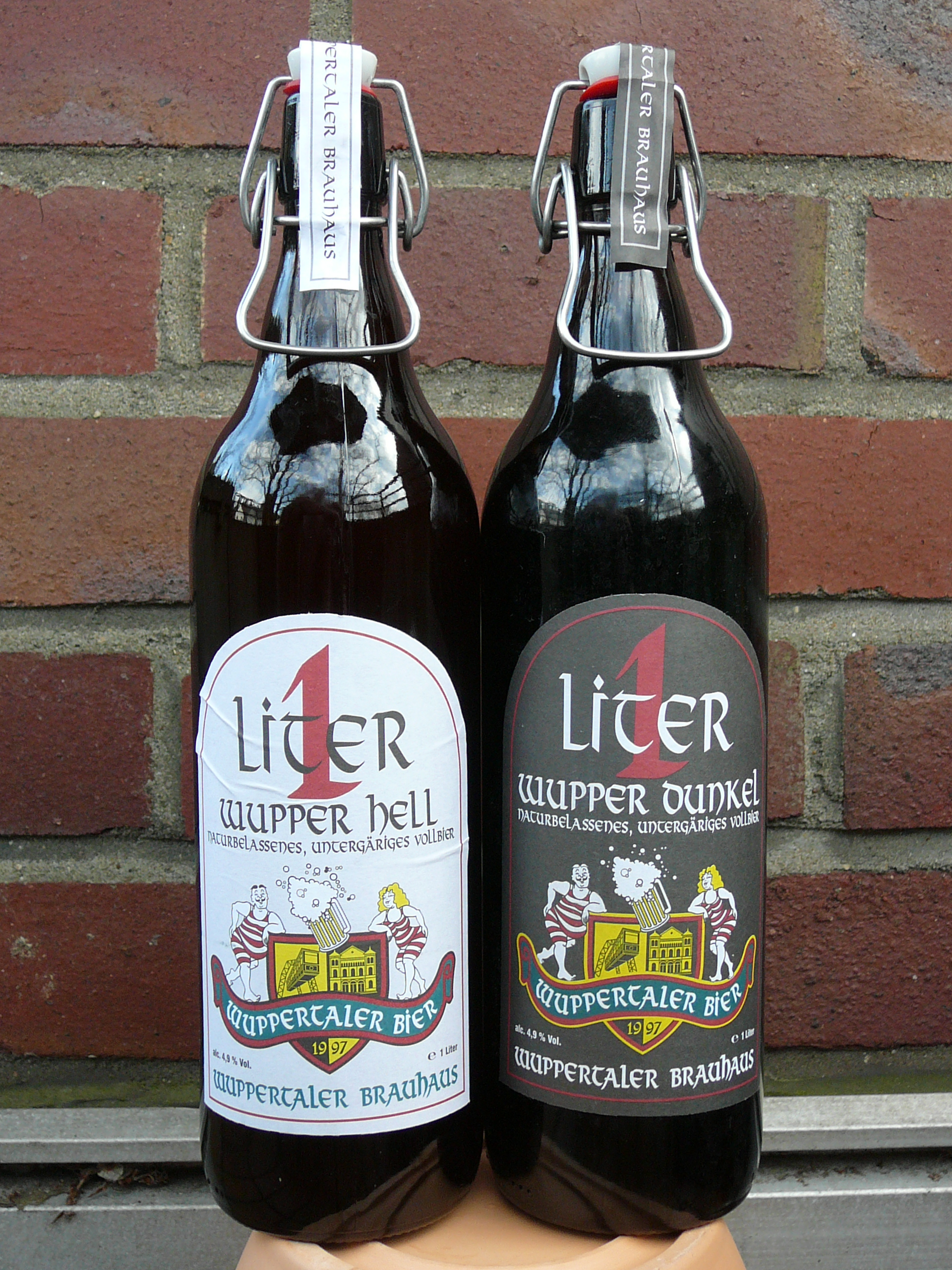
Flip-top beer bottles

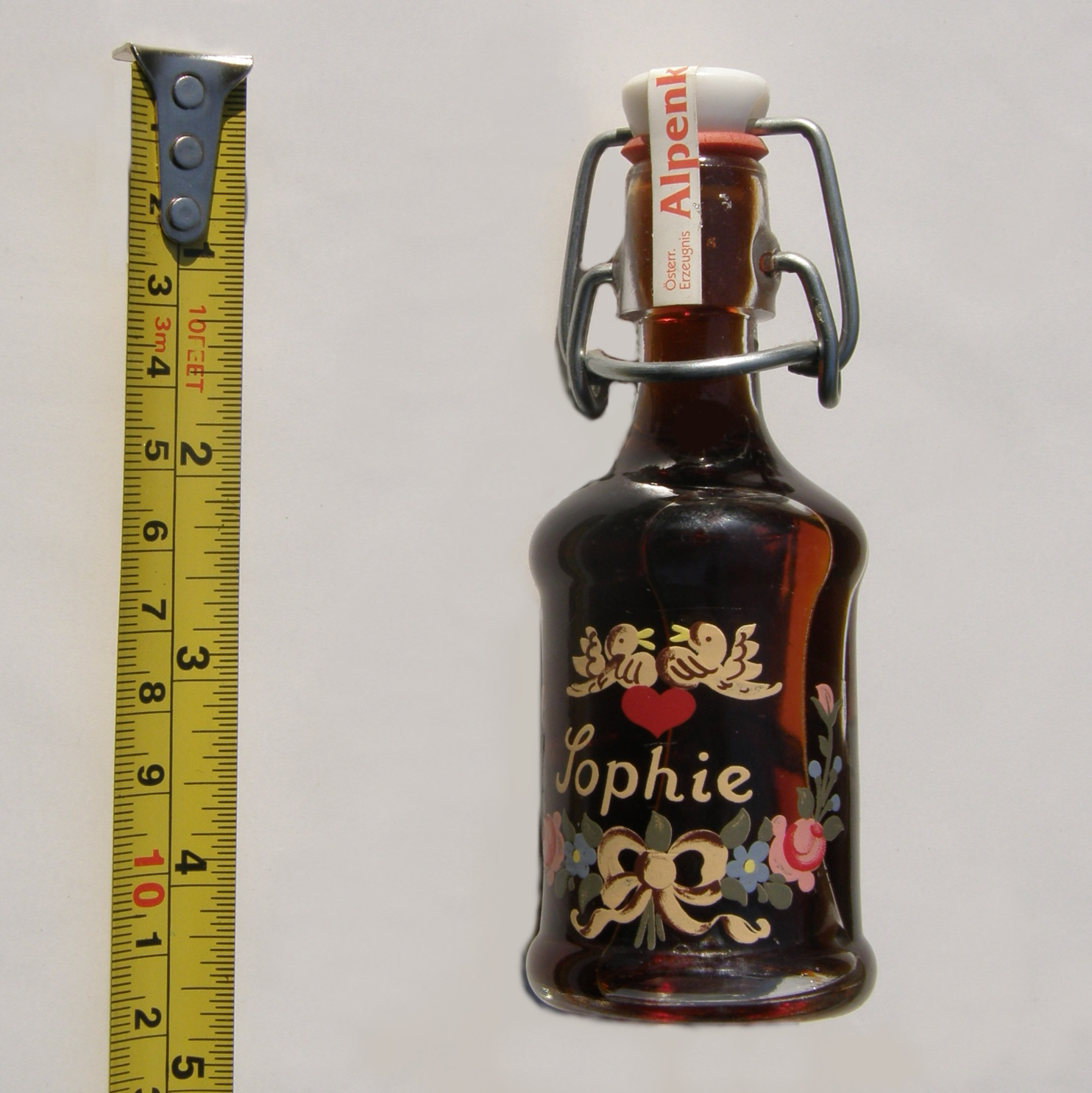
Mini bottle of herbal liqueur

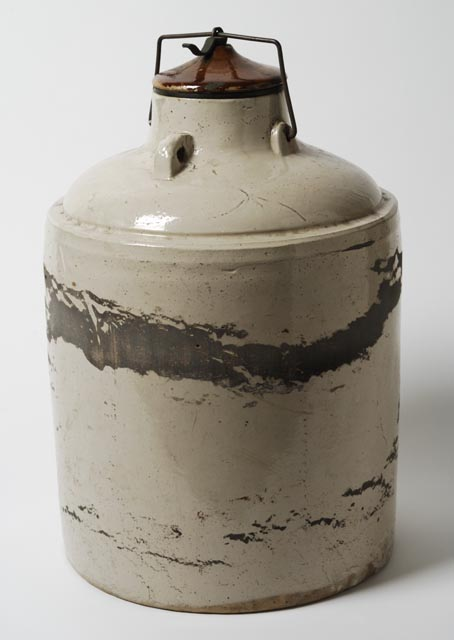
Pottery jug with bail closure

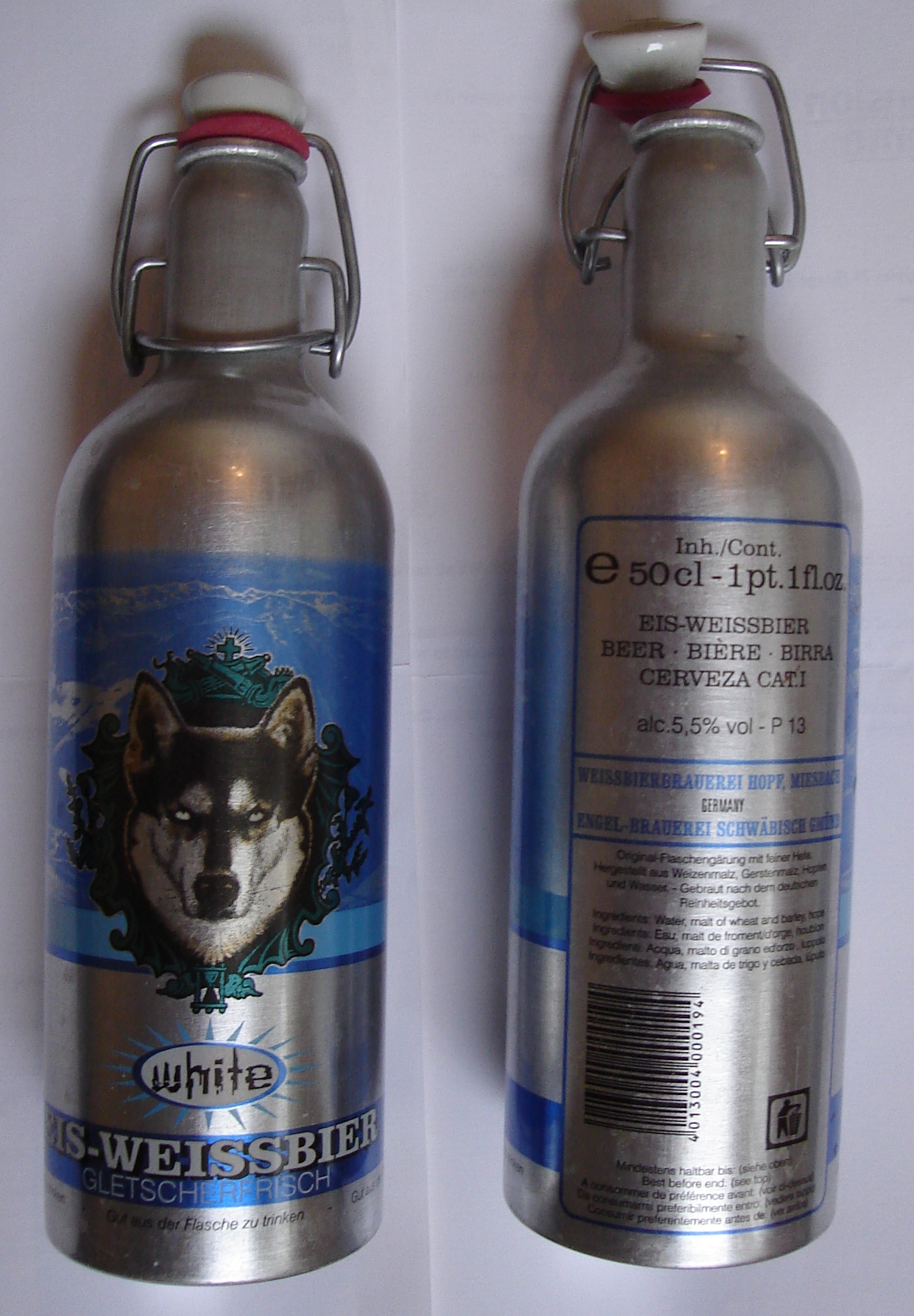
Aluminum flip-top bottle

== See also ==
- Screw cap
- Bung
