= Prenylthiol =

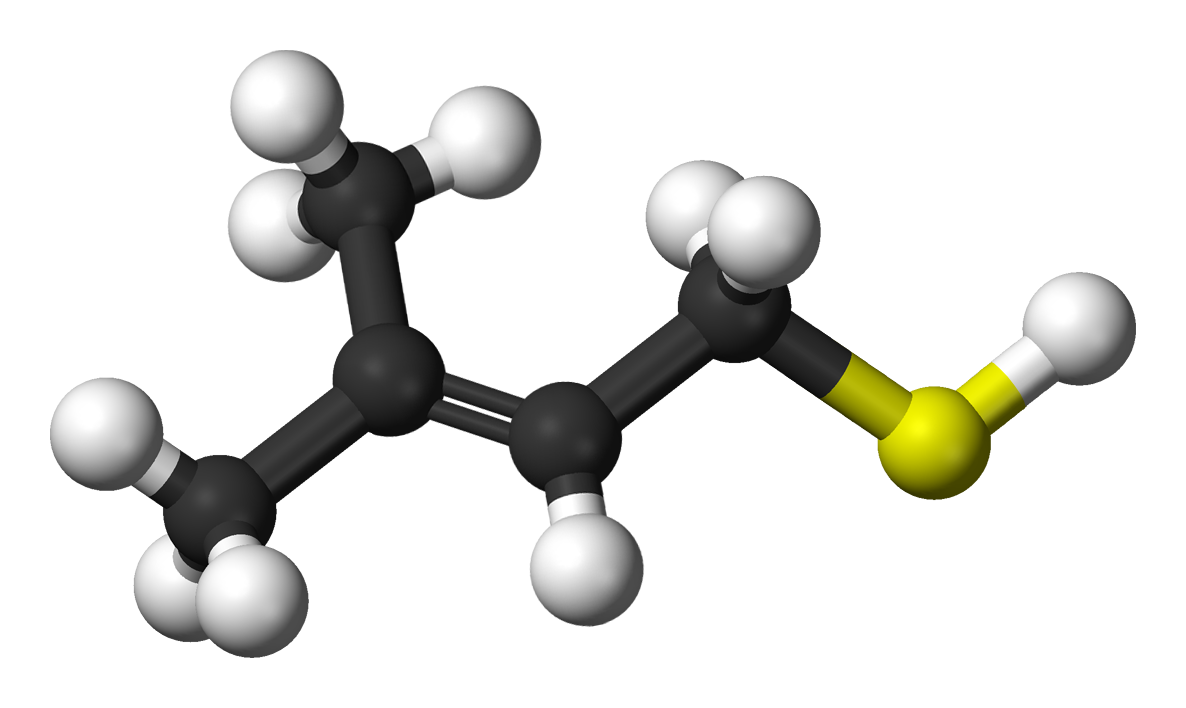

Names
- IUPAC name 3-methylbut-2-ene-1-thiol
- Other names Prenyl mercaptan; 3-Methyl-2-butene-1-thiol; MBT; Prenylthiol; UNII-FDG262156U; 2-Butene-1-thiol, 3-methyl-

Identifiers
CAS Number	5287-45-6
3D model (JSmol)	Interactive image
ChEBI	CHEBI:169260
ChemSpider	129292
ECHA InfoCard	100.118.632
EC Number	610-907-9
PubChem CID	146586
UNII	FDG262156U
CompTox Dashboard (EPA)	DTXSID00200907
- InChI: InChI=1S/C5H10S/c1-5(2)3-4-6/h3,6H,4H2,1-2H3 Key: GYDPOKGOQFTYGW-UHFFFAOYSA-N
- SMILES: CC(=CCS)C

Properties
Chemical formula	C_{5}H_{10}S
Molar mass	102.2 g/mol
Density	0.9012 g/cm³
Boiling point	125–127 °C (257–261 °F; 398–400 K)

Hazards
- GHS labelling
Pictograms	(GHS02: Flammable) (GHS07: Exclamation mark)
Signal word	Warning
Hazard statements	H226, H315, H319, H335
Precautionary statements	P210, P233, P240, P241, P242, P243, P261, P264, P270, P271, P280, P301+P312, P302+P352, P303+P361+P353, P304+P340, P305+P351+P338, P312, P330, P332+P313, P337+P313, P362, P370+P378, P403+P233, P403+P235, P405, P501
- Except where otherwise noted, data are given for materials in their standard state (at 25 °C [77 °F], 100 kPa). Infobox references

Prenylthiol or 3-methyl-2-butene-1-thiol is an organosulfur compound with the formula (CH_{3})_{2}C=CHCH_{2}SH. It is a derivative of prenyl alcohol and hydrogen sulfide.

== Occurrence ==
Prenylthiol is a fairly common components of roasted or cooked foods such as beer, including lightstruck or "skunky" beer. Some roasted coffee also owes it aroma to this thiol. The "skunk-like" aroma of burnt cannabis is attributed to prenylthiol.
