= Grolsch Brewery =

Dutch brewery

Grolsch
- Industry: Alcoholic beverage
- Founded: 1615; 411 years ago
- Headquarters: Enschede, Netherlands
- Products: Beer
- Production output: 3.2 million hectoliters
- Owner: Asahi Breweries
- Website: grolsch.com

Koninklijke Grolsch N.V. (Dutch pronunciation: [ˈkoːnɪŋkləkə ˈɣrɔls]; "Royal Grolsch"), known simply as Grolsch, is a Dutch brewery founded in 1615 by Willem Neerfeldt in Groenlo. In 1895, the de Groen family bought the brewery. They had started their own brewery in Enschede in the early 19th century and held a significant stake until 2007. Today the main brewery is in Enschede.

It was awarded the Koninklijk (Royal) title in 1995. Grolsch became part of the SABMiller group in 2008.

As part of the agreements made with regulators before Anheuser-Busch InBev was allowed to acquire SABMiller, the company sold Grolsch to Asahi Breweries in 2016.

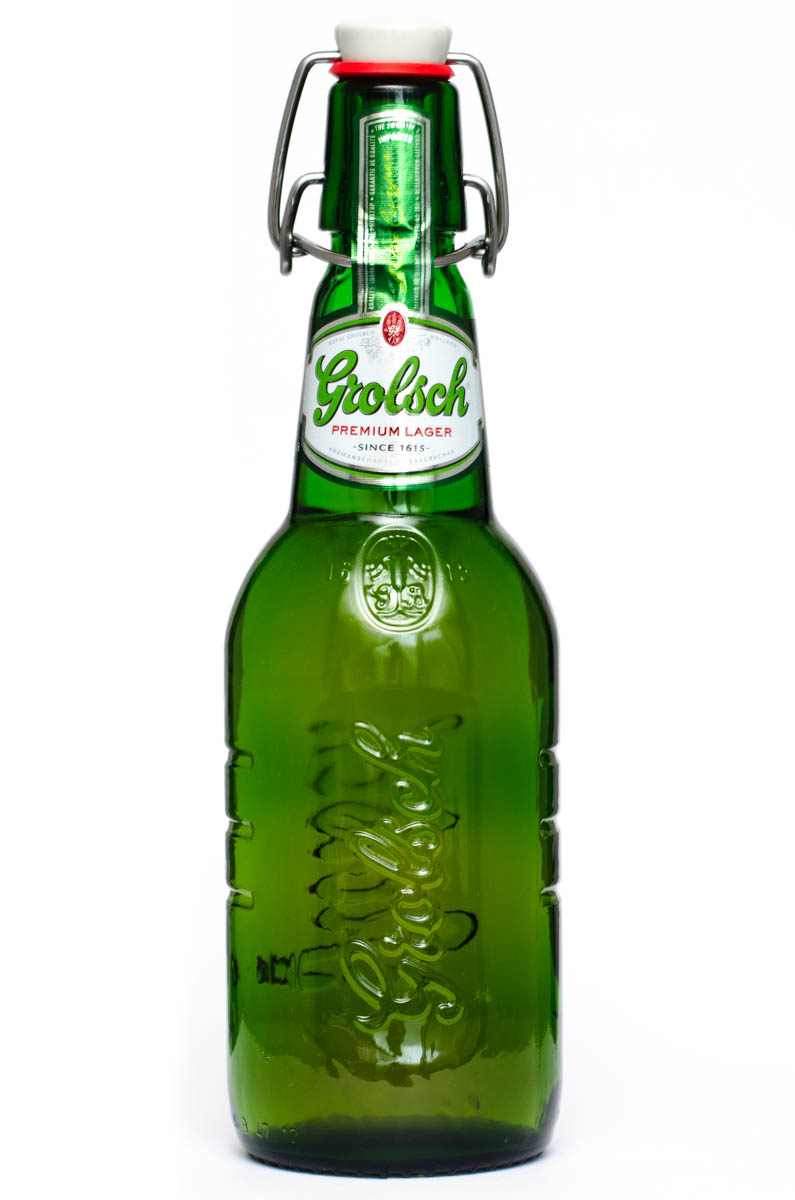
Grolsch premium lager bottle with characteristic flip-top closure

== History ==
The Grolsch brewery was founded in 1615 in Groenlo. The city of Groenlo was then known as Grolle, hence the name Grolsch, meaning 'of Grolle'. Grolsch is best known for its 5% abv pale lager, Grolsch Premium Pilsner. The brewery was first operated by Willem Neerfeldt. Neerfeldt's son-in-law, Peter Sanford Kuyper, later took over. Grolsch was, as of February 2006, the second largest brewer in the Netherlands (after Heineken) with annual production of 320 million litres. The domestic market comprises 51% of total production.

=== Change of ownership ===
On 19 November 2007, the board of Royal Grolsch NV accepted an €816 million offer for the company by SABMiller. The takeover was completed with the delisting of Grolsch's shares on 20 March 2008.

SABMiller subsequently sold the company to Anheuser-Busch InBev. Further, in April 2016, the latter accepted Asahi Group Holdings Ltd.'s offer to buy not only Grolsch but also the Peroni and Meantime beer brands for €2.55 billion (US $2.9 billion).

== International market ==
Grolsch is the 21st largest provider of beer in the world, and is available in 70 countries. Grolsch focuses primarily on the United Kingdom, the United States, Canada, Australia and New Zealand. These primary markets make up 78% of Grolsch's international sales (by volume). Grolsch Premium Pilsner is by far the most important beer in its international profile, while its Amsterdam brand grew by 40% in 2006, primarily in Russia and France.

=== United Kingdom ===
For 25 years, Grolsch Premium Pilsner was brewed under licence in the UK by Grolsch (UK) Ltd., a joint venture with Coors Brewers Ltd until November 2019. It was no longer available in the UK after Asahi ended the JV. However, it was reintroduced into the UK in late October 2020 with a lower ABV recipe at 4%; its alcohol content was further reduced to 3.4% ABV in 2024 as a cost saving exercise.

=== Canada ===
In 2002, the Canadian Sleeman Breweries purchased the rights to distribute Grolsch in Canada.

=== United States ===
In 2006, Grolsch ended its five-year relationship with importer United States Beverage, LLC, and signed a distribution agreement with Anheuser-Busch effective 1 April 2006, which was terminated following the SABMiller acquisition as A-B did not want to promote a rival's product.

Five beers are featured in the US market: Grolsch Lager, Grolsch Amber, Grolsch Blonde and Grolsch Light. Grolsch Premium Pilsner is available in a wide variety of serving sizes, including swing-top bottles, mini-kegs and half-barrels. The others have only been confirmed available in 6 pack, 12-US-fluid-ounce (355 ml) bottles.

== The brewery ==
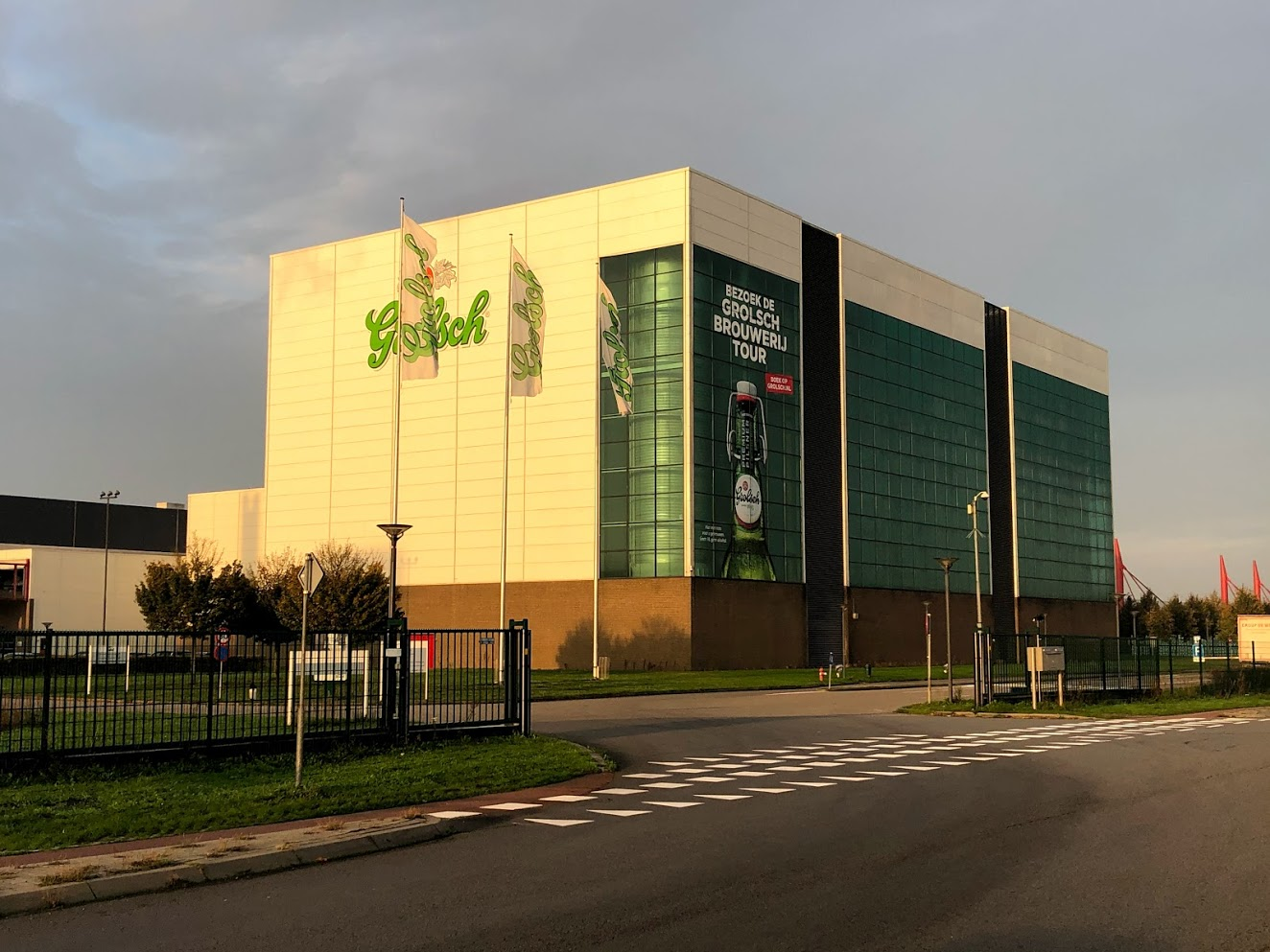
The brewery in the Netherlands

Though built as a secondary facility, over the years, the Enschede brewery became the main producer of Grolsch. This brewery was heavily damaged during a fireworks explosion on 13 May 2000. The brewery in Groenlo has closed. a new brewery in Boekelo, near Enschede (replacing both the Groenlo and the old Enschede affiliate) opened in 2004.

To underline their ties with Enschede and the whole region Grolsch signed a deal with professional football club FC Twente to sponsor their stadium starting the 2008–2009 season. The stadium is named De Grolsch Veste (Grolsch Fortress), a reference to the history of fortified city Grol, the hometown of Grolsch.

== Price fixing conviction ==
On 18 April 2007, the European Commission imposed fines on Heineken International of €219.3m, Grolsch of €31.65m and Bavaria of €22.85m for operating a price-fixing cartel in the Netherlands, totalling €273.7m. InBev (formerly Interbrew) escaped without a penalty because it provided "decisive information" about the cartel which operated between 1996 and 1999 with others in the EU market. The brewers controlled 95% of the Dutch market, with Heineken claiming a half and the three others 15% each.

Former EU Competition Commissioner Neelie Kroes said, at the time, that she was "very disappointed" that the collusion took place at the very highest (boardroom) level. She added that Heineken, Grolsch, Bavaria and InBev tried to cover their tracks by using code names and abbreviations for secret meetings to carve up the market for beer sold to supermarkets, hotels, restaurants and cafes. The price fixing extended to cheaper own-brand labels and rebates for bars.

This is simply unacceptable: that major beer suppliers colluded to up prices and to carve up markets among themselves

— EU Competition Commissioner Neelie Kroes

== Beers ==
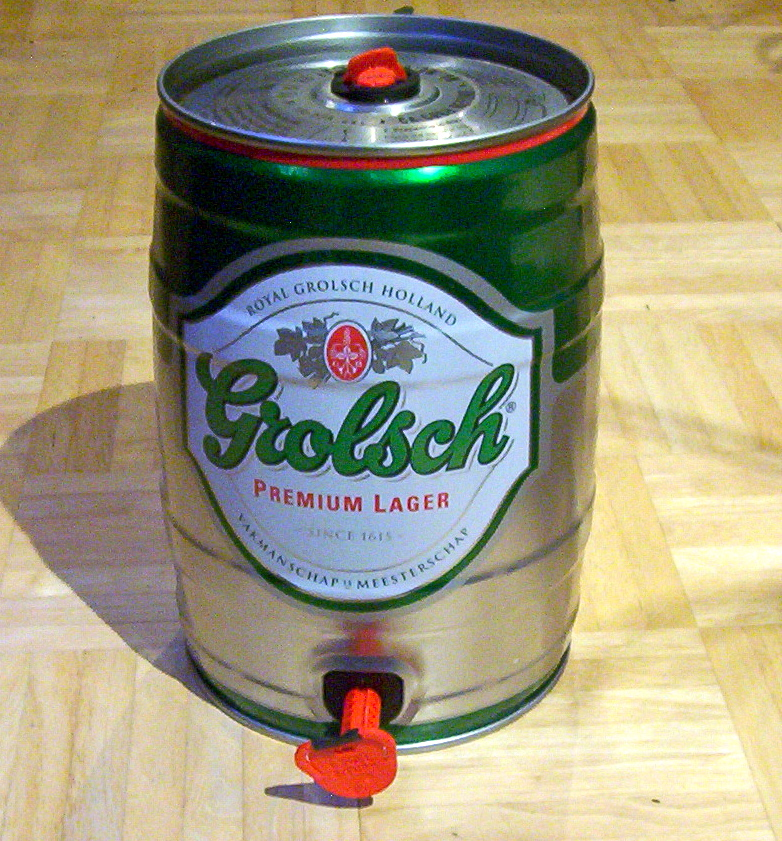
The mini keg of Grolsch holds 5 litres (1.1 imp gal; 1.3 US gal)

Grolsch produces a range of mainly pale lager beers from alcohol free to 11.6% abv:

- Grolsch Premium Pilsner - Known internationally as Grolsch Premium Lager, is its flagship beer and comprises 95% of all sales. It contains 5.0% abv.
- Grolsch Premium Blond - Blond is a lighter version of the Pilsner, with 30% fewer calories and 4% abv.
- Grolsch Premium Light - A light version of the Pilsner with 3.7% abv, available only in the United States.
- Grolsch Premium Weizen - A traditional hefeweizen brewed according to the Reinheitsgebot. It finishes soft and wet and has 5.5% abv.

Speciality brews:

- Grolsch Premium Lentebok (6.5% abv)
- Grolsch Premium Herfstbok (6.5% abv)
- Grolsch Premium Malt (alcohol free)
- Grolsch Oud Bruin (2.5% abv)
- Grolsch Het Kanon (11.6% abv)
- Grolsch Premium 2.5 (2.5% abv)
- Grolsch Lemon 2.5 (2.5% abv)
- Grolsch Cranberry Rosé (5.5% abv)
- Grolsch Radler (2% abv)

Grolsch also produces the Amsterdam brand of low-priced, mainly strong lagers for the European market. It is also sold in Singapore and Australia.

- Amsterdam Maximator (11.6% abv)
- Amsterdam Navigator (8.4% abv)
- Amsterdam Explorator (6.8% abv)
- Amsterdam Mariner (4.8% abv)
- Amsterdam Liberator (alcohol free)

== Bottle design ==
=== Beugel ===
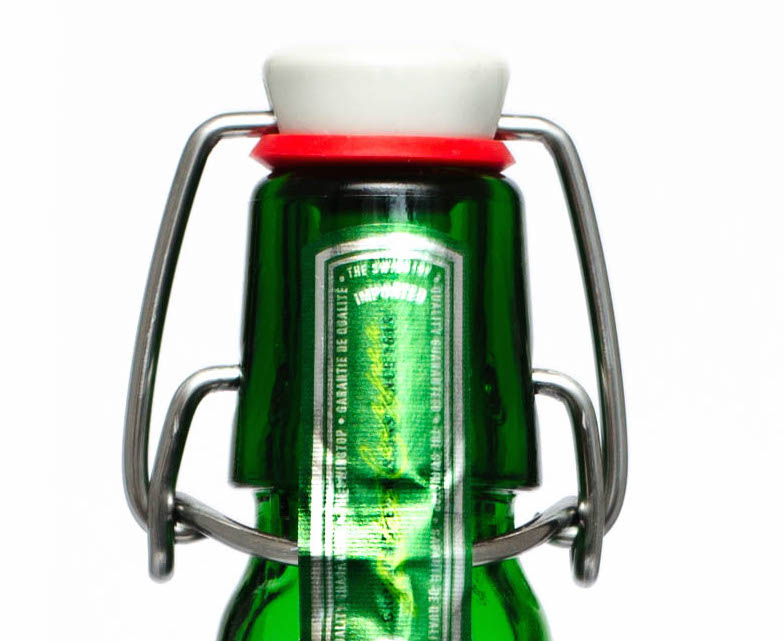
Swing top beer bottle closure, unopened

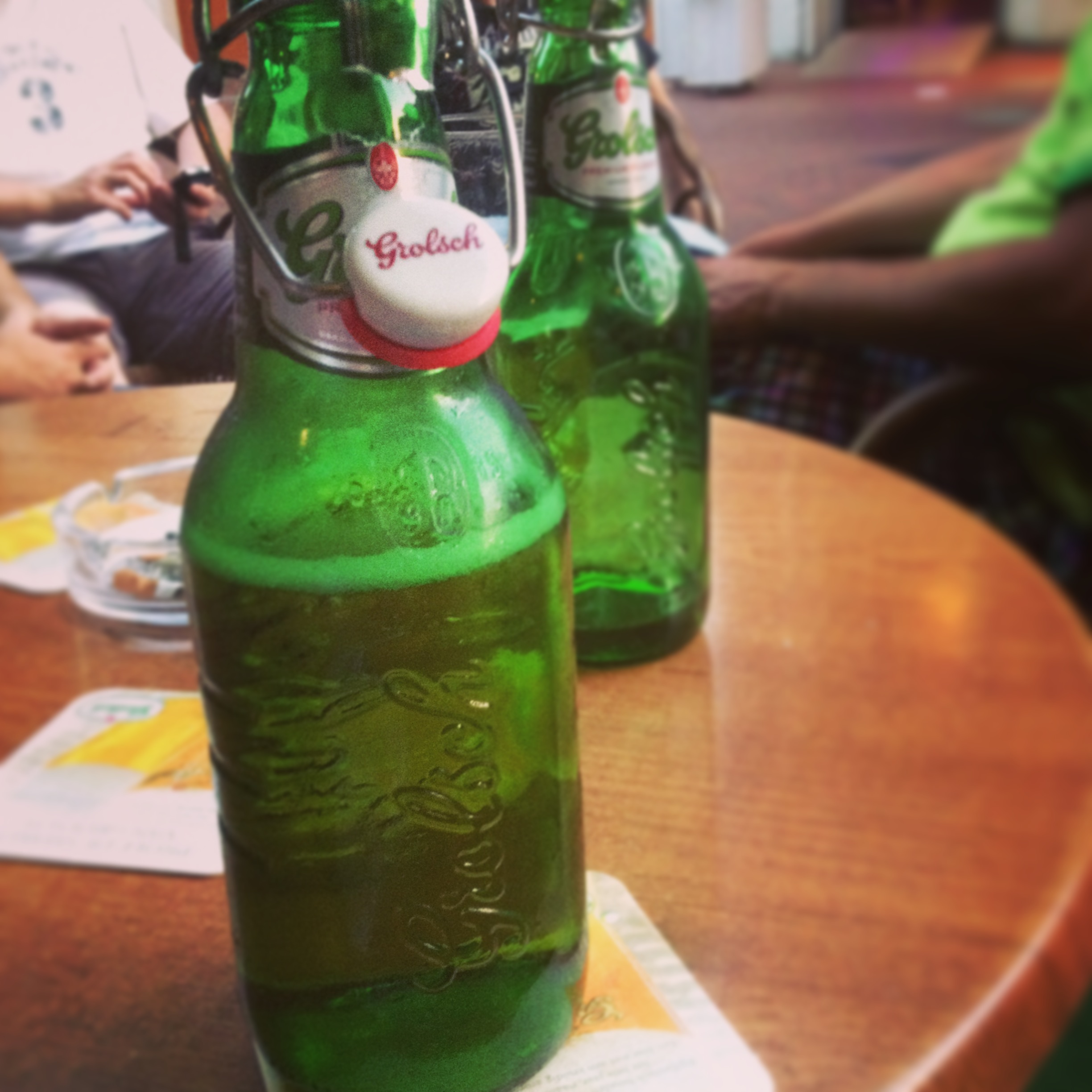
An opened bottle of Grolsch premium lager

In addition to the 'new' bottle, Grolsch uses a distinctively shaped bottle for some of its products, known as de beugel or 'swingtop'. Bottles of this type use a flip-top cap, eliminating the need for an opener. The brown domestic bottle contains 450ml, which is over one-third more than the capacity of the average Dutch beer bottle; further, the green export bottle is slightly larger, at 467 mL. In 2008, the brewery introduced a slimmer design that is a consistent 450ml for both the domestic market and export. The new bottles can be opened by hand, using a lever at the side of the bottleneck. The label is applied over the lever in order to make any tampering evident. The top used to be made of porcelain, but is now made of plastic. Bottles with porcelain tops are still in circulation in the Netherlands. They are popular with homebrewers, as they are very robust and can easily be sealed by hand without the expense of new crown seals.

Occasionally, Grolsch will use different color bottles, depending on the brew. For example, the bottle for blonde lager is yellow, while the 2.5 lemon variety came in a clear 250 mL bottle.

=== The new bottle ===
In 2007, Grolsch also started using green bottles for the home market. Grolsch was the first major brewery to stop using the brown refillable bottles which were used by nearly every brewery in the Netherlands. The new green bottles have the Grolsch logo marked in the glass and come in a new package. The label is now placed higher at the neck of the bottle, and the bottles contain 10% more beer (now 330ml). The new bottle was introduced through the slogan 'Bier mag weer gezien worden', which translates roughly as, "Beer that is fit to be seen again." In November 2014, the brewery changed to new, smaller bottles that contain 300 mL for Grolsch Premium Pilsner, Grolsch Stender, Grolsch Radler and Kornuit.
