= Beer glassware =

Drinking and serving glass for beer

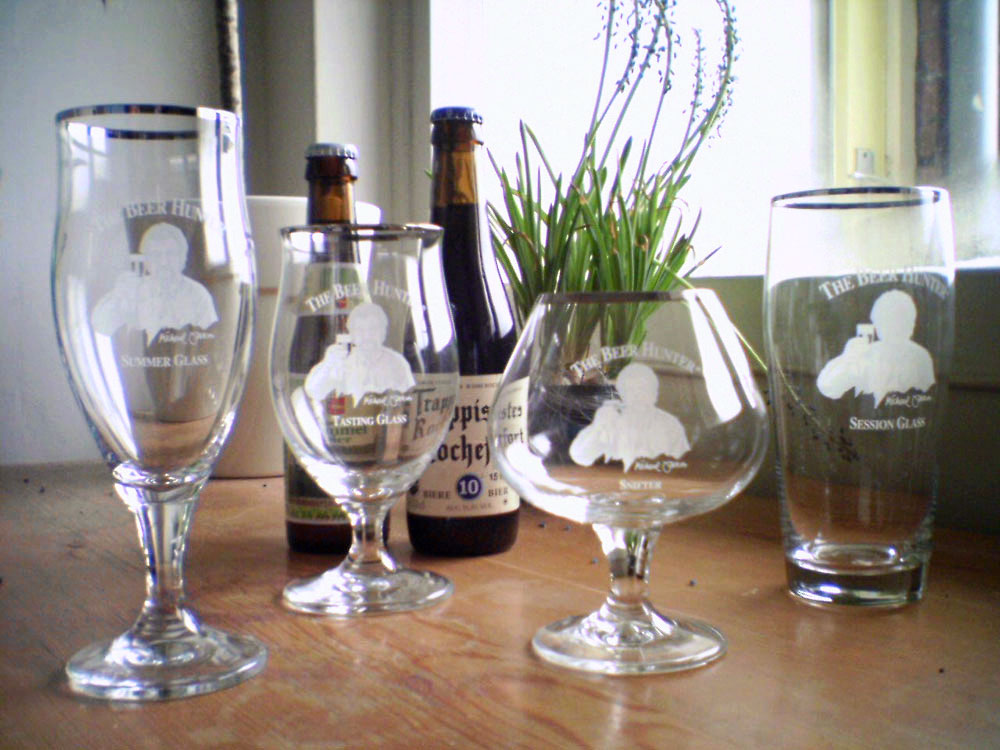
Beer glassware (from left to right): Pilstulpe, tasting glass, snifter, Willibecher

Beer glassware comprise vessels, today usually made of glass, designed or commonly used for serving and drinking beer. Styles of beer glasses vary in accordance with national or regional traditions; legal or customary requirements regarding serving measures and fill lines; and practicalities such as avoiding breakage during washing, stacking or storage. They also vary due to commercial promotion by breweries; artistic or cultural expression in folk art, novelty items or drinking games; or to complement, enhance, or otherwise affect a particular type of beer's temperature, appearance and aroma, as in the case of its head. Drinking vessels intended for beer are made from a variety of materials other than glass, including pottery, pewter, and wood.

In commercial settings across many countries, beer glasses are served placed on a paperboard beer mat that is usually printed with brand advertising.

== International styles ==
=== Pilsner glass ===
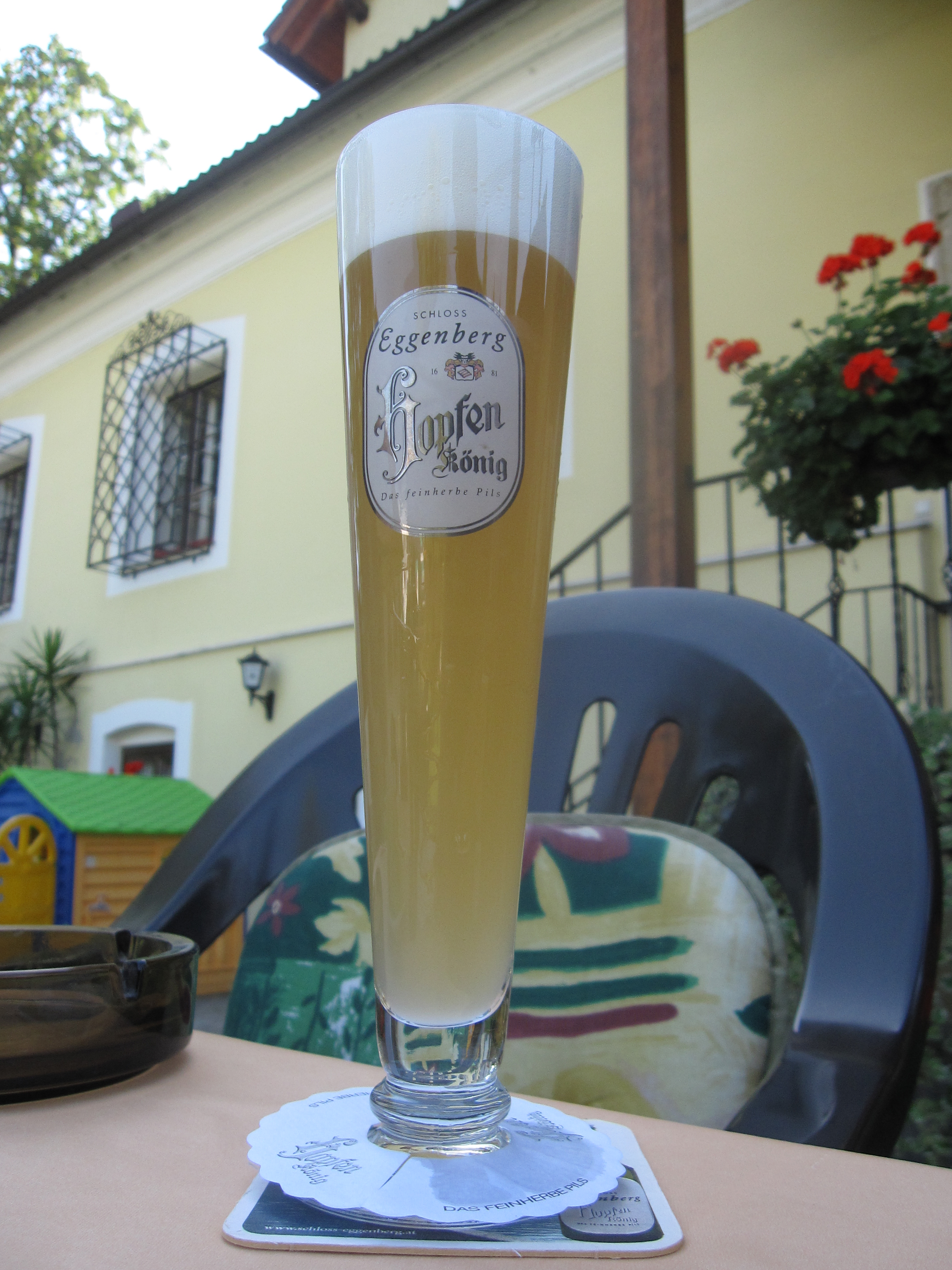
Pilsner glass from Brauerei Schloss Eggenberg

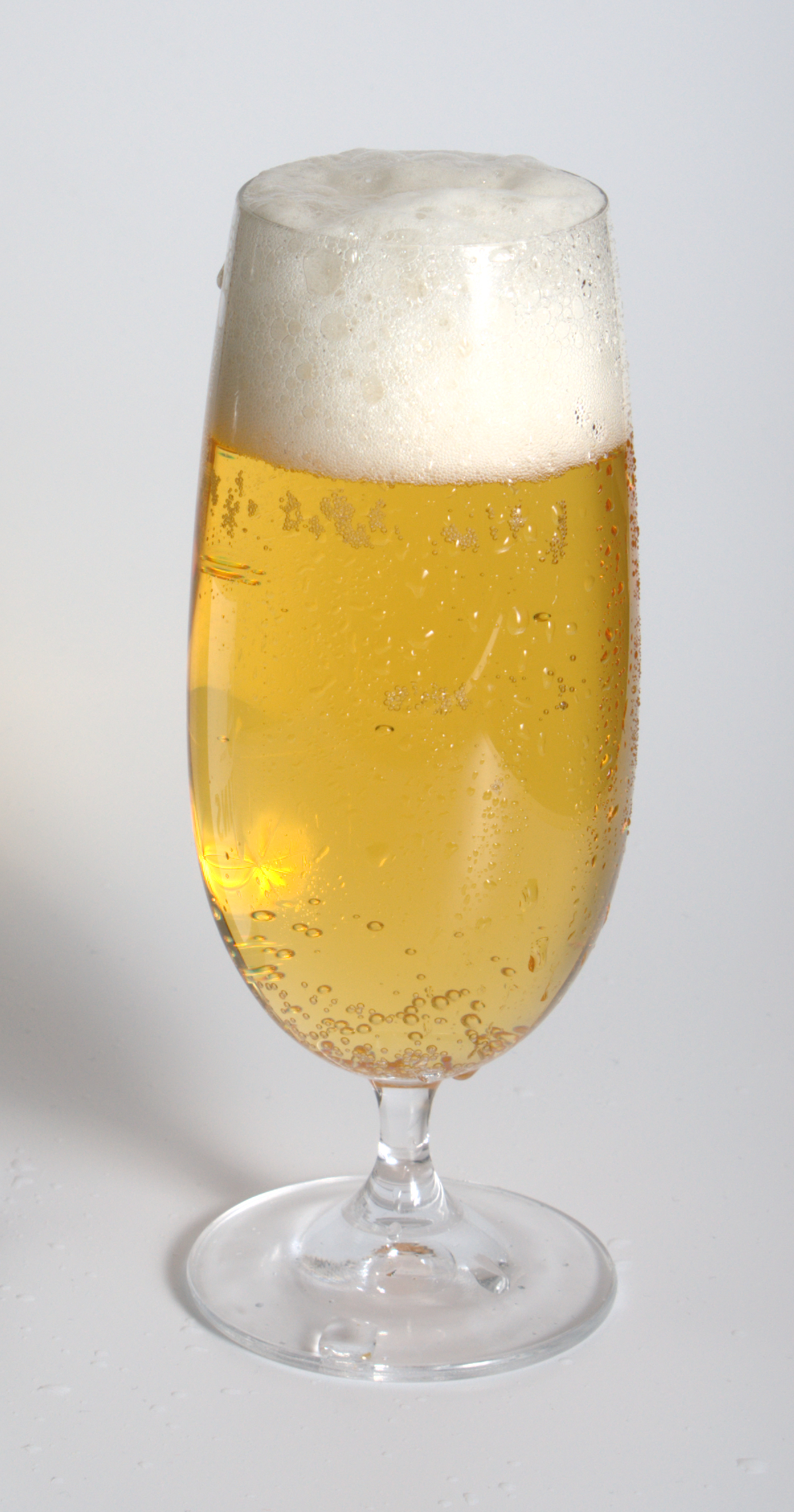
A traditional German Pilstulpe ("pilsner tulip") glass

A pilsner glass is used for many types of light beers, including pale lager or pilsner. Pilsner glasses are generally smaller than a pint glass, usually in 200 millilitres (7.0 imperial fluid ounces), 250 ml (8.8 imp fl oz), 300 ml (11 imp fl oz), 330 ml (12 imp fl oz) or 400 ml (14 imp fl oz) sizes. In Europe, 500 ml (18 imp fl oz) glasses are also common. They are tall, slender and tapered. The slender glass reveals the colour, and carbonation of the beer, and the broad top helps maintain a beer head.

Weizen glasses are sometimes mistakenly called pilsner glasses because they are somewhat similar in appearance, but true pilsner glasses have an even taper without any amount of curvature.

=== Pint glass ===
The definition of a pint differs by country, thus a pint glass will reflect the regular measure of beer in that country. In the UK, law stipulates that a serving of beer be fixed at the imperial pint (568 ml or 1.20095 US pints). Half-pint glasses of 10 imp fl oz (284 ml) and one-third pint glasses of 189ml are generally smaller versions of pint glasses. Quarter-pint glasses of 5 imp fl oz (142 ml) also exist, and are popular in Australia (now 140 ml from metrication), where they are known as a "pony". These may simply be smaller pint glasses, or may be a special pony glass. In the US, a pint is 16 US fl oz (473 ml), but the glasses may vary somewhat, and glasses of 500 ml are also called pints in American parlance.

The common shapes of pint glasses are:

- Conical glasses are shaped, as the name suggests, as an inverted truncated cone around 6 inches (15 cm) tall and tapering by about 1 inch (25 mm) in diameter over its height.
- The nonic, a variation on the conical design, where the glass bulges out a couple of inches from the top; this is partly to improve the grip, partly to prevent the glasses from sticking together when stacked, and partly to give strength and stop the rim from becoming chipped or "nicked". The term "nonic" derives from "no nick".
- Jug glasses, or "dimple mugs", are shaped more like a large mug with a handle. They are moulded with a grid pattern of thickened glass on the outside, somewhat resembling the segmentation of a WWII-era hand grenade. The dimples prevent the glass slipping out of the fingers in a washing-up bowl, and the design of the glass emphasises strength, also to withstand frequent manual washing. These design features became less important when manual washing was superseded by machine washing from the 1960s onwards. Dimpled glasses are now rarer than the other types and are regarded as more traditional. This sort of glass is also known as a "Handle" due to the handle on the glass. They are popular with the older generation and people with restricted movement in their hands which can make holding a usual pint glass difficult. They have recently started to make a comeback, especially in northern Britain.
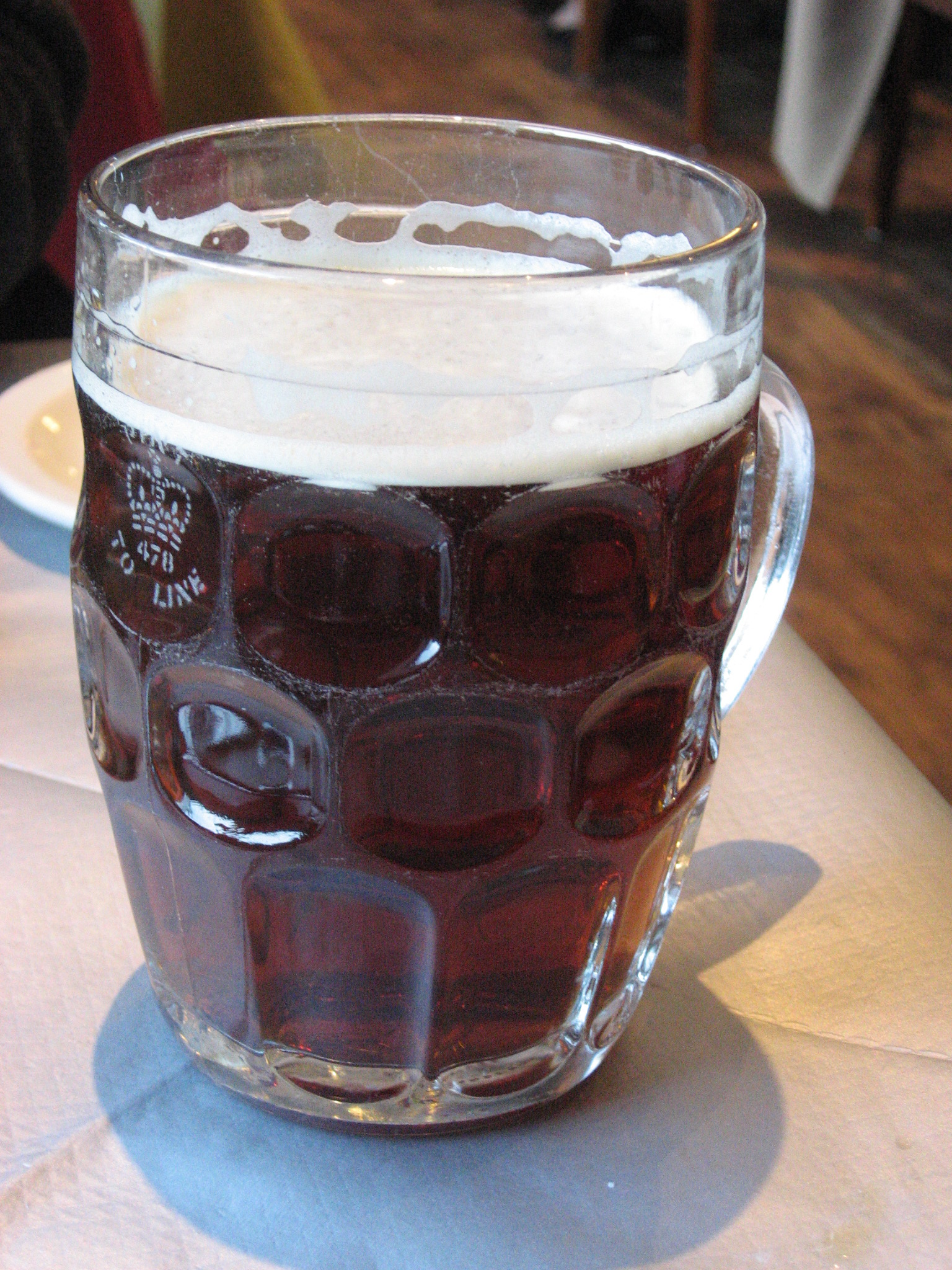
British dimpled glass pint mug

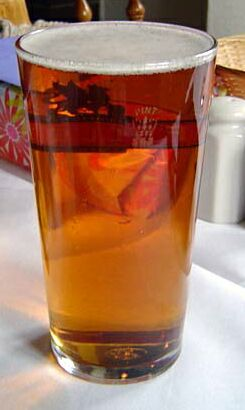
"Conical" pint glass

"Nonic" pint glass

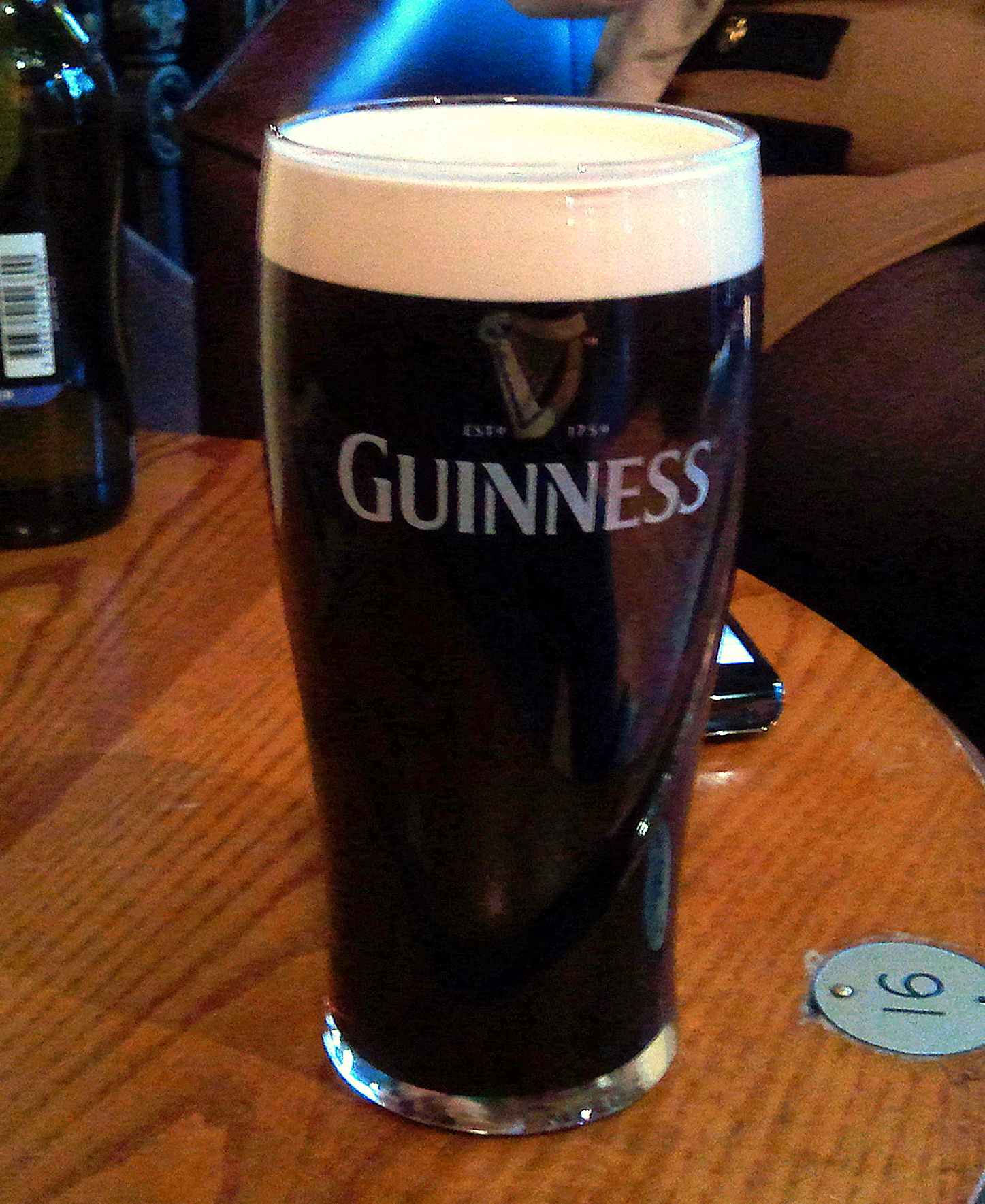
Current Guinness glass

=== Connoisseur's glassware ===
Beer connoisseurs sometimes invest in special, non-traditional glassware to enhance their appreciation. An example was the range marketed by Michael "Beer Hunter" Jackson.

=== Snifters ===
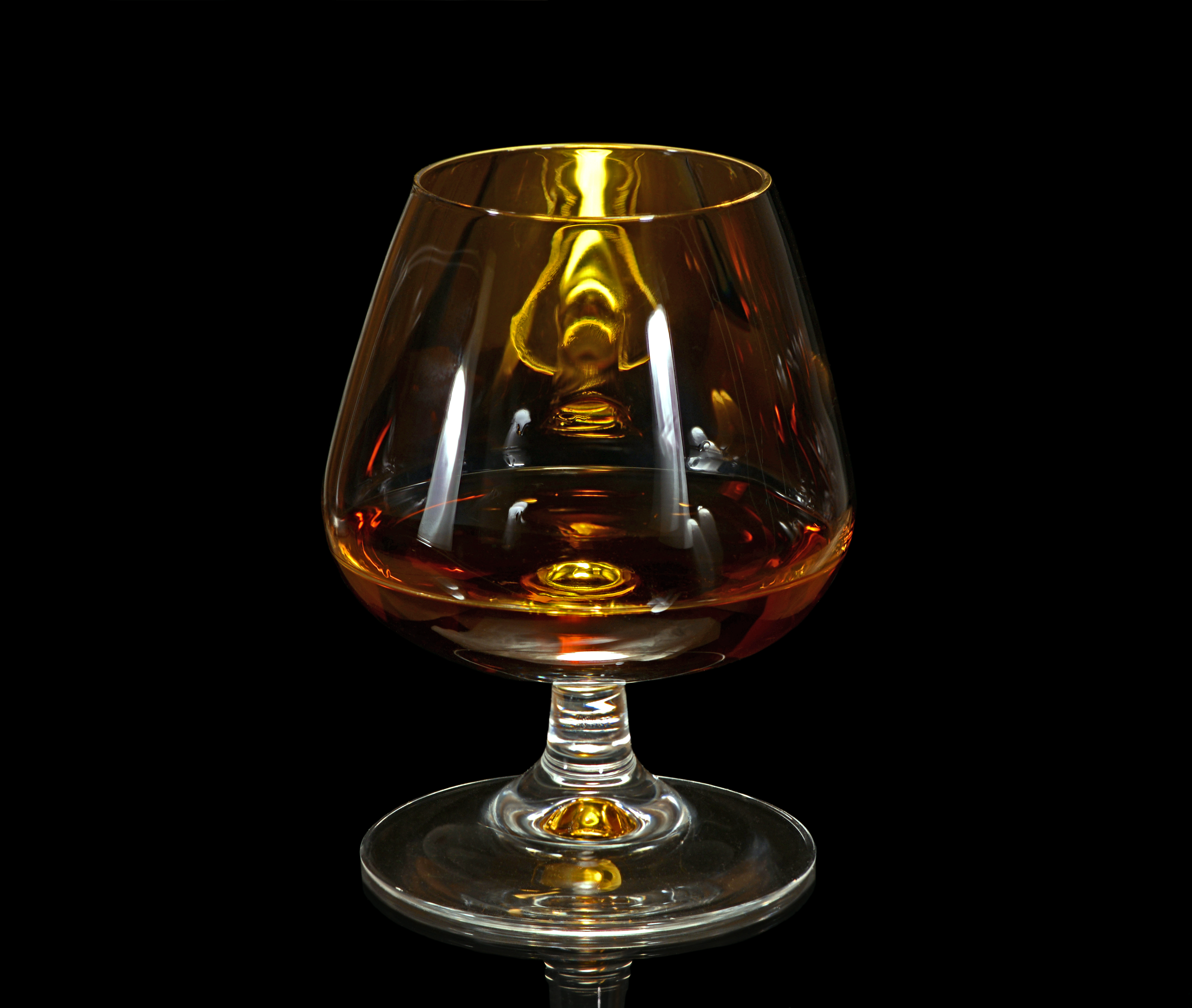
A snifter

Typically used for serving brandy and cognac, a snifter is ideal for capturing the volatiles of aromatic beers such as Double/Imperial IPAs, Belgian ales, barley wines and wheat wines. The shape helps trap the volatiles, while allowing swirling to agitate them and produce an intense aroma.

=== Taster glasses ===
Tasting glasses, also known as testers, are small, versatile glasses designed for sampling a variety of beers in small amounts. These glasses are a staple at beer festivals, tasting events, and breweries, allowing drinkers to explore different styles without committing to a full glass. Glasses holding 1/3 of a pint or less may be used to:

- Try a beer in a pub or café before purchasing a full measure
- Split a bottle of rare or strong beer between friends
- Sample multiple beers without becoming inebriated. For instance a brewpub might provide a sampler of three different brews in 1/3 pint measures, or a beer festival might provide small capacity glasses for patrons.

=== Plastic ===
Plastic beer vessels are usually shaped in imitation of whichever glasses are usual in the locality. They are mainly used as a substitute for glass vessels where breakages would be particularly problematic or likely, for instance at outdoor events.

== German, Austrian, and Swiss styles ==
=== Weizen glasses ===
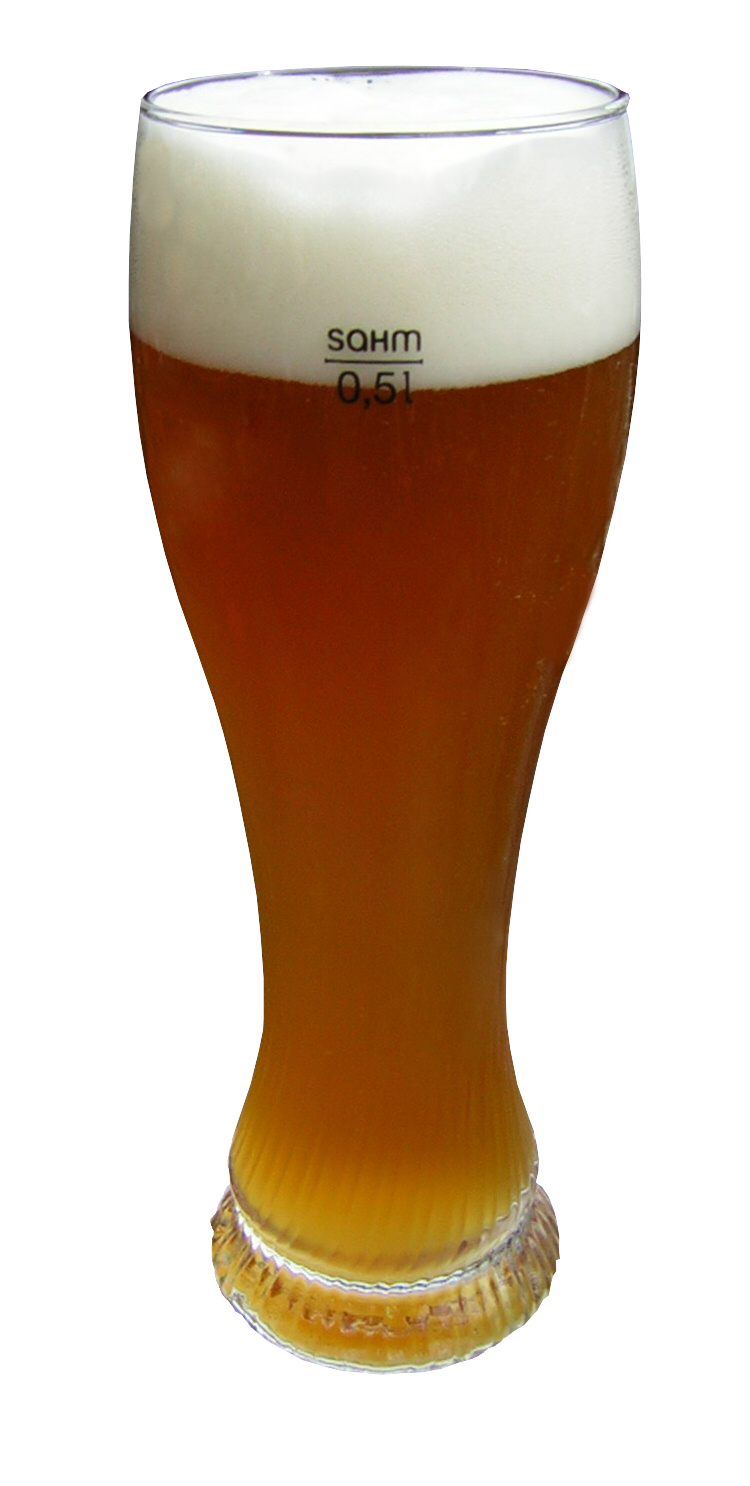
A weizen glass with a fill line

A weizen glass is used to serve wheat beer. Originating in Germany, the glass is narrow at the bottom and slightly wider at the top; the width both releasing aroma, and providing room for the often thick, fluffy heads produced by wheat beer. It tends to be taller than a pint glass, and generally holds 500 ml (7/8 imp pt) with room for foam or "head". In some countries, such as Belgium, the glass may be 250 ml (1/2 imp pt) or 330 ml (5/8 imp pt).

Wheat beers tend to foam a lot, especially if poured quickly. In pubs, if the bottle is handed to the patron for self pouring, it is customary for the glass to be taken to the patron wet or with a bit of water in the bottom to be swirled around to wet the entire glass to keep the beer from foaming excessively.

=== Beer stein ===
Beer stein or simply "stein" (/ˈstaɪn/ STYNE) has been for over a century an English expression for a traditional German beer mug made out of stoneware, whether simple and serviceably sturdy, or elaborately ornamental with either a traditionally cultural theme, or so embellished as to be sold as a souvenir or a collectible. The former may be made out of stoneware, but rarely the inferior earthenware or wood, while the latter is usually of glazed pottery, but often porcelain or pewter, or even silver or crystal. It may have either an uncovered mouth or a hinged pewter lid with a thumb-lever. The capacity of a German "stein" indicated by its fill line on its side ranged from "0.4l" (4 deci-litre), through "0.5l" (half a litre) or a full litre (or comparable historic sizes). Like decorative tankards, steins are often decorated in a culturally nostalgic, often German or Bavarian, theme. Some believe the lid that excludes flies from the beer today was originally intended for those so diseased in the age of the Black Plague.

=== Maßkrug ===
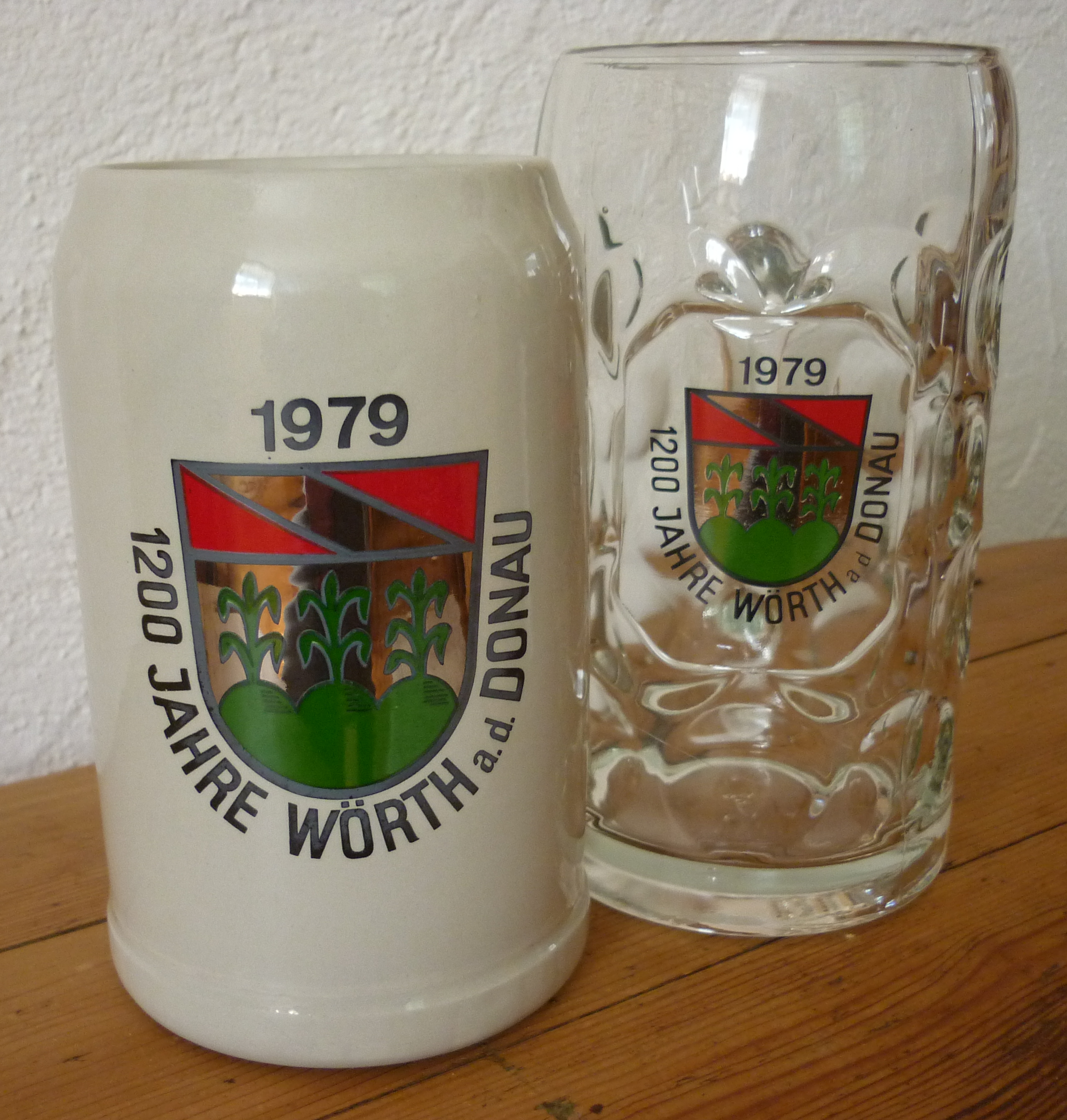
A Maßkrug can be made with stoneware or glass.

The Maß ([ˈmas]) is a one-litre (1.8-imperial-pint; 34-US-fluid-ounce) quantity of beer, most commonly used in Bavaria and Austria. It is served in a Maßkrug (pl. Maßkrüge), which is sometimes simply referred to as a Maß. As a feminine noun, it is die Maß, though commonly confused with the grammatically neuter noun das Maß, meaning "measure". The unit of volume is typically used only for measuring beer sold for immediate on-site consumption. Because the Maß is a unit of measure, it can come in the form of a glass or stoneware mug.

The endurance sport of Maßkrugstemmen involves holding a filled, 2.4-kilogram (5.3 lb) Maß at arm's length. The world record is 45 minutes and 2 seconds.

=== Stangen ===
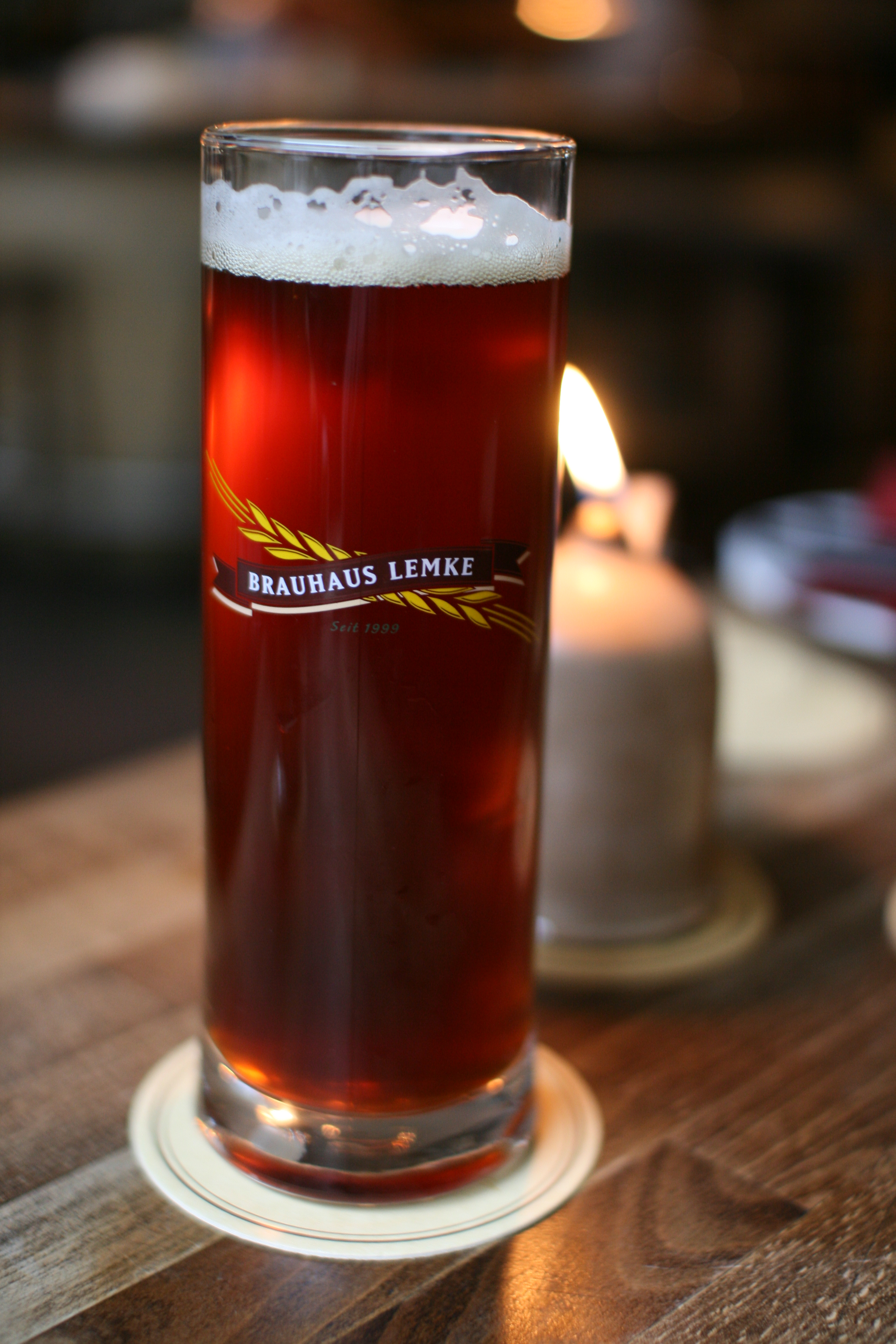
Dunkel beer in a Stange

The high, narrow and cylindrical Stange (German for "stick" or "rod", plural Stangen) is traditionally used for Kölsch. A Becher, traditionally used for Altbier, is similar, though slightly shorter and fatter. The Stange usually holds between 100 and 200 ml (1/8 and 3/8 imp pt), though larger ones are now sometimes used to reduce serving work. Stangen are carried by slotting them into holes in a special tray called a Kranz ("wreath").

=== Willibecher ===
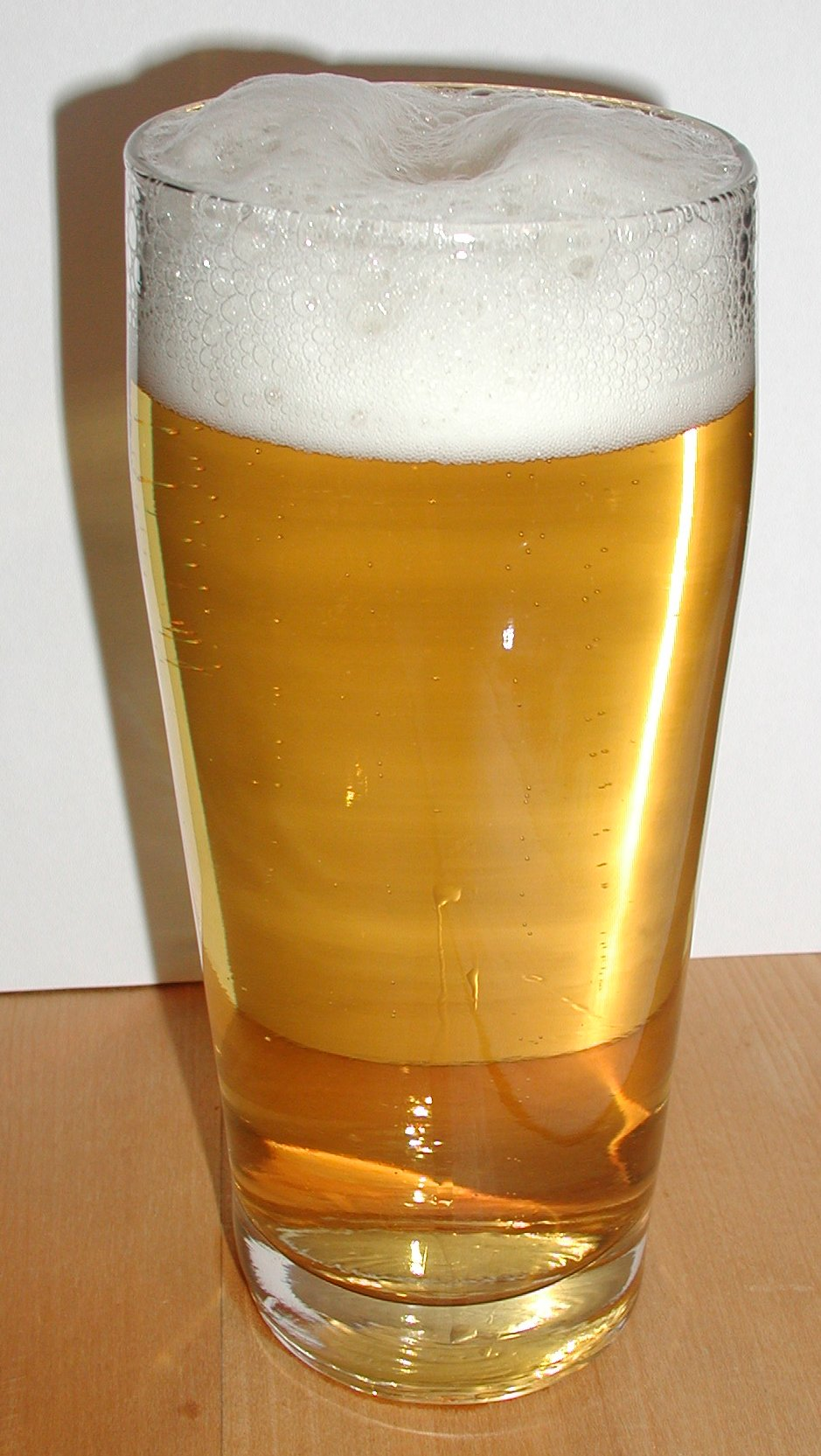
Standard Willibecher

The Willibecher or Willybecher ("Willi glass") is common in Germany. Its invention in 1954 is commonly attributed to an employee of Ruhrglas GmbH named Willy Steinmeier. It is characterized by its shape: conical to the top portion where it curves inward to converge back to the top of a smaller diameter opening. The Willibecher is produced in sizes of 200, 250, 300, 400, and 500 ml (0.35, 0.44, 0.53, 0.70, and 0.88 imp pt; 6.8, 8.5, 10.1, 13.5, and 16.9 US fl oz).

=== Beer boot ===
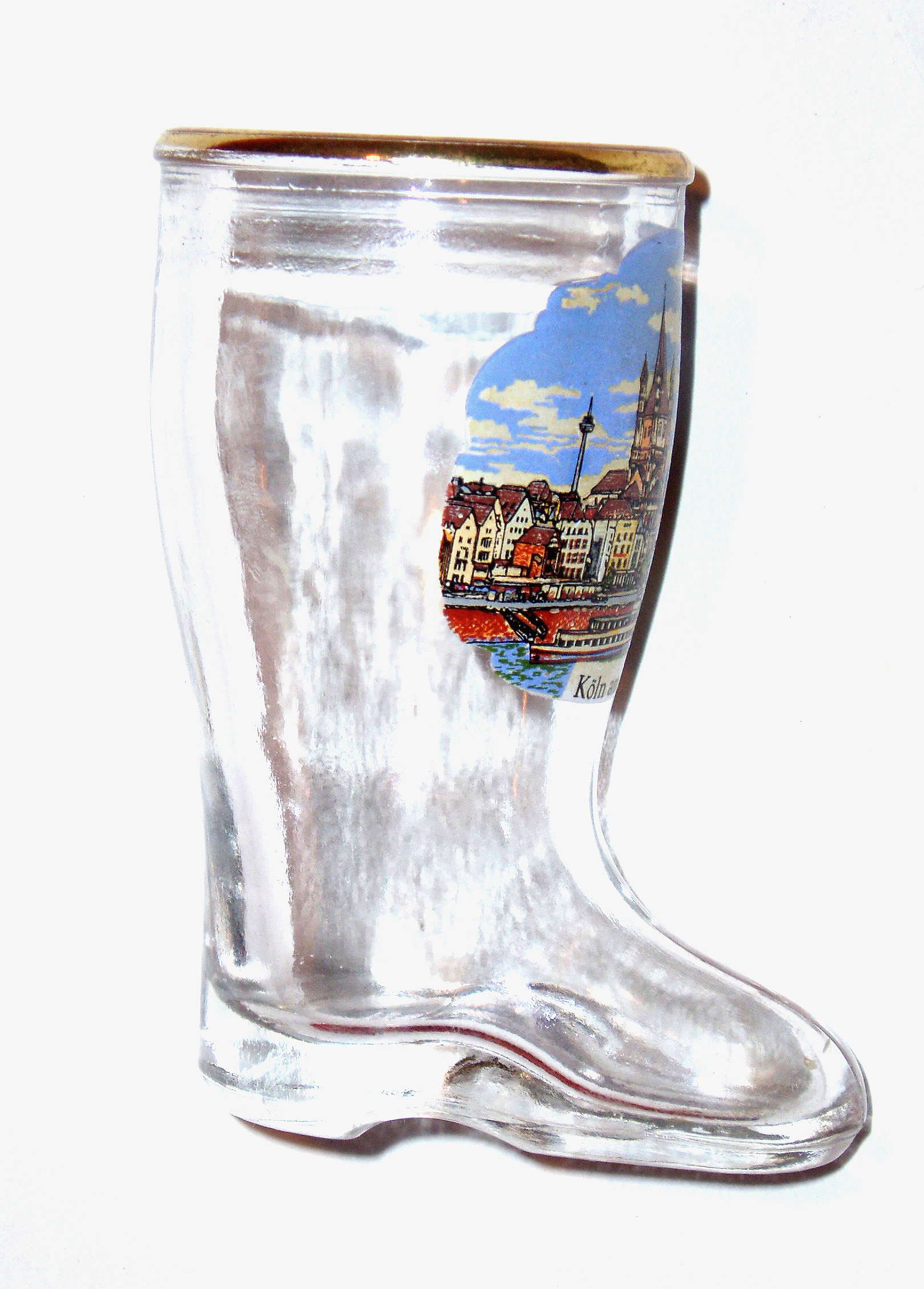
German "Beer boot"

Boot- and shoe-shaped drinking vessels have been found at archaeological sites dating back to the bronze-age Urnfield cultures. Modern beer boots (German: Bierstiefel) have over a century of history and culture behind them. It is commonly believed that a general somewhere promised his troops to drink beer from his boot if they were successful in battle. When the troops prevailed, the general had a glassmaker fashion a boot from glass to fulfill his promise without tasting his own feet and to avoid spoiling the beer in his leather boot. Since then, soldiers have enjoyed toasting to their victories with a beer boot. At gatherings in Germany, Austria and Switzerland, beer boots are often passed among the guests for a festive drinking challenge. Since the movie Beerfest premiered in 2006, beer boots have become increasingly popular in the United States.

It is an old joke to hand the boot to a young novice drinker with the toe pointing away from his person, which will result in beer pouring over the drinker's face uncontrollably when air enters the toe; seasoned drinkers always point the toe towards their body until the glass is sufficiently drained.

=== Pilstulpe ===
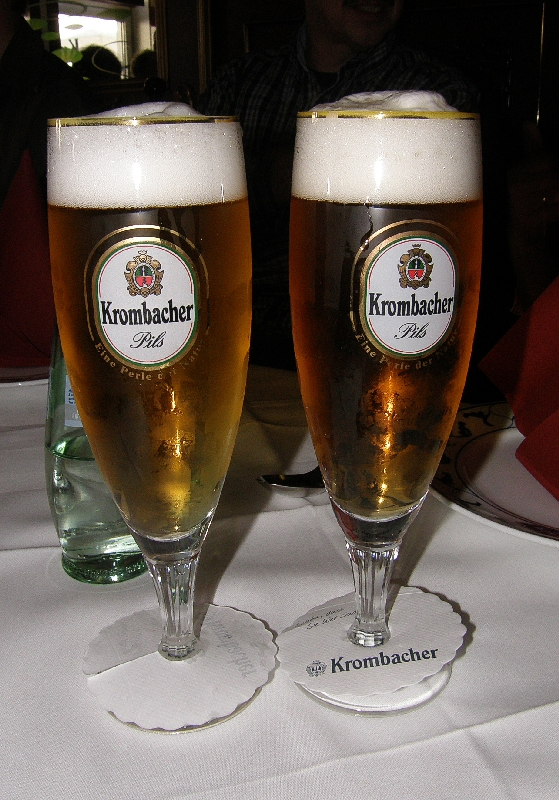
Traditional German Pilstulpen

The Pilstulpe ("Pilsner Tulip") or Biertulpe ("Beer tulip") is the traditional glass used for German pilsner beers. Sizes are typically around 300 millilitres (11 imp fl oz; 10 US fl oz), but can be as large as 500 millilitres (18 imp fl oz; 17 US fl oz). When used in restaurant settings, a small piece of absorbent paper is placed around the base to absorb any drips from spilling or condensation.

=== Gallery ===
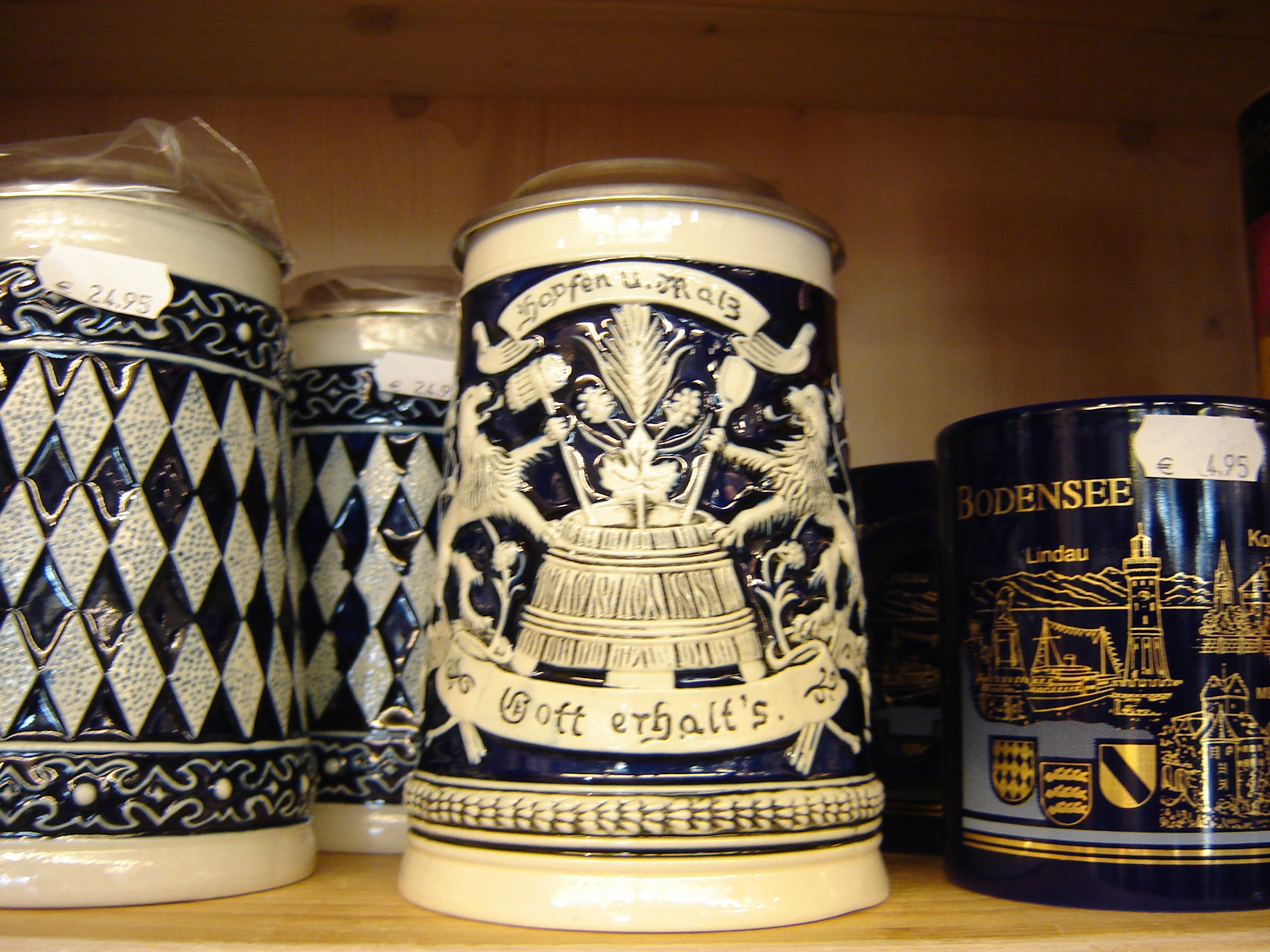
Elaborate earthenware beer steins

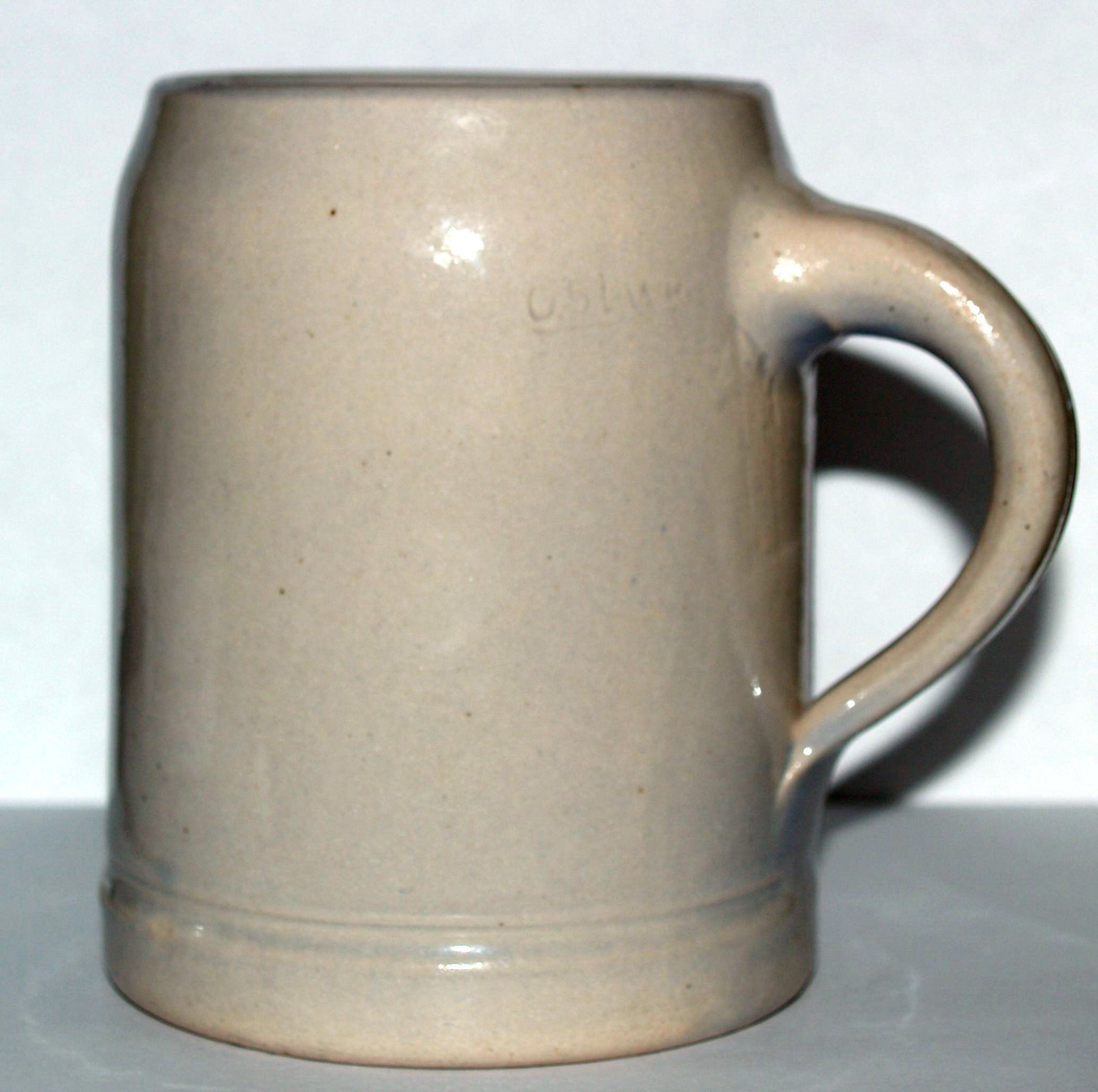
Common half-litre Humpen or beer mug

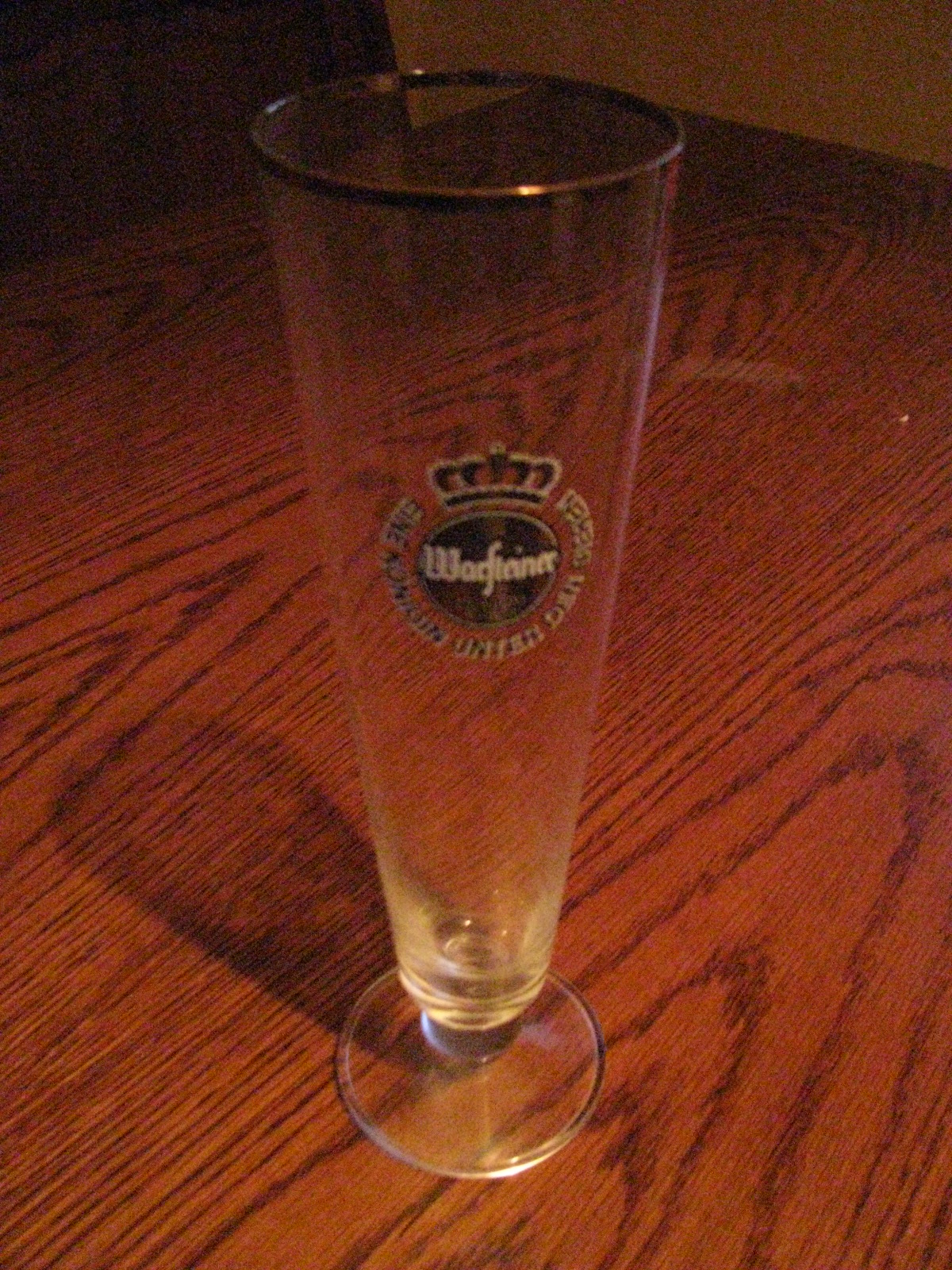
Warsteiner glass

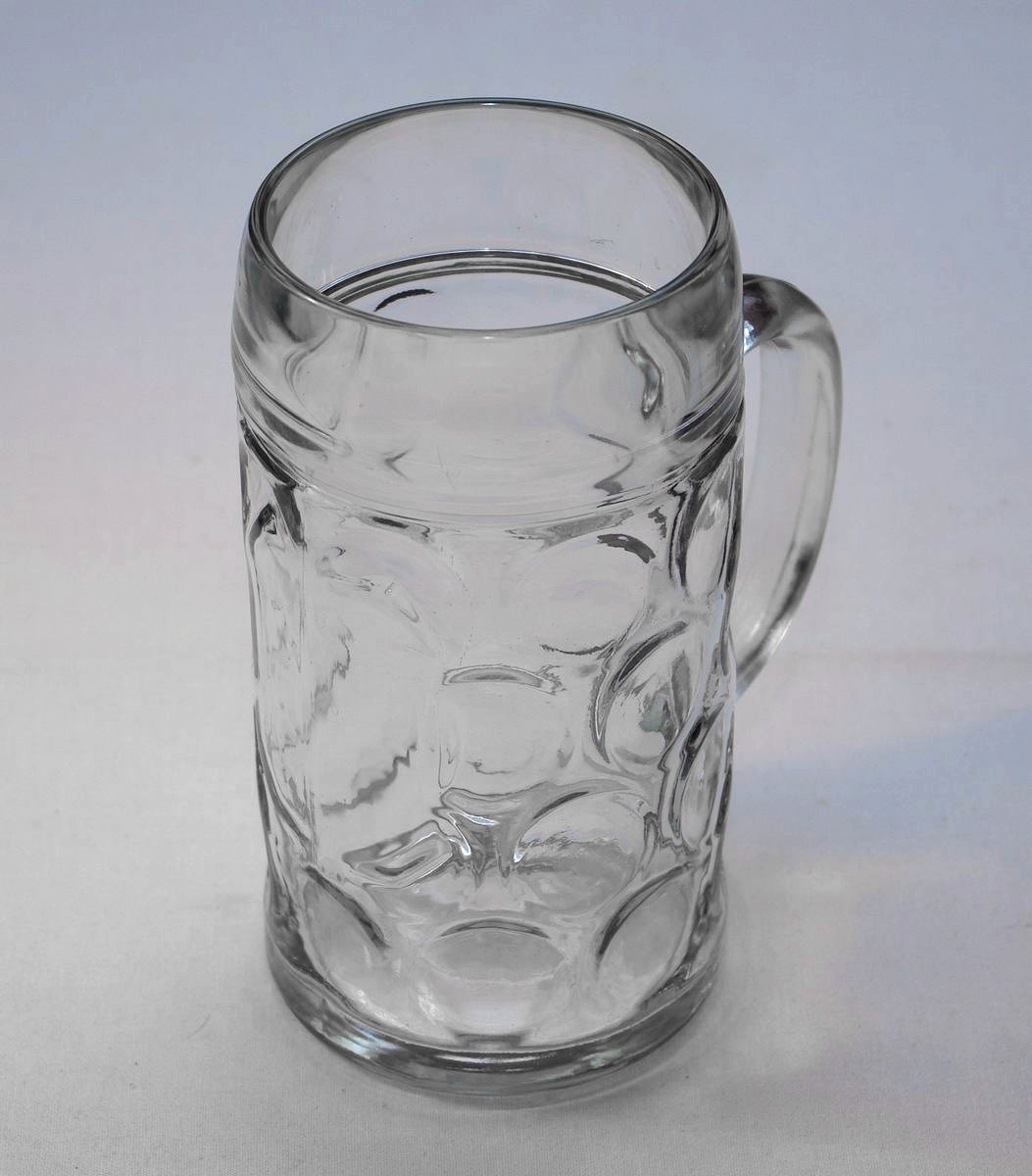
A Maßkrug

== Belgian and Dutch styles ==
Stronger or bottled beers are frequently served in specially made, elaborately branded glassware. In addition to the profusion of glasses provided by brewers, some Belgian beer cafés serve beer in their own "house" glassware, which avoids having to keep a large number of different glass types in stock.

=== Flute glass ===
A vessel similar to a champagne flute is often the preferred serving vessel for Belgian lambics and fruit beers. The narrow shape helps maintain carbonation, while providing a strong aromatic front. Flute glasses display the lively carbonation, sparkling color, and soft lacing of this distinct style.

=== Goblet or chalice ===
Chalices and goblets are large, stemmed, bowl-shaped glasses considered suitable for serving heavy Belgian ales, German bocks, and other big sipping beers. The distinction between goblet and chalice is typically in the glass thickness. Goblets tend to be thick, while the chalice is thin walled. Some chalices are even etched on the bottom to nucleate a stream of bubbles for maintaining a nice head.

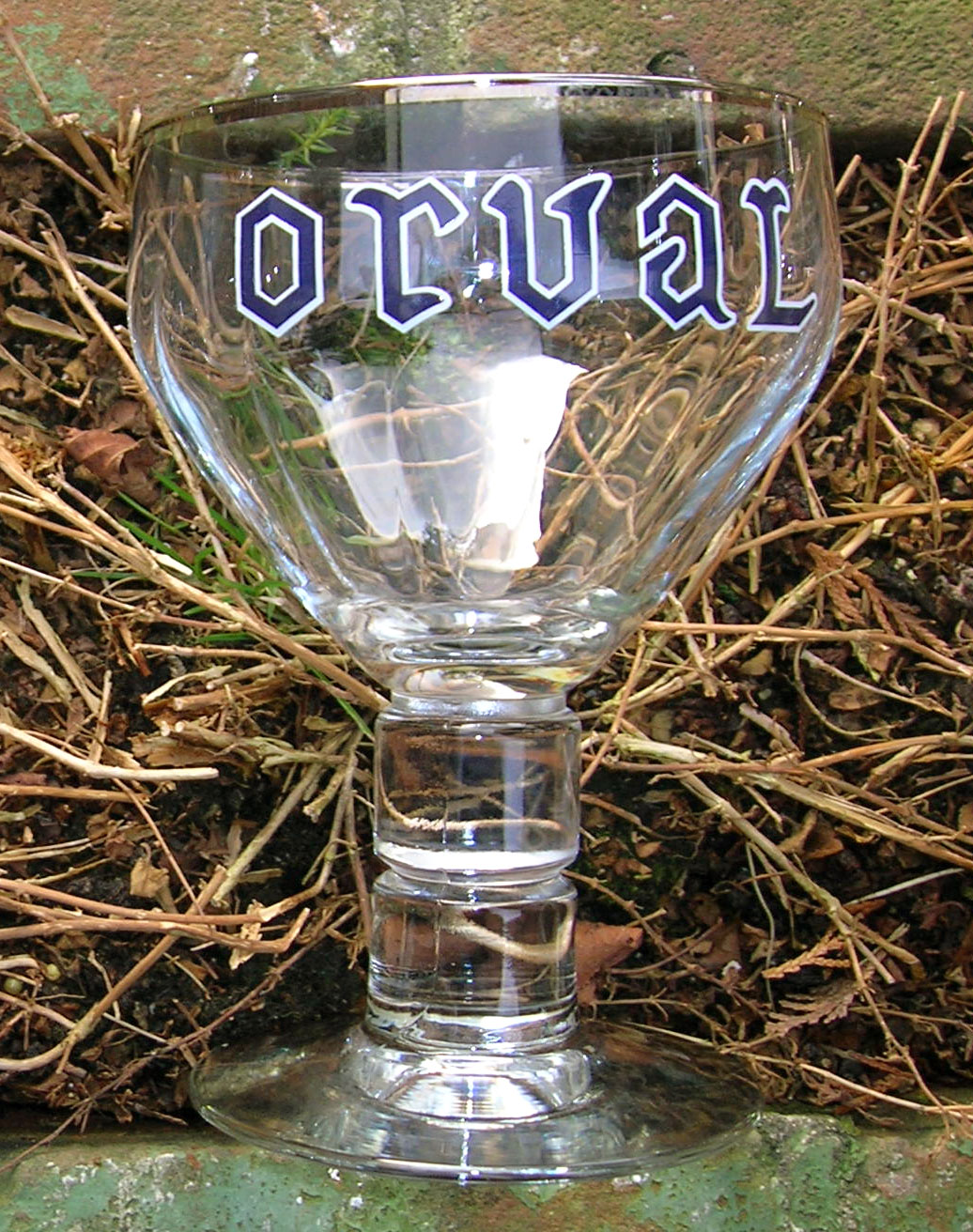
Orval beer's "chalice" glass

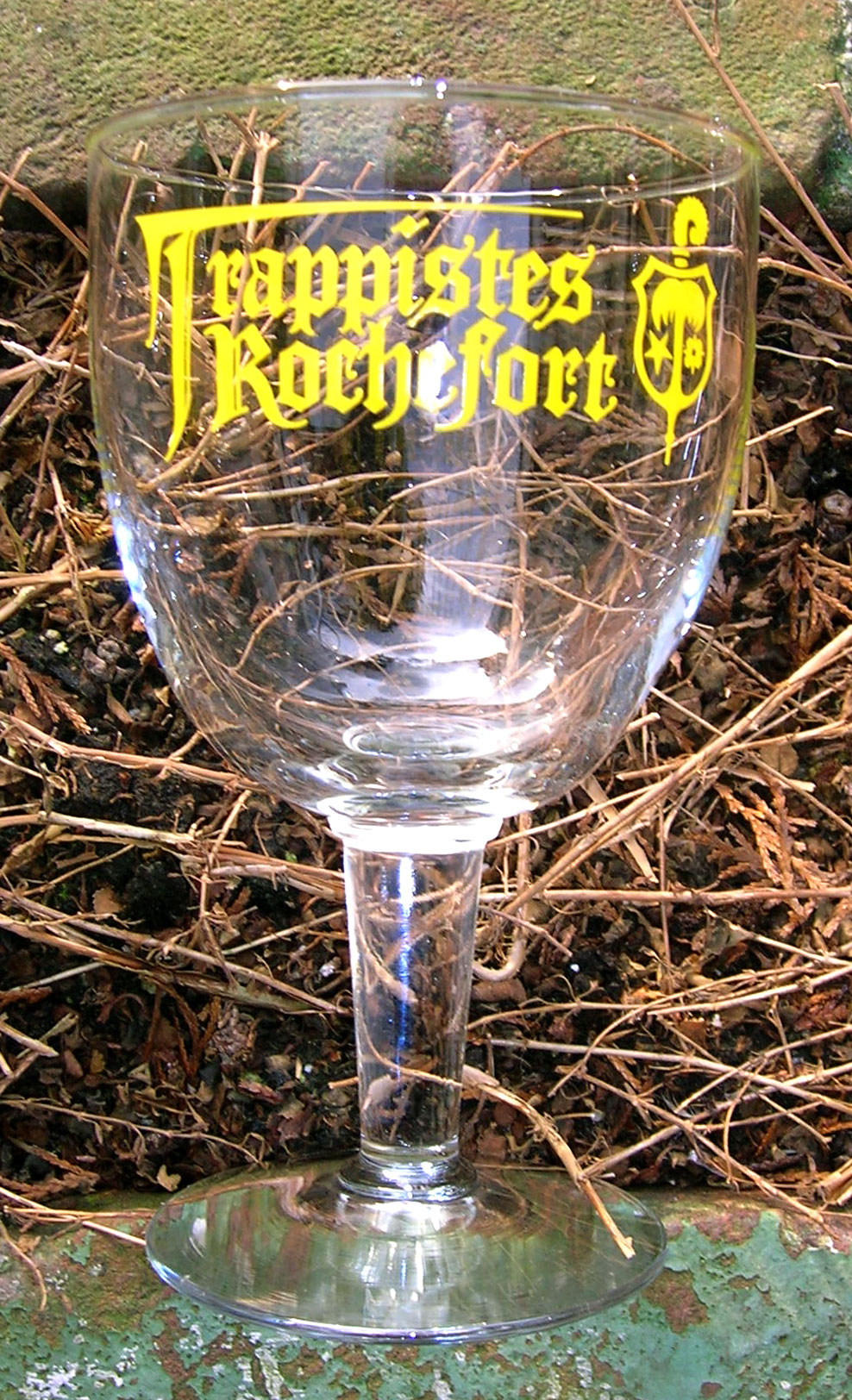
Rochefort beer's "goblet" glass

=== Tulip glass ===
A tulip glass has a shape similar to a brandy snifter. The body is bulbous, like a snifter, but the top flares out to form a lip which helps head retention. It is recommended for serving Scottish ales, American double/imperial IPAs, barley wines, Belgian ales and other aromatic beers. Some pint glasses that taper outwards towards the top are also called tulip glasses, despite having noticeably less curvature.

=== Gallery ===
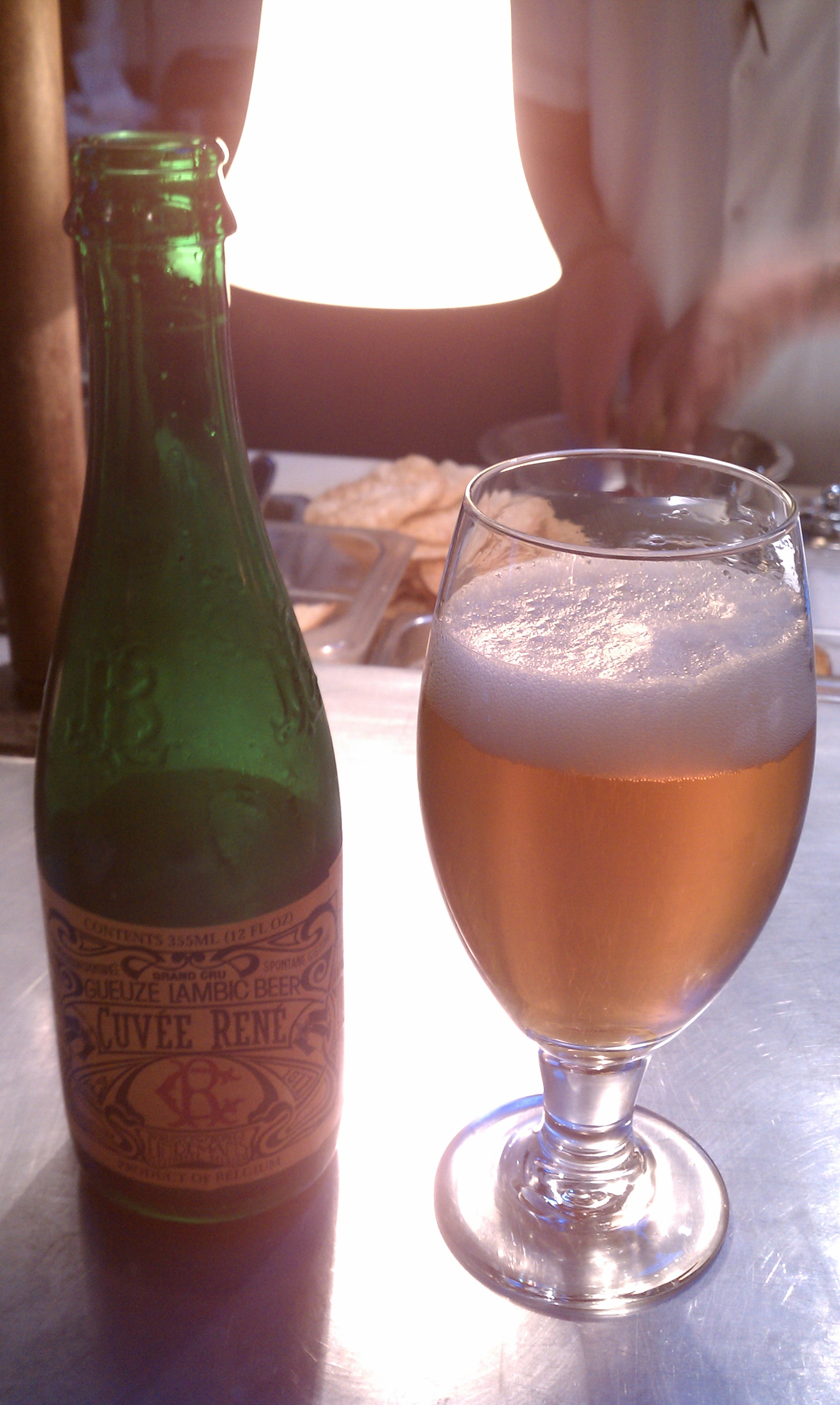
Geuze lambic beer in a flute glass

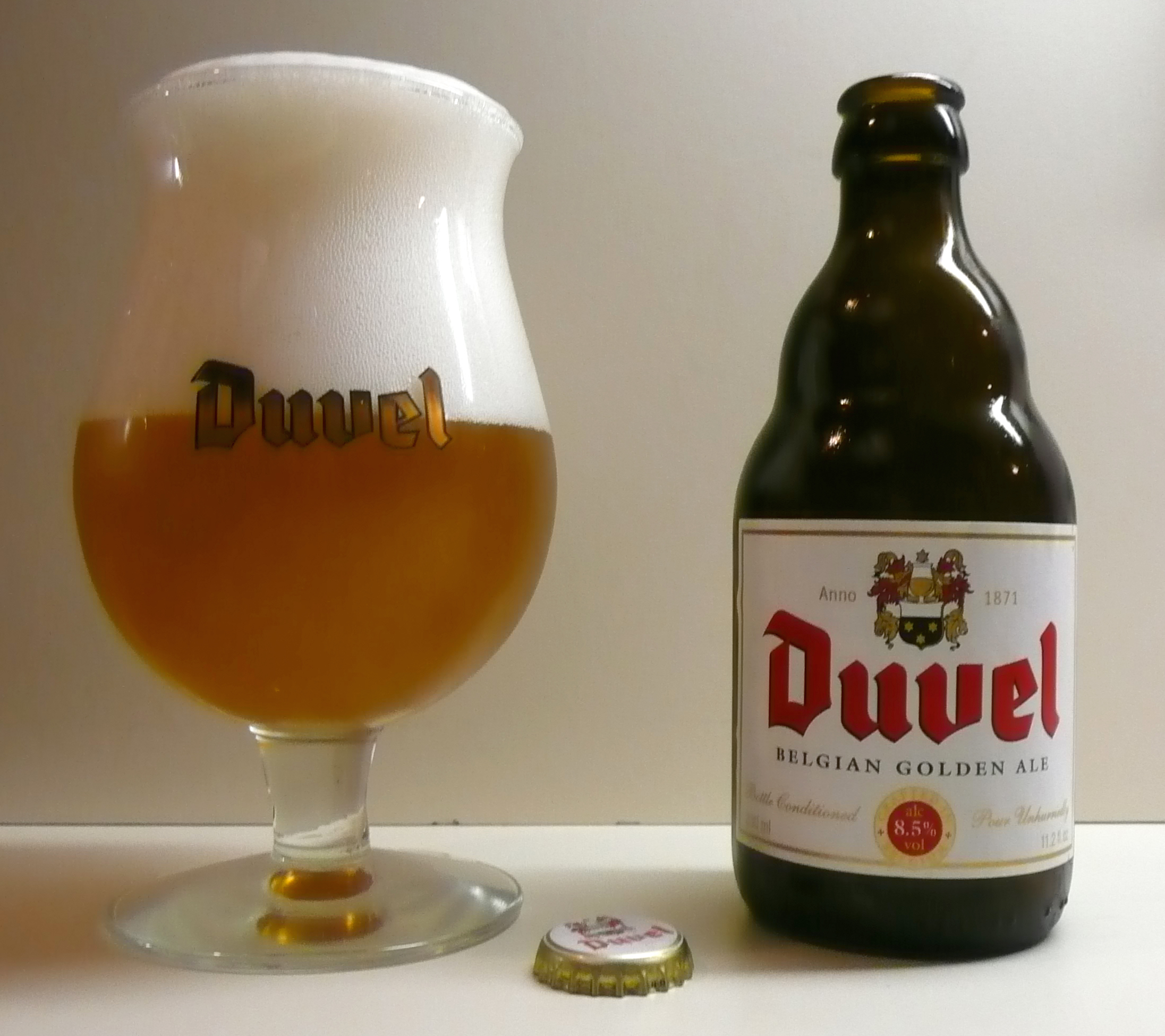
The Belgian ale Duvel in its tulip glass

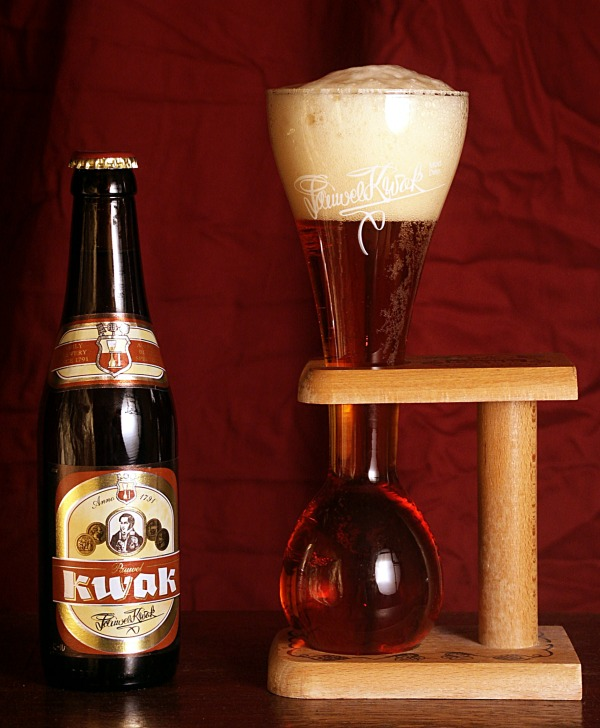
Kwak beer with its unusual glass and stand

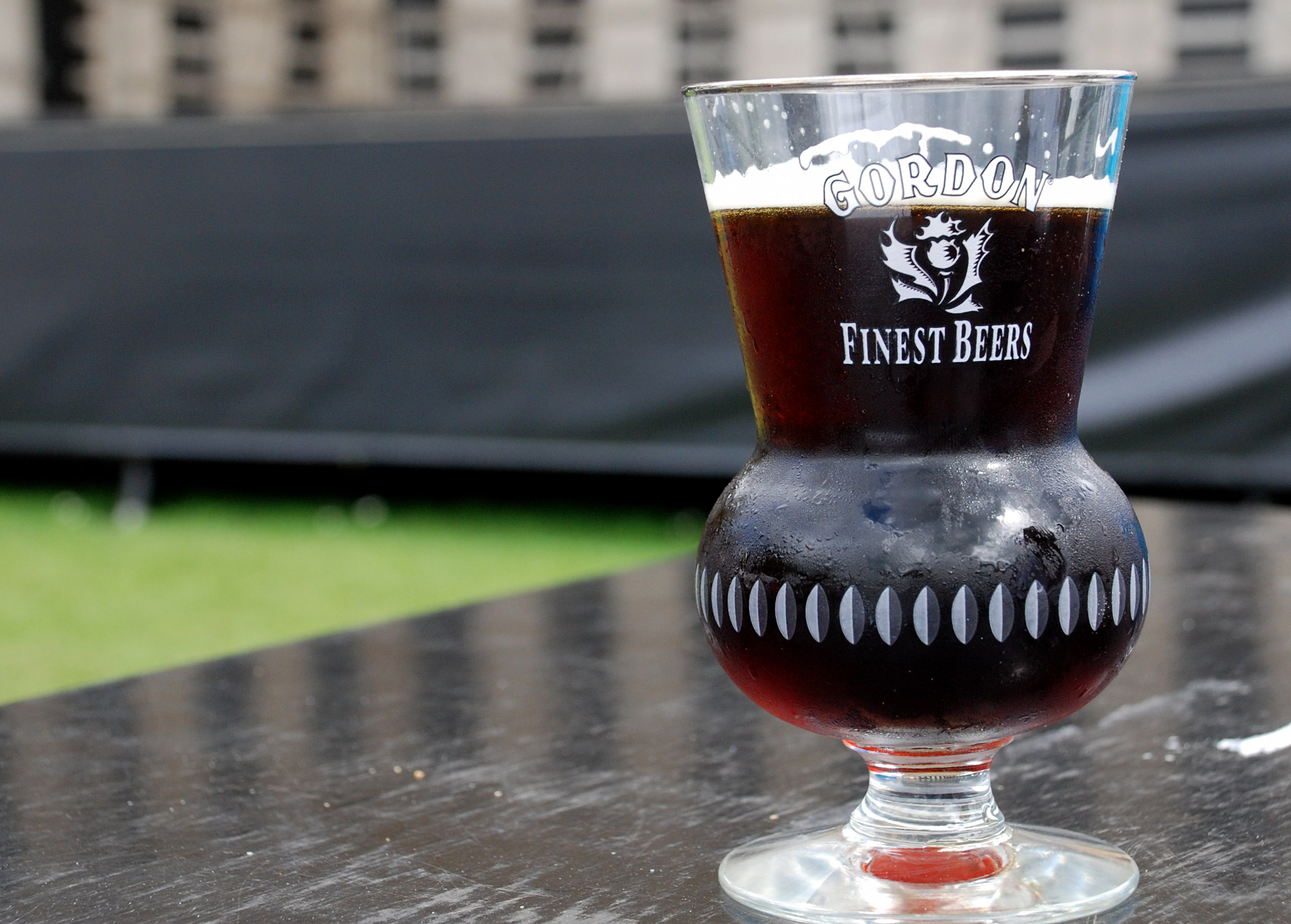
A thistle-shaped glass complements Belgian Scotch ales

== British and Irish styles ==
=== Tankard ===
A tankard is a form of drinkware consisting of a large, roughly cylindrical, drinking cup with a single handle. Tankards are usually made of silver, pewter, or glass, but can be made of other materials, for example wood, ceramic or leather. A tankard may have a hinged lid, and tankards featuring glass bottoms are also fairly common. Tankards are shaped and used similarly to beer steins. Metal tankards were popular in 18th and early 19th century Britain and Ireland, but were largely superseded by glass vessels. They are now seen as collector's items, or may be engraved and presented as a gift. Wooden and leather tankards were popular before the 17th century, but being made of organic materials have rarely survived intact to the present day.

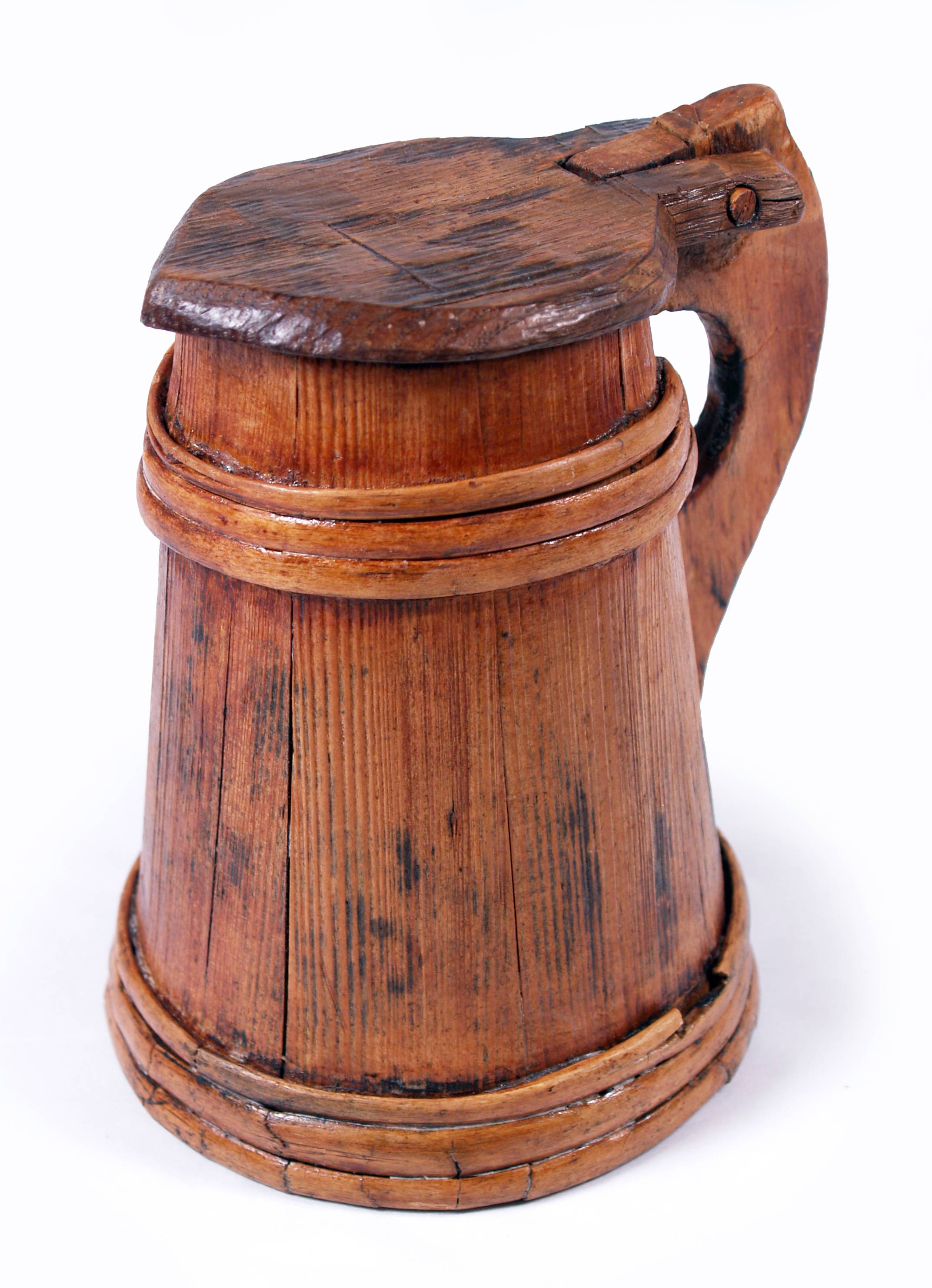
Reconstructed 16 CE wooden tankard

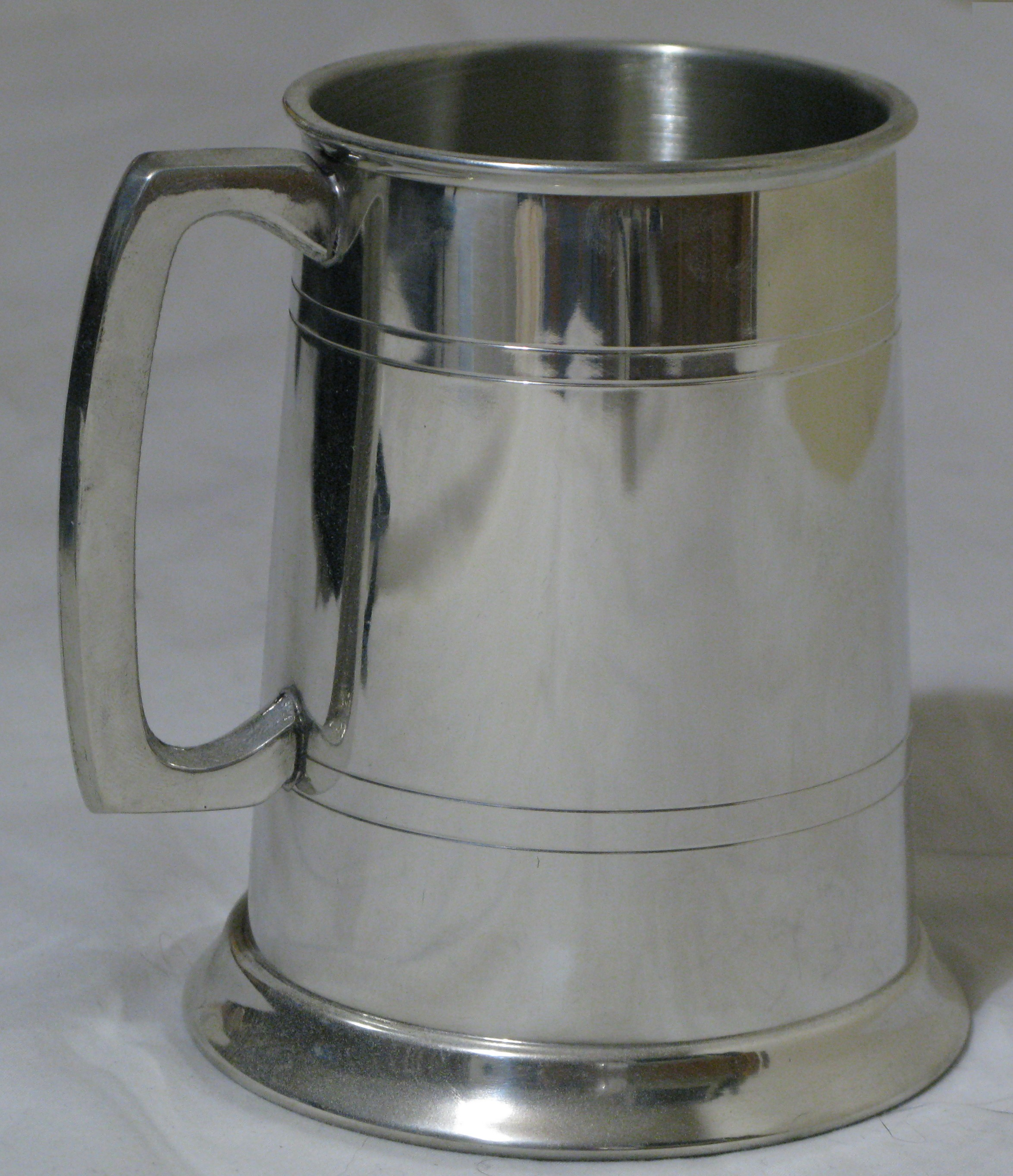
Pewter tankard

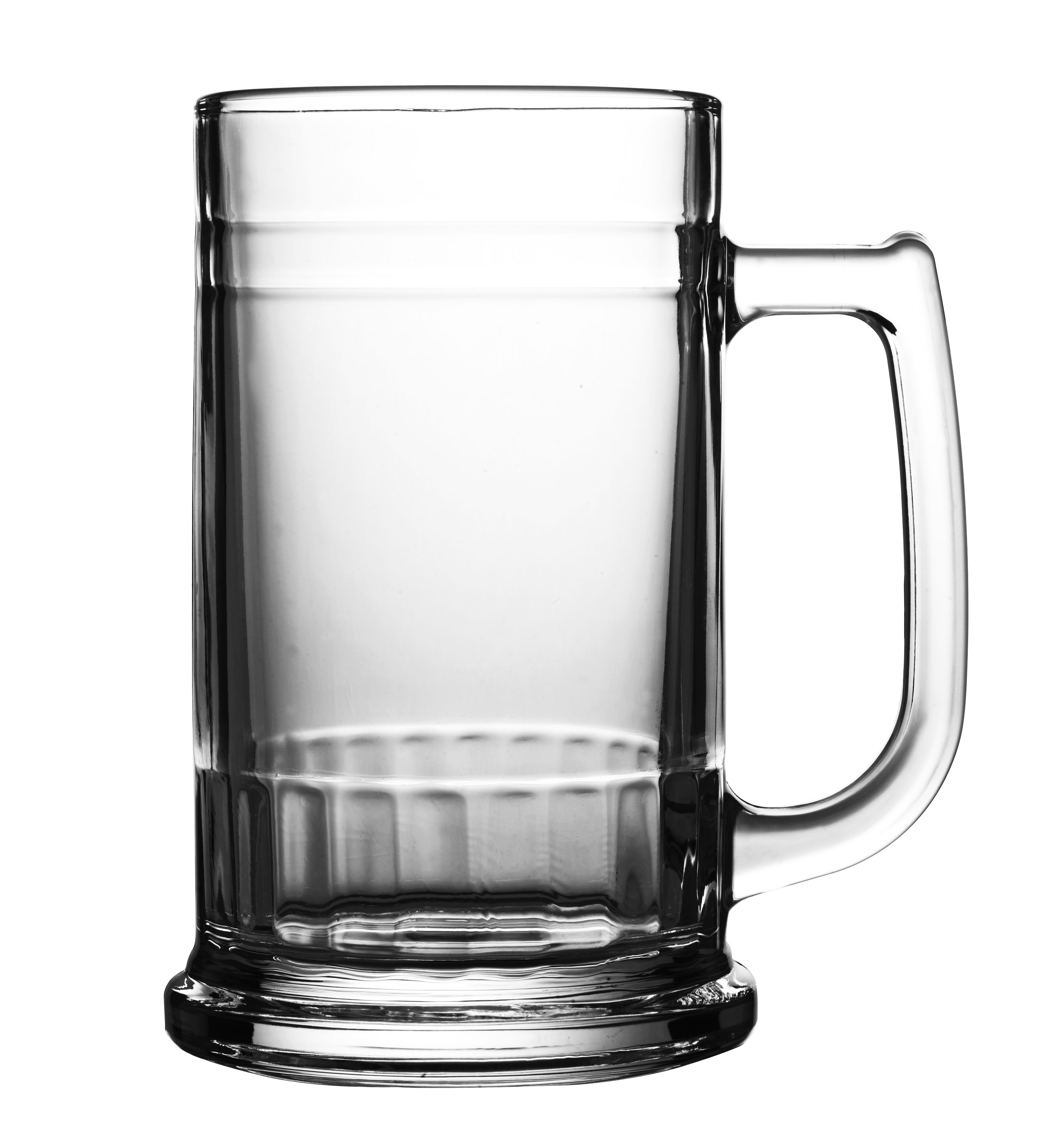
Glass tankard

=== Yard of ale ===
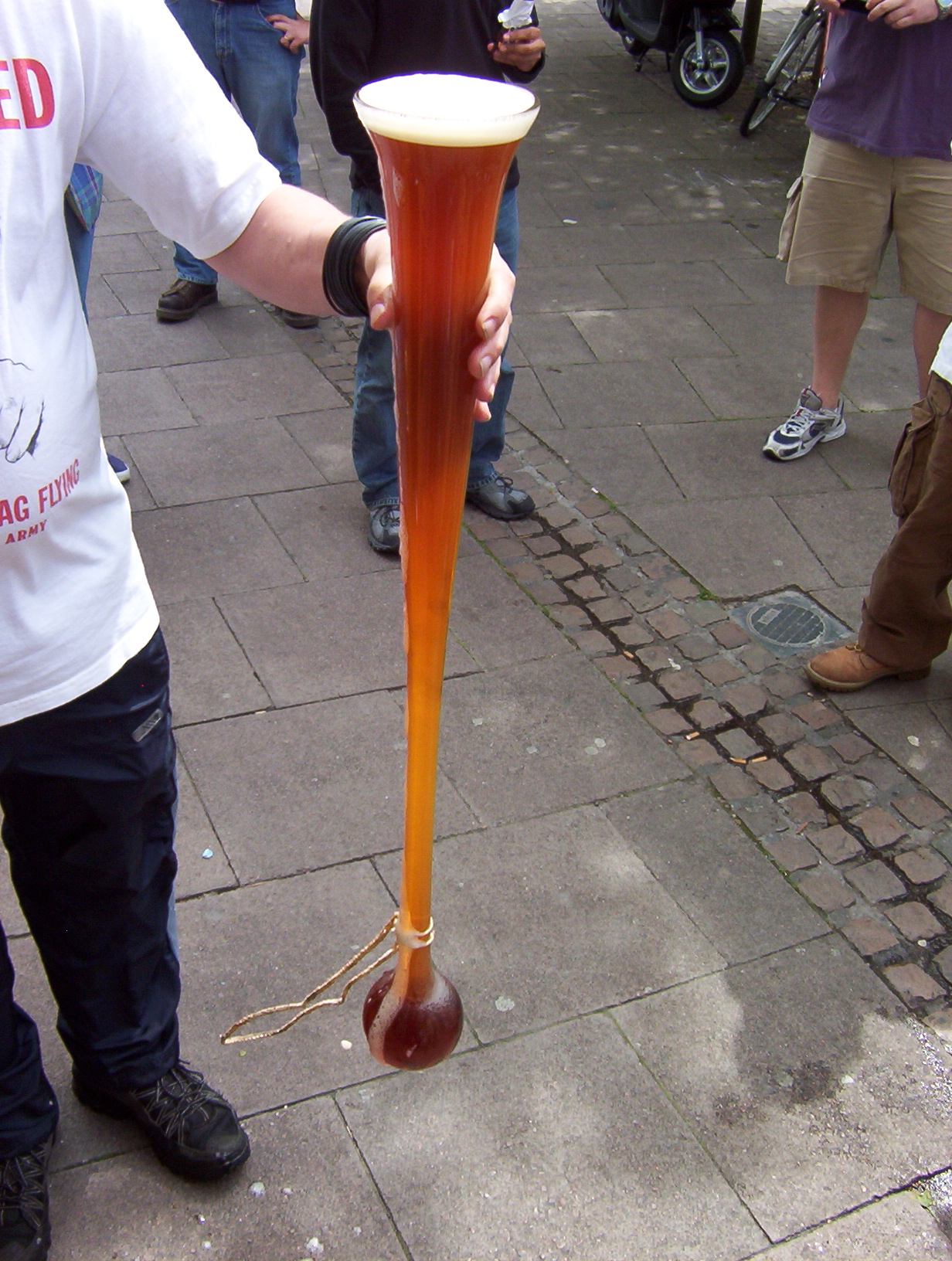
A yard of ale

A yard of ale or yard glass is a very tall glass used for drinking around 2.5 imperial pints (1,400 ml) of beer, depending upon the diameter. The glass is approximately 1 yard (91 cm) long, shaped with a bulb at the bottom, and a widening shaft which constitutes most of the height.

The glass most likely originated in 17th-century England where the glass was known also as a "Long Glass", a "Cambridge Yard (Glass)" and an "Ell Glass". It is associated by legend with stagecoach drivers, though was mainly used for drinking feats and special toasts. (Compare with the Pauwel Kwak glass).

Drinking a yard glass full of beer is a traditional pub game. The fastest drinking of a yard of ale in the Guinness Book of Records is 5 seconds.

== Capacity ==
Beer Glassware Using Metric Measurements
Volume	France	Belgium	Netherlands	Germany	Austria	Switzerland	Czechia	Italy	Spain
125 ml	Galopin, Bock	Benjamin			Pfiff			Birrino	Zurito (Basque)
200 ml		Flûte, Hollandais	Fluitje, Buisje, Pijpje	Stange (Cologne, but only for Kölsch)		Galopin (French), Herrgöttli (German)		Birra Piccola	Caña
250 ml	Demi, Bock	Boerke, Chope, Pintje	Vaasje, Emmertje, Rendsje,						Botellín
300 ml		Seidl, Seitel, Seiterl	Jonker		Seidl, Seitel, Seiterl	Becher, Stange, Rugeli			
330 ml		Gourde, Klepke				Canette	Třetinka		Tercio, Mediana
400 ml								Birra Media	
500 ml	Distingué, Baron, Mini-chevalier, Chope, Pinte, Sérieux	Demi, Bierpot	Pul, Halve Leo	Seidel, Seidla, Halbe (Southern Germany), Humpen	Krügel, Krügerl, Halbe	Chope (French), Grosses (German)	Půllitr, Holba		Pinta
1000 ml	Chevalier, Parfait, Double Pinte, Formidable	Corbeau, Lunette, Litron		Maß	Maß	Masse/Litron (French), Mass (German)	Tuplák	Birra Grande	
2000 ml					Stiefel, Liesl				

Beer Glassware Using Imperial Measurements
	UK	Ireland	Australia
5 fl oz			Pony
10 fl oz	Middy, Half, Ten	Middy, Half, Ten	Middy, Half, Pot, Handle
15 fl oz			Schooner
20 fl oz	Pint	Pint	Pint
40 fl oz	Quart	Quart	Jug

== Australian measures ==
Prior to metrication in Australia, one could buy beer in glasses of size 4, 5, 6, 7, 10, 15 or 20 imperial fluid ounces. Each sized glass had a different name in each Australian state. These were replaced by glasses of size 115, 140, 170, 200, 285, 425 and 570 ml. Progressively, the differences are decreasing. In the 21st century, most pubs no longer have a glass smaller than 200 ml (7 imp fl oz); typically available are 200ml, 285ml and 425ml, and increasingly many pubs also have pints 570 millilitres (20.1 imp fl oz) available.

Names of beer glasses in various Australian cities (Note: Entries in bold are common.) (Note: Entries in italics are old-fashioned or rare.) (Note: Entries marked with a dash are not applicable.)
Capacity (Note: The "fl oz" referred to here is the imperial fluid ounce.)	Sydney	Canberra	Darwin	Brisbane	Adelaide	Hobart	Melbourne	Perth
115 ml (4 fl oz)	–	–	–	–	-	small beer	foursie	shetland
140 ml (5 fl oz)	pony	–	–	pony	pony	–	horse/pony	pony
170 ml (6 fl oz)	–	–	–	–	butcher (Note: Before metrification, the butcher was 6 fl oz.)	six (ounce)	–	bobbie/six
200 ml (7 fl oz)	seven	–	**seven**	**beer**	**butcher**	seven (ounce)	**glass**	glass
285 ml (10 fl oz)	**middy**	**middy** / half pint	**handle**	**pot** (Note: "Pot" is also known as Pot glass)	**schooner** (Note: Confusingly for visitors, South Australians use the same names for different volumes than in the other States.)	**ten (ounce)**	**pot**	**middy** / half pint
350 ml (12 fl oz)	schmiddy (Note: A modern glass size, mainly used with European beers. While the glass may be 350ml, a 330ml or 300ml fill line is common. With the increasing popularity of European beers, glasses of size 250ml and 500ml are also becoming more prevalent, but as yet don't seem to have acquired "names".)	–	–	–	–	–	–	–
425 ml (15 fl oz)	**schooner**	**schooner**	**schooner**	**schooner**	**pint**	fifteen / **schooner**	**schooner**	schooner (Note: Traditionally, 425 ml is a size rarely found in Western Australia.)
570 ml (20 fl oz)	**pint**	**pint**	pint	**pint**	**imperial pint**	**pint**	**pint**	**pint**
Notes:							References: 1. The Aussie Beer Baron; 2. Buying Beer in Australia; 3. Guidelines at a glance 4. Ordering Beer; 5. Liquor Merchants Association of Australia (via archive.org); 6. Which Size Beer Do Ya Want, Mate? (via archive.org); 7. Take a butcher's hook at the butcher glass	

== See also ==
- Beer bottle
- Beer tower
- Beerfest
