= Broken Spur (cocktail) =

Classic cocktail

- Type: Mixed drink
- Ingredients: 2/3 white port; 1/6 gin; 1/6 vermouth; 1 tsp anisette; 1 egg yolk
- Standard drinkware: Champagne coupe
- Standard garnish: Lemon peel or freshly grated nutmeg
- Preparation: Combine ingredients with ice in cocktail shaker; shake well, then strain into cocktail glass, pouring over ice.

The Broken Spur cocktail is a mixed drink with white port, vermouth, gin, egg yolk and a splash of anisette for flavor. The recipe is found in The Savoy Cocktail Book. Some recipes replace the anisette with Pernod. The cocktail is shaken with ice and served in a coupé glass garnished with a twist of lemon peel or dusted with freshly grated nutmeg.
