= Stemware =

Drinkware that stands on stems above a base

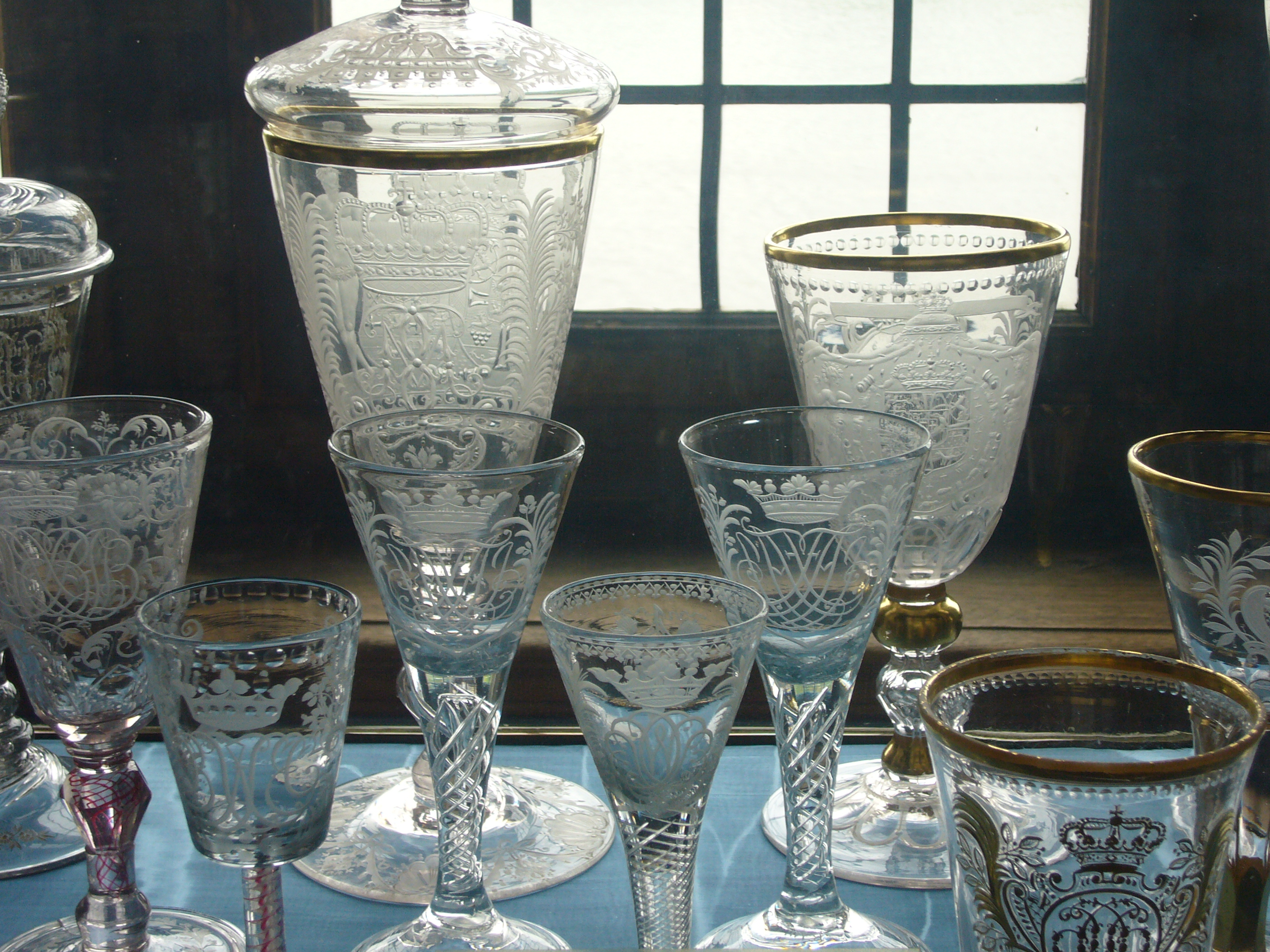
18th century stemware from the museum at Frederiksborg Palace, Denmark

Stemware is drinkware where the bowl stands on a stem above a foot (base that allows to put the vessel down onto a table). It is usually made from glass, but may be made from ceramics or metals. The stemware is intended for cool beverages, like water or wine. The stem allows the drinker to hold the glass without affecting the temperature of the drink. The snifters represent an exception, as they are designed to hold the bowl in a cup of the hand to warm up the beverage.

== History ==
The glass stemware, with either flat or domed feet, appeared in Middle Ages. Prior to that, a typical drinking vessel made of glass was either a tumbler (unlike the modern ones, these have rounded bases and could literally tumble) or a pointed-base design intended for insertion into the ground or streambed for cooling.

The early designs of the foot used thick rims manufactured by folding edges of the foot over itself. This prevented cracking, but increased the weight of the glass, so in England, simple flat bases appeared once the excise tax, based on the vessel weight, was introduced in 1745.

== Bowls ==
Modern stemware uses primarily these three types of bowls:

- bucket-shaped bowl has a flat bottom and near-vertical sides;
- tulip-shaped bowl has a round bottom and walls with an S-shaped cross-section;
- flared bowl has a long vertical form with either a pointed or round bottom and an optional flare-out at the top.

Larger bowls are used for nonalcoholic beverages (historically, they were also used for low-alcohol drinks, like beer or mead). Medium-sized bowls are used for wine; small bowls are for high-alcohol-content drinks like aperitifs and dessert wines; and very small bowls are used for cordials and liquors. Here the snifters are an exception again: they might have large bowls while intended for high-alcohol drinks.

The shape of the bowl affects the taste of the beverage. In particular, the French wine quality testing is performed using a special "INAO" glass with an egg-shaped bowl, short stem, and wide foot.

== Vessels ==
Stemware includes:

- Aperitif glasses
- Absinthe glasses
- Champagne flutes
- Chalices and goblets
- Cocktail glasses (including martini glasses and margarita glasses)
- Cordial glasses
- Dessert wine glasses
- Iced-tea glasses
- Liqueur glasses
- Rummers
- Snifters
- Wine glasses for white wine, red wine, and champagne

== Sources ==
- Cech, Mary; Schact, Jennie (2005). The Wine Lover's Dessert Cookbook: Recipes and Pairings for the Perfect Glass of Wine. San Francisco: Chronicle Books. ISBN 9780811842372.
- Rinker, Harry L. (1997). Stemware of the 20th Century: The Top 200 Patterns (1st ed.). New York: House of Collectibles. ISBN 9780676600841.
- Von Drachenfels, Susanne (2000). "Stemware". The Art of the Table: A Complete Guide to Table Setting, Table Manners, and Tableware. Simon & Schuster. pp. 257–327. ISBN 978-0-684-84732-0.
