= Fill line =

Mark indicating container volume

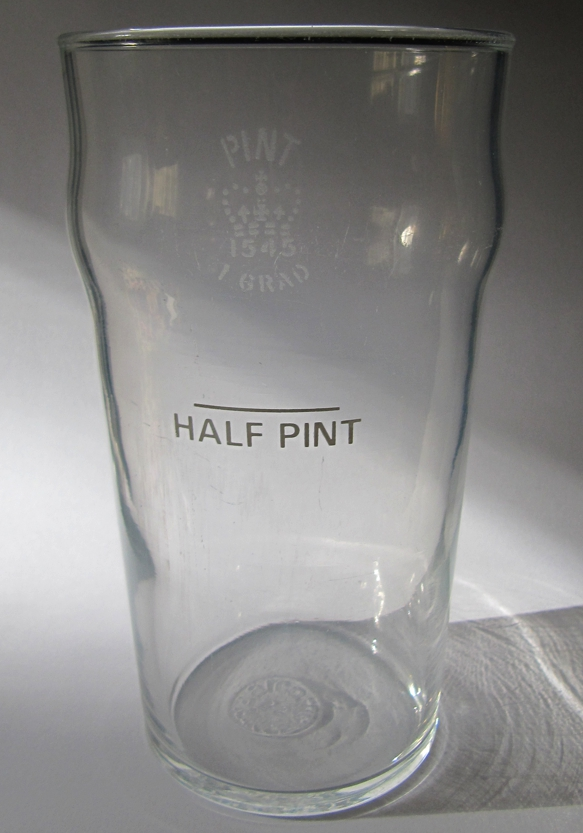
A British pint glass with a line indicating a half pint measure

A fill line is a marking on drinkware indicating the volume of liquid held by the glass. Many countries mandate fill lines on glasses used commercially as a consumer protection measure.

== European Union and Switzerland ==
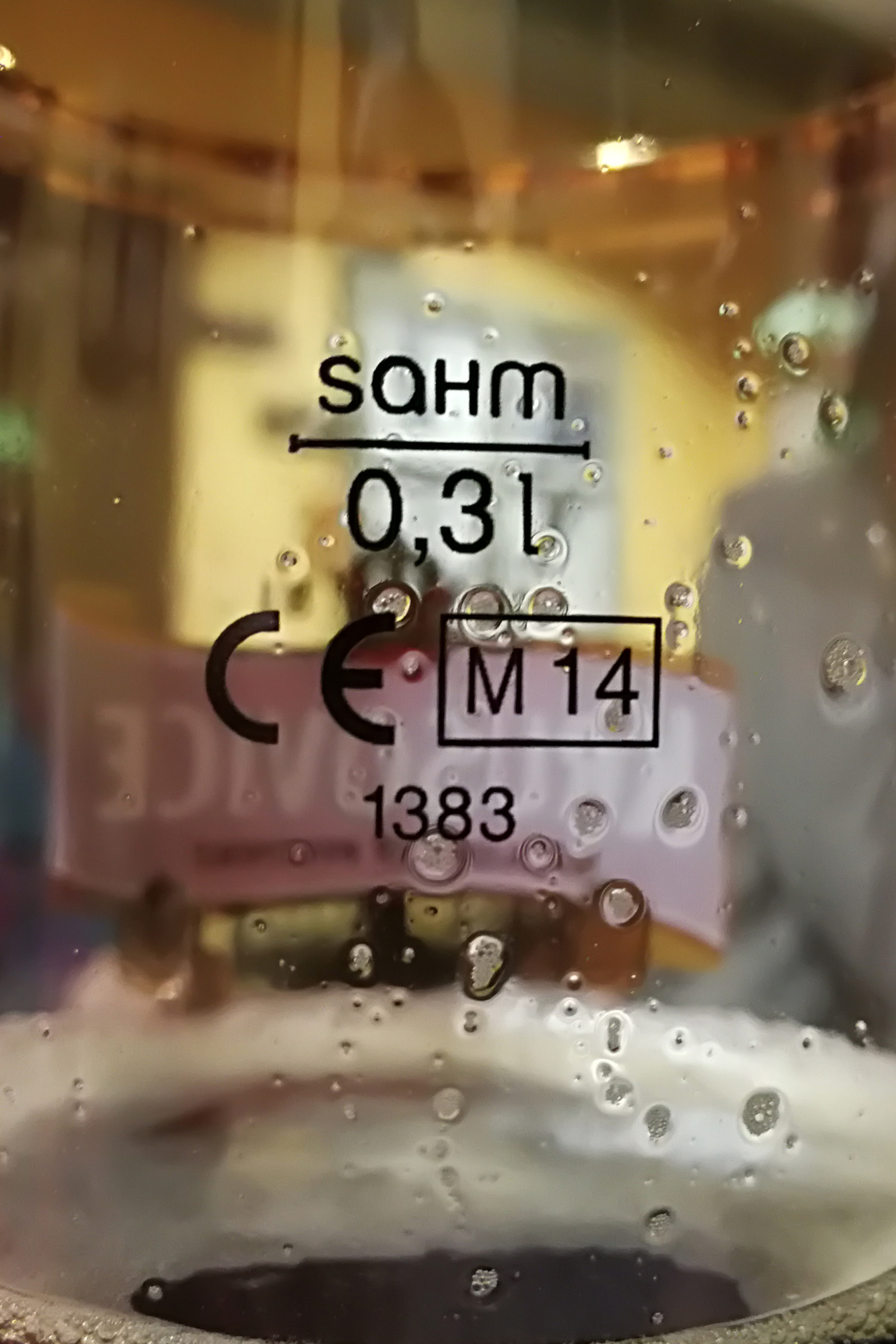
A fill line on a Czech beer glass. The fill line is accompanied by the manufacturer (Sahm), the volume (0.3 litres), a CE marking, year (2014), and a code indicating the supervising body (1383).

Each of the European Union member states had a variety of weights and measures acts regarding legal metrology for all measuring devices used in commerce, including drinkware. As part of the EU's 2004 Measuring Instruments Directive (2004/22/EC), these were harmonised. The transitional period ended on 30 October 2016, meaning all drinkware produced or sold in the EU or Switzerland after this date must conform to the EU directive.

=== Austria ===
In Austria, fill lines are governed by the Beverage Container Regulation (German: Schankgefäßeverordnung), which provides error tolerances; glasses between 10 and 50 ml must be within 5% of the declared volume; larger containers must be accurate within 3%.

=== Germany ===
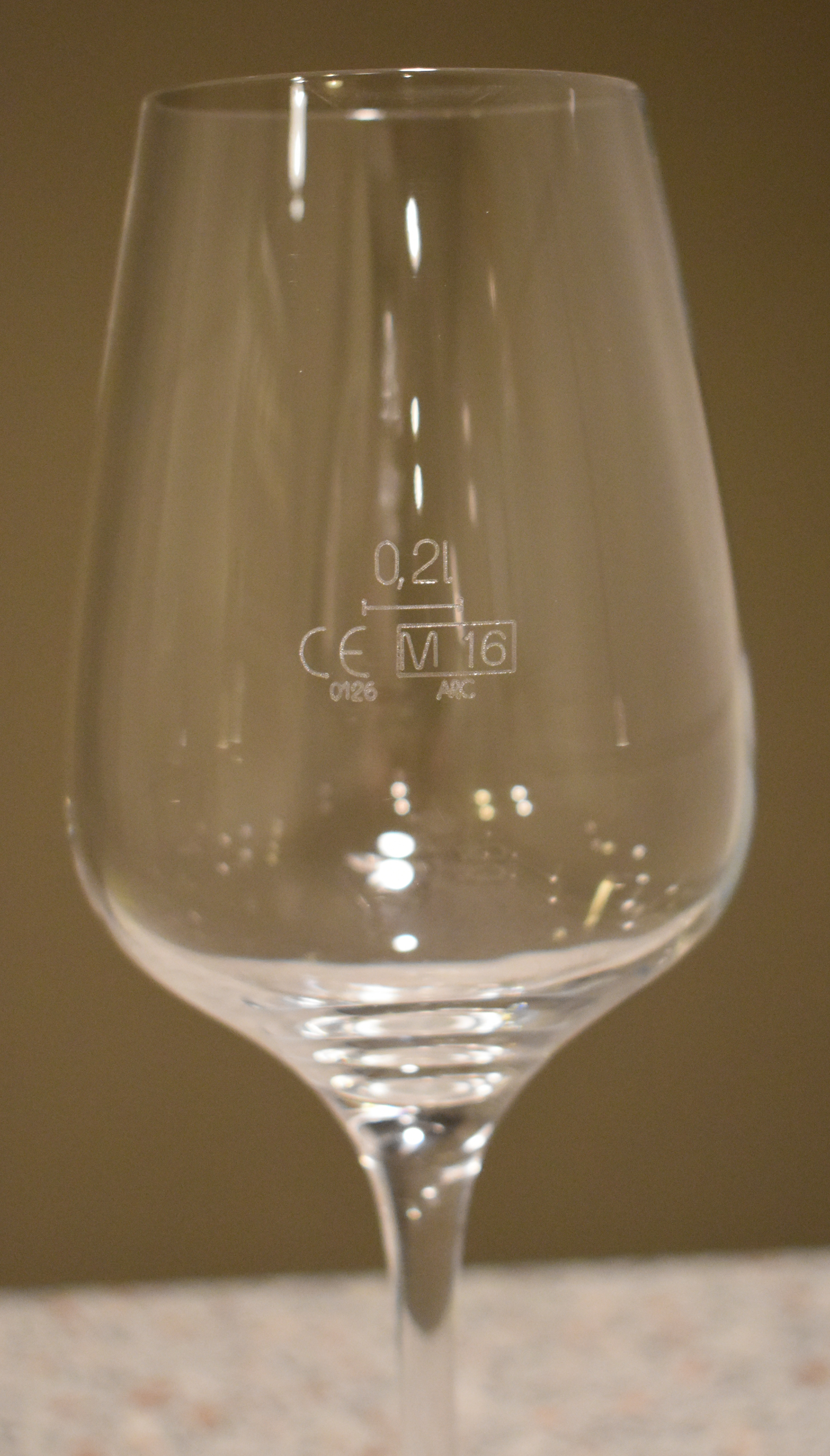
A fill line on a German wine glass

Germany has had a number of weights and measures acts specifically addressing volumetric markings on glassware. Local and state laws have since been superseded by the federal Mess- und Eichgesetz ("Measurement and Calibration Act"), which in turn was updated to implement the EU directive.

All glassware used in a commercial setting is required to have a marking indicating the volume of the container, along with an identifier that indicates the manufacturer. The manufacturer identifiers are issued by the Physikalisch-Technische Bundesanstalt in Braunschweig, such as "Bö" for Böckling, "ra" or "rastal" for Rastal, or "Sahm" for "Sahm", or "Kö" for Kössinger.

The technical specifications are written towards ensuring consumer protection. The fill line must be horizontal and at least 10 mm long; depending on the size of the glass, a certain distance is required to the rim of the glass. Some glasses may also have a second fill line half-way down the glass.

== Commonwealth countries ==
In countries using Imperial units, fill lines are not as common for pint glasses. In the United Kingdom, pint glasses typically hold one imperial pint (20 imp fl oz; 568 ml) when filled to the brim. Pint glasses commonly have a fill line for the volume of one-half of an imperial pint (284 ml).

Although the glass must be accurately-calibrated, industry guidelines only require a pint to be at least 95% liquid, allowing 5% of the pint to consist of the foamy 'head'. The Campaign for Real Ale (CAMRA) has described this practice as selling a short measure, and says that it costs drinkers £1m a day in beer they have paid for but not received. The British Beer and Pub Association has issued guidelines for bar staff to give a 'top up' to any drinker who is unsatisfied with the measure they receive.

CAMRA recommends the use of "lined" or "oversized" glasses in pubs. These have a line near the top (usually labelled "pint to line") to which the beer should be poured, with the head forming above it.
