= Champagne glass =

Stemware specialized for sparkling wine

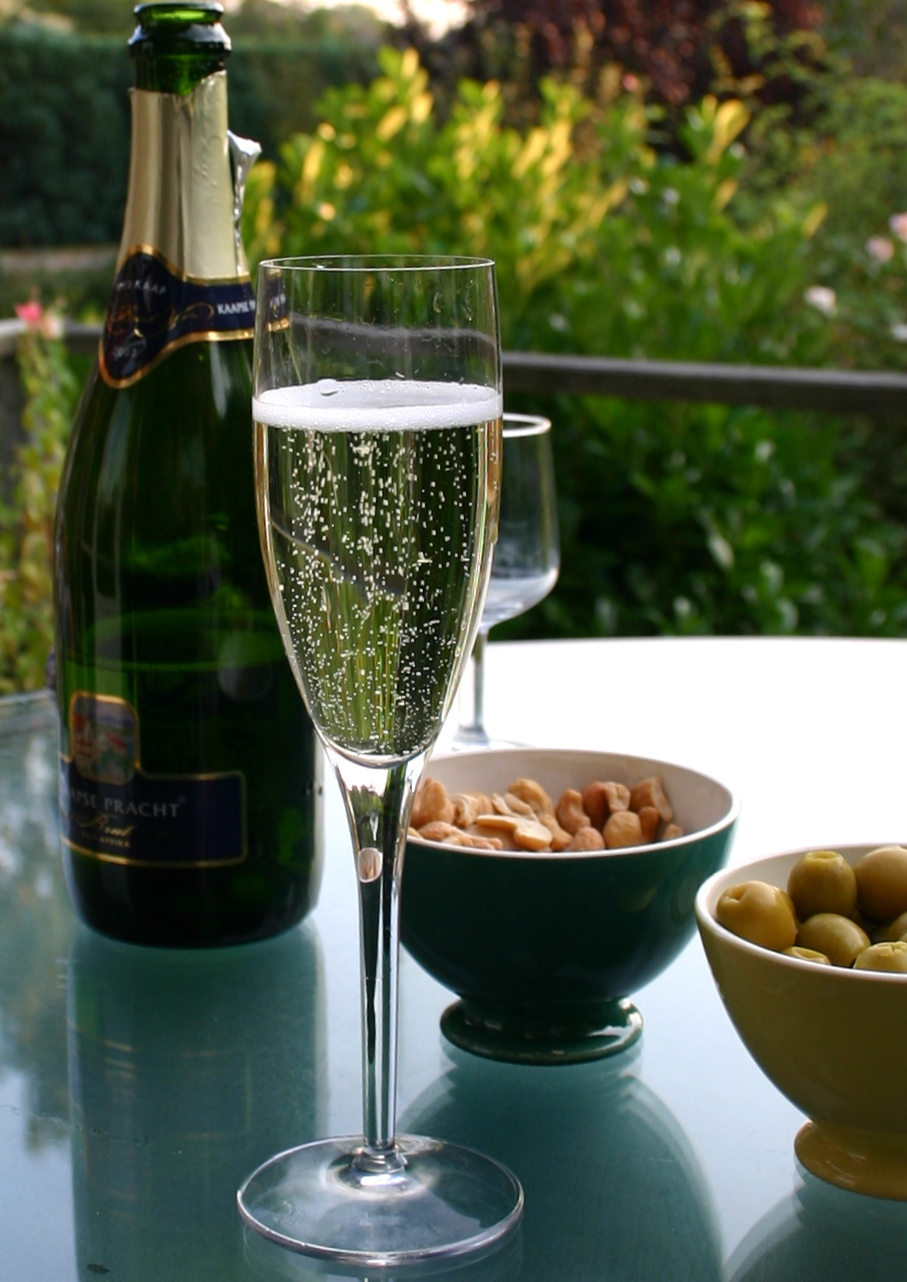
Champagne flute and bottle

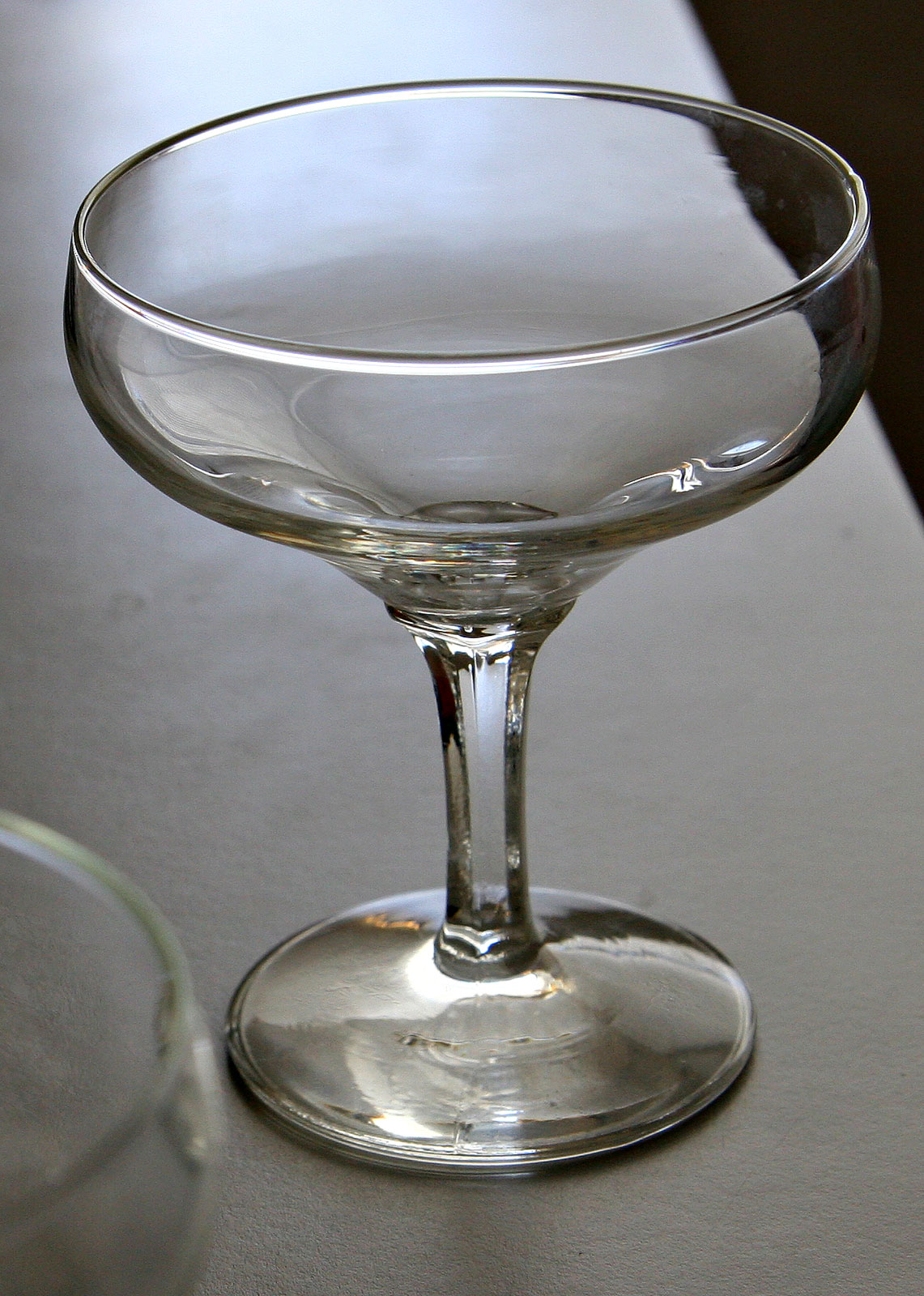
Champagne coupe

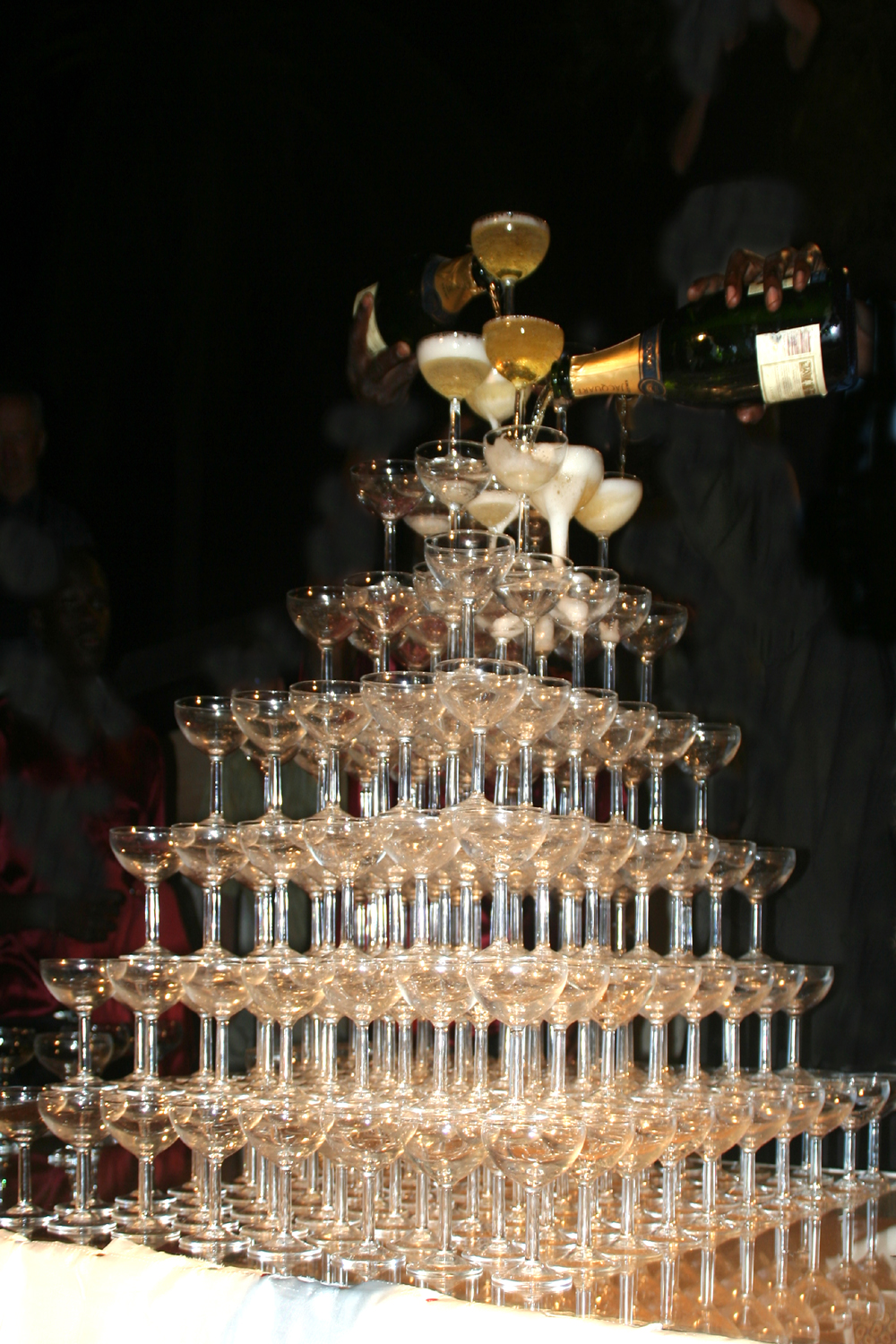
Champagne tower

A champagne glass is stemware designed for champagne and other sparkling wines. The two most common forms are the flute and coupe, both stemmed; holding the glass by the stem prevents warming the drink. Champagne can also be drunk from a normal wine glass, which allows better appreciation of the flavor, at the expense of accentuating the bubbles less.

== Flute ==
The champagne flute (French: flûte à champagne) is a stem glass with either a tall tapered conical shape or elongated slender bowl, generally holding about 180 to 200 ml (6.1 to 6.8 US fl oz) of liquid.

The earliest examples of flute-like glasses date back to the Roman era. In modern times those made at Murano near Venice, being of fine craftsmanship, greatly grew in popularity during the 16th century and were subsequently exported and mimicked in England and the Netherlands. During the late 17th century it was aggressively promoted as "the glass of fashion" by Charles de Saint-Évremond, while he was in exile at the court of Charles II, and its popularity grew as a champagne glass throughout the 18th century in England and France.

The champagne flute was developed along with other wine stemware in the early 18th century as the preferred shape for sparkling wine as materials for drinking vessels shifted from metal and ceramic to glassware. Initially, the flute was tall, conical, and slender; by the 20th century, preferences changed from a straight-sided glass to one which curved inward slightly near the lip.

This inward taper is designed to retain champagne's signature carbonation by reducing the surface area for it to escape. Nucleation in a champagne glass helps form the wine's bubbles; too much surface area allows carbonation to fizzle out quickly. More bubbles create greater texture in the taster's mouth, and a flute's deep bowl allows for greater visual effect of bubbles rising to the top. The flute's narrow cross-section also minimizes the oxygen-to-wine ratio, which enhances both the wine's aroma and taste. (Note: Sources disagree as to whether the narrow mouth of the flute created to capture a wine's aroma allows sufficient access to appreciate it. Wine writer Victoria Moore argues that the "Flutes are no good for champagne because they are too narrow to allow the odour molecules to gather in a place you can get your nose into.")

While most commonly used for sparkling wines, flutes are also used for certain beers, especially fruit beers and Belgian lambics and gueuzes. The flute shows off the beer's color, and helps gather the aroma for the nose. The champagne flute is distinguished from the pilsner glass, which lacks a stem.

== Coupe ==
The champagne coupe is a shallow, broad-bowled saucer shaped stemmed glass generally capable of containing 180 to 240 ml (6.1 to 8.1 US fl oz) of liquid. Originally called a tazza (cup), it first appeared circa 1663, when it was created by Venetian glassmakers employed at a Greenwich glass factory owned by the Duke of Buckingham. The tazza was designed to hold champagne, and after it was retitled 'champagne coupe' and marketed by early Victorian commerce, it became popular within the English high society. It originally became famous through the popularity of pink champagne and the white mousse which accompanied it, both of which complemented and were complemented by the saucer-shaped crystal coupe. The coupe was fashionable in France from its introduction in the 18th century until the 1970s, and in the United States from the 1930s to the 1980s. Coupes are also often used for cocktails served up in lieu of a cocktail glass on account of the latter glass's greater propensity to spilling.

== Tulip ==
Champagne is also served in a tulip glass. The white wine tulip is distinguishable from the champagne flute by its wider, flared body and mouth. Some oenophiles (wine lovers) prefer the tulip glass, as it permits the drinker to get more of the aroma than a traditional flute while the mouth is still narrow enough to avoid quick loss of carbonation. The Washington Post food columnist Dave McIntyre has argued that the tulip allows the champagne to move to the middle from the front of the tongue, allowing the wine's flavor to be better expressed. The glassmaker Riedel particularly criticizes flutes as one-dimensional, impairing drinkers' ability to appreciate a wine's full range of aromas and taste profiles.

== Double-wall stemware ==
In the 1960s, double-wall stemware was developed to slow the transfer of heat from a drinker's hand to champagne and other beverages. Inner and outer walls are separated by a small gap filled with air, a poor thermal conductor.

== See also ==
- Wine accessory

== Bibliography ==
- Andrews, Deborah (2014). Shopping: Material Culture Perspectives. Newark, N.J.: University of Delaware Press. ISBN 9781611495188.
- Blume, Lesley M.M.; McFerrin, Grady (2010). Let's Bring Back: An Encyclopedia of Forgotten-Yet-Delightful Chic, Useful, Curious, and Otherwise Commendable Things From Times Gone By. San Francisco: Chronicle Books. ISBN 9781452103501.
- Boehmer, Alan (14 October 2009). Knack Wine Basics: A Complete Illustrated Guide to Understanding, Selecting & Enjoying Wine. Rowman & Littlefield. ISBN 978-0-7627-5838-8.
- Bray, Charles (2001). Dictionary of Glass: Materials and Techniques. London: A. & C. Black. ISBN 9780713657920.
- Cech, Mary; Schact, Jennie (2005). The Wine Lover's Dessert Cookbook: Recipes and Pairings for the Perfect Glass of Wine. San Francisco: Chronicle Books. ISBN 9780811842372.
- DeGroff, Dale (2002). The Craft of the Cocktail. New York: Clarkson Potter. ISBN 9780609608753.
- Giblin, Sheri (2011). American Cocktail: 50 Recipes That Celebrate the Craft of Mixing Drinks From Coast to Coast. San Francisco: Chronicle Press. ISBN 9781452110332.
- Jackson, Michael (1908). Michael Jackson's Great Beers of Belgium. Philadelphia: Running Press. ISBN 9780762404032.
- Kohn, Rita (2013). The Complete Idiot's Guide to Beer Tasting. New York: Alpha Books. ISBN 9781615643523.
- Lamprey, Zane (16 March 2010). Three Sheets: Drinking Made Easy! 6 Continents, 15 Countries, 190 Drinks, and 1 Mean Hangover!. Random House Publishing Group. ISBN 978-0-345-52201-6.
- Liger-Belair, Gérard (2004). Uncorked: The Science of Champagne. Princeton, N.J.: Princeton University Press. ISBN 9780691119199.
- Ray, Cyril (1969). In a Glass Lightly. A. S. Barnes. ISBN 978-0-498-07459-2.
- Robards, Terry (1984). Terry Robards' New Book of Wine: The Ultimate Guide to Wines Throughout the World. New York: G.P. Putnam's Sons. ISBN 9780399129094.
- Sezgin, Pam (2010). "Drinking Glasses and Vessels". In Black, Rachel (ed.). Alcohol in Popular Culture: An Encyclopedia. Santa Barbara, California: Greenwood Press. ISBN 9780313380488.
- Villa, Keith (2012). "Framboise". In Oliver, Garrett (ed.). The Oxford Companion to Beer. New York: Oxford University Press. ISBN 9780195367133.
- Walden, Hilaire (2001). The Book of Cocktails. Volume 2. New York: HP Books. ISBN 9781557883728.
