= List of glassware =

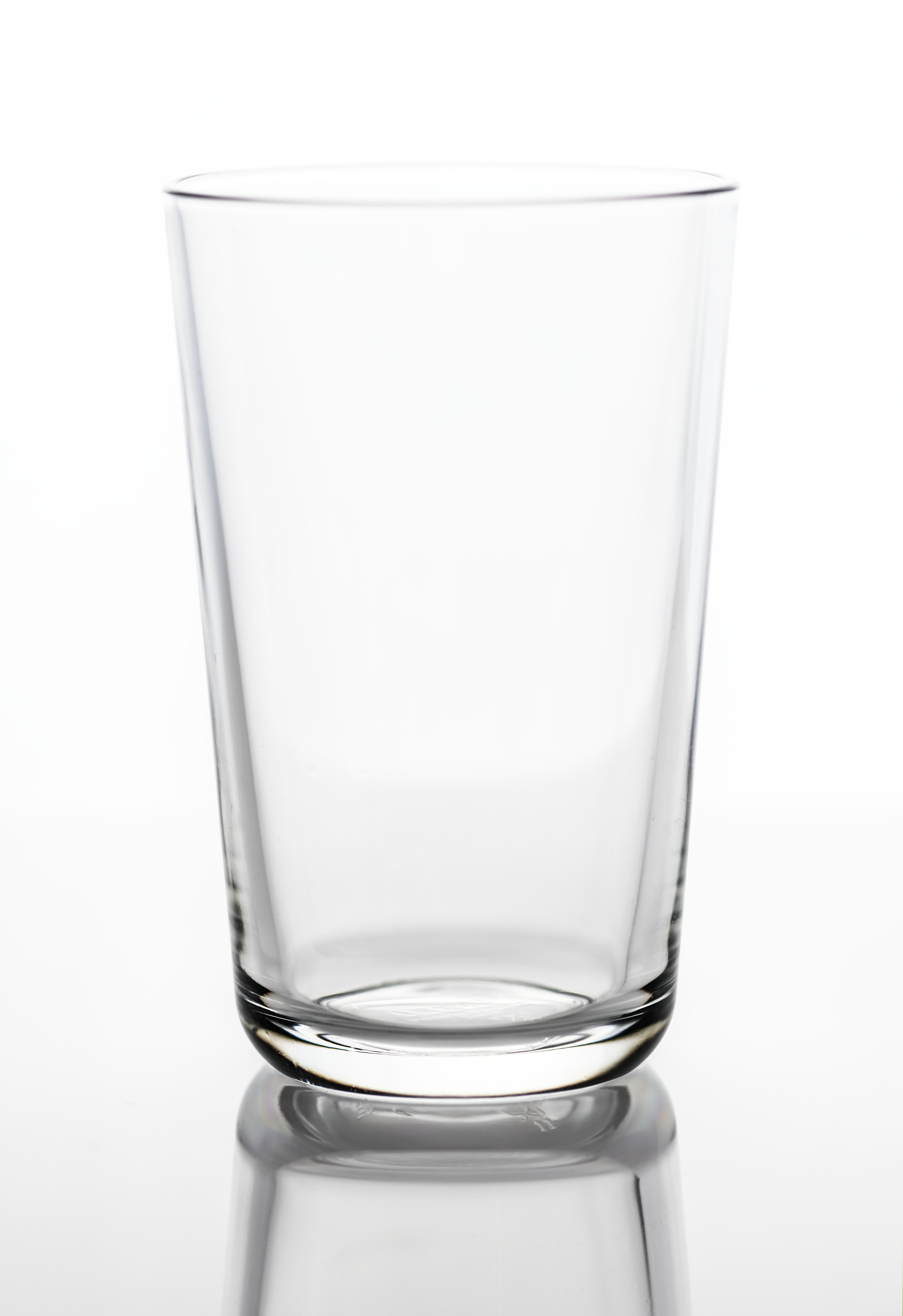
Typical drinkware

This list of glassware includes drinking vessels (drinkware), tableware used to set a table for eating a meal and generally glass items such as vases, and glasses used in the catering industry. It does not include laboratory glassware.

== Drinkware ==
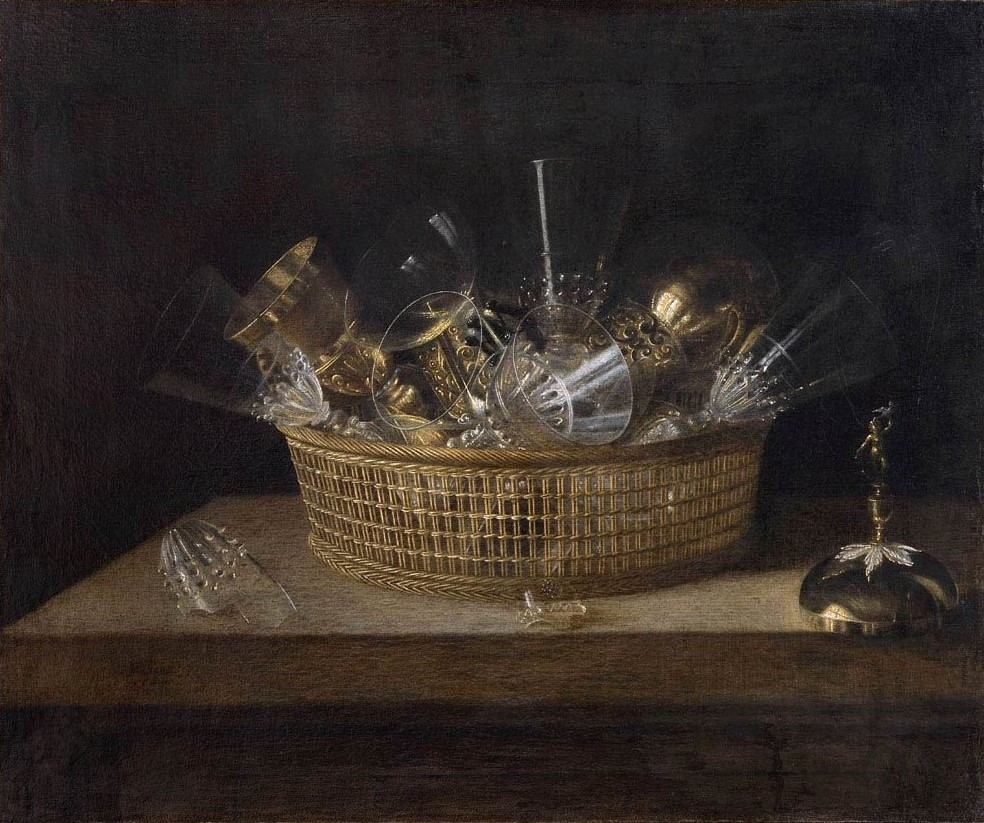
Sebastian Stoskopff: Glasses in a Basket (1644; Musée de l'Œuvre Notre-Dame, Strasbourg)

Drinkware, beverageware (in other words, cups, jugs and ewers) is a general term for a vessel intended to contain beverages or liquid foods for drinking or consumption.

- Beer glassware
- Bottle
- Coffee cup
- Cup
- Dwarf ale glass
- Heavy baluster glass
- Jar
- Mazagran
- Mug
- Pythagorean cup
- Quaich
- Sake cup (ochoko)
- Stemware
- Tazza
- Teacup
- Tiki mug
- Trembleuse
- Tumbler
- Vitrolero

The word cup comes from Middle English cuppe, from Old English, from Late Latin cuppa, drinking vessel, perhaps variant of Latin cupa, tub, cask. The first known use of the word cup is before the 12th century.

== Tumblers ==
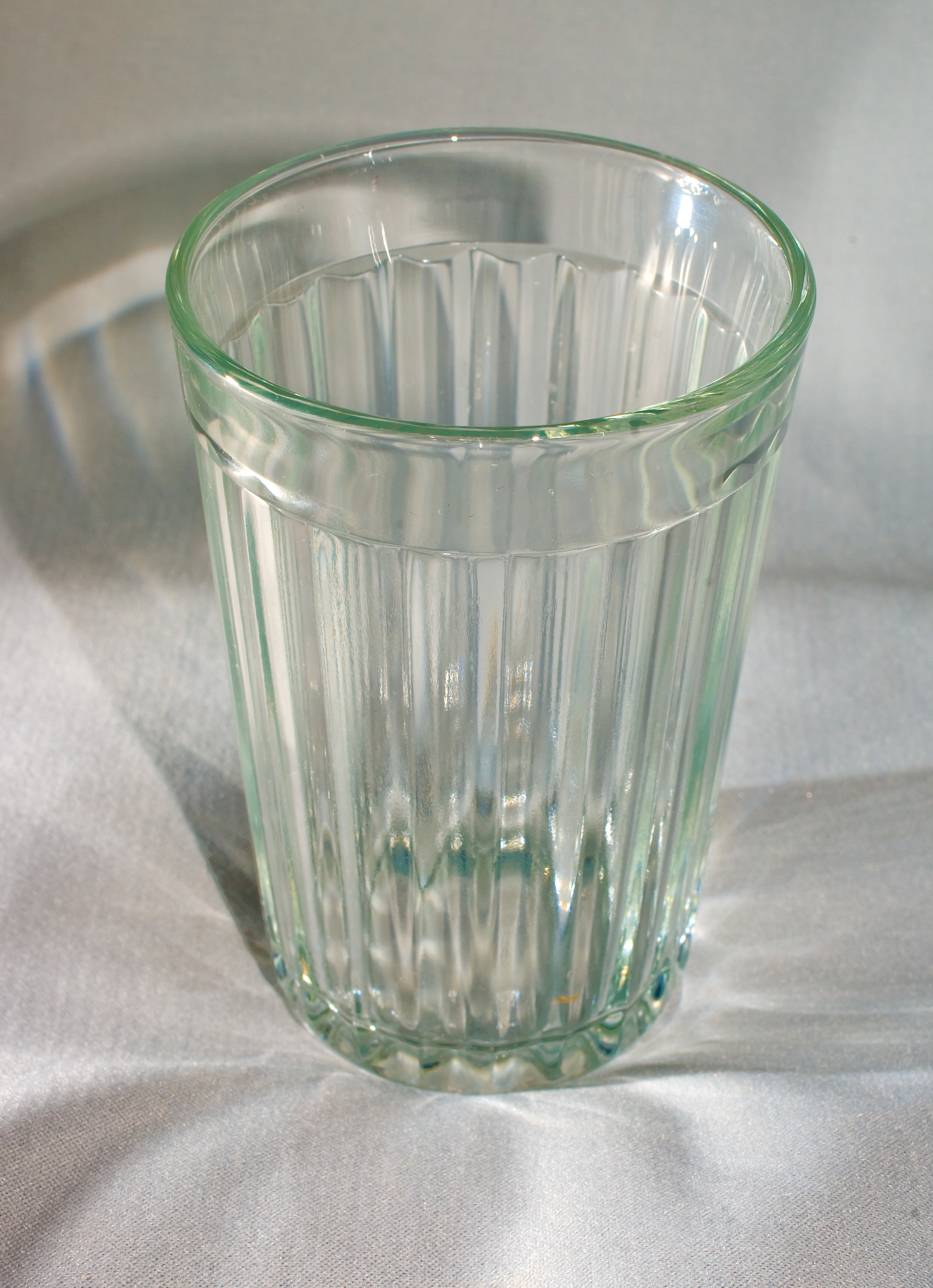
A classic 20-facet Soviet table-glass, produced in the city of Gus-Khrustalny since 1943

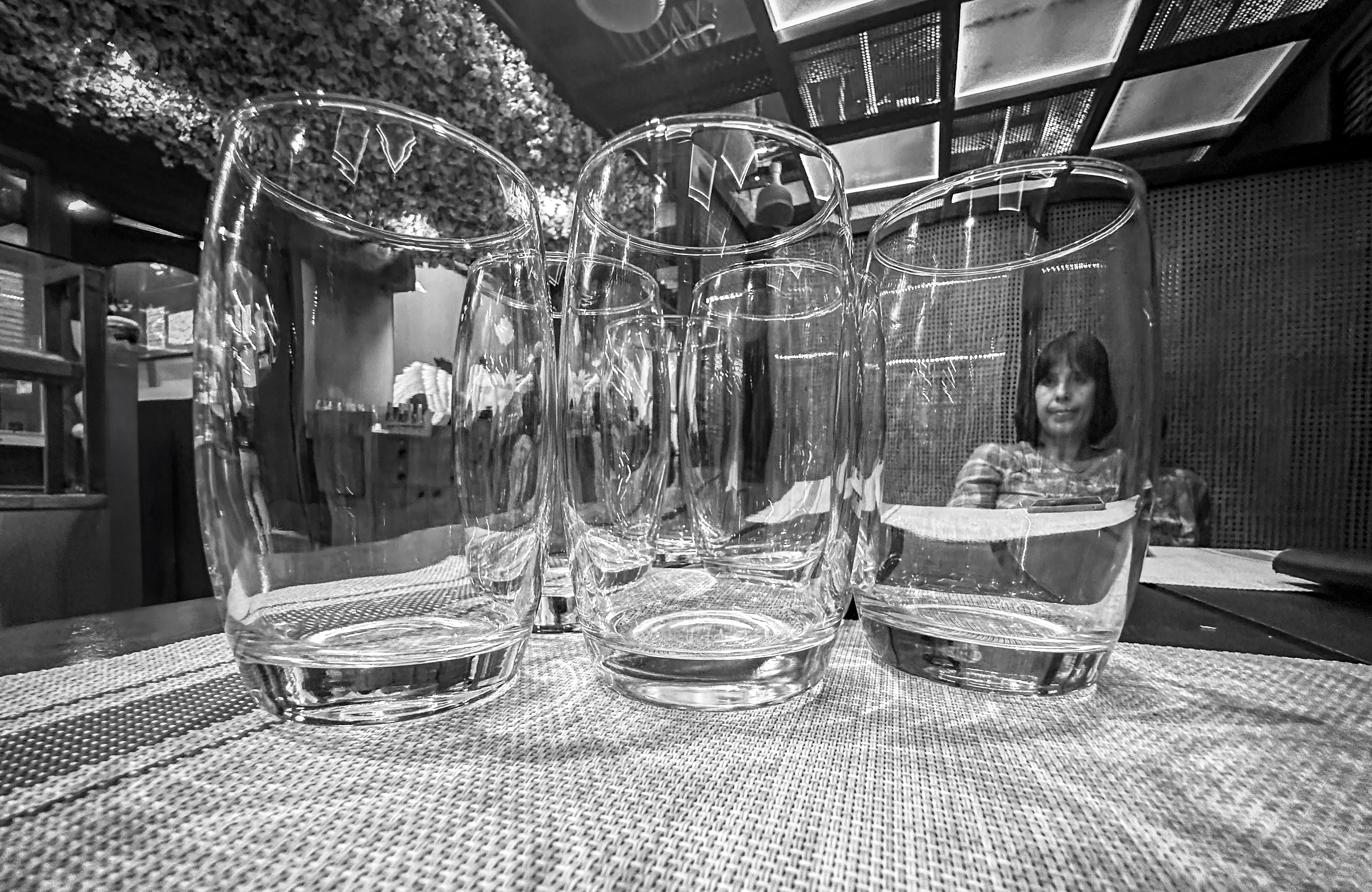
Rounded Tumblers

Tumblers are flat-bottomed drinking glasses.

- Collins glass, for a tall mixed drink.
- Dizzy cocktail glass, a glass with a wide, shallow bowl, comparable to a normal cocktail glass but without the stem
- Faceted glass or granyonyi stakan
- Highball glass, for mixed drinks
- Iced tea glass
- Juice glass, for fruit juices and vegetable juices
- Old fashioned glass, traditionally, for a simple cocktail or liquor "on the rocks" or "neat". Contemporary American "rocks" glasses may be much larger, and used for a variety of beverages over ice.
- Shot glass, a small glass for up to four ounces of liquor. The modern shot glass has a thicker base and sides than the older whiskey glass.
- Water glass
- Whiskey tumbler, a small, thin-walled glass for a straight shot of liquor

== Beer glassware ==
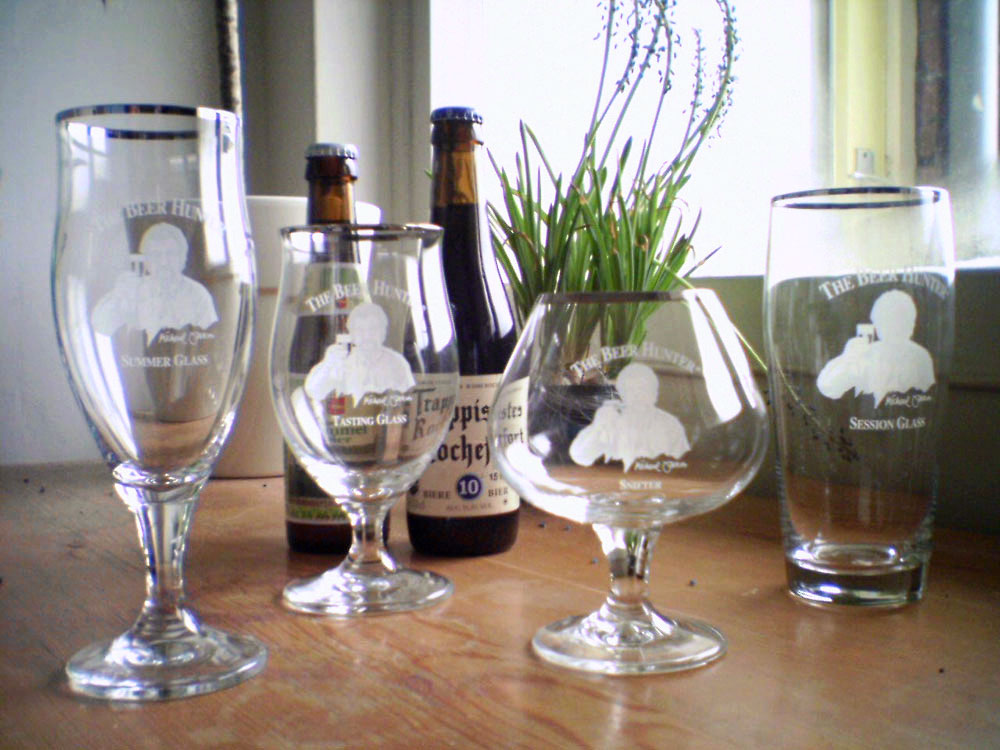
Beer glassware. Left to right: Pilstulpe, tulip glass, snifter, Willi Becher.

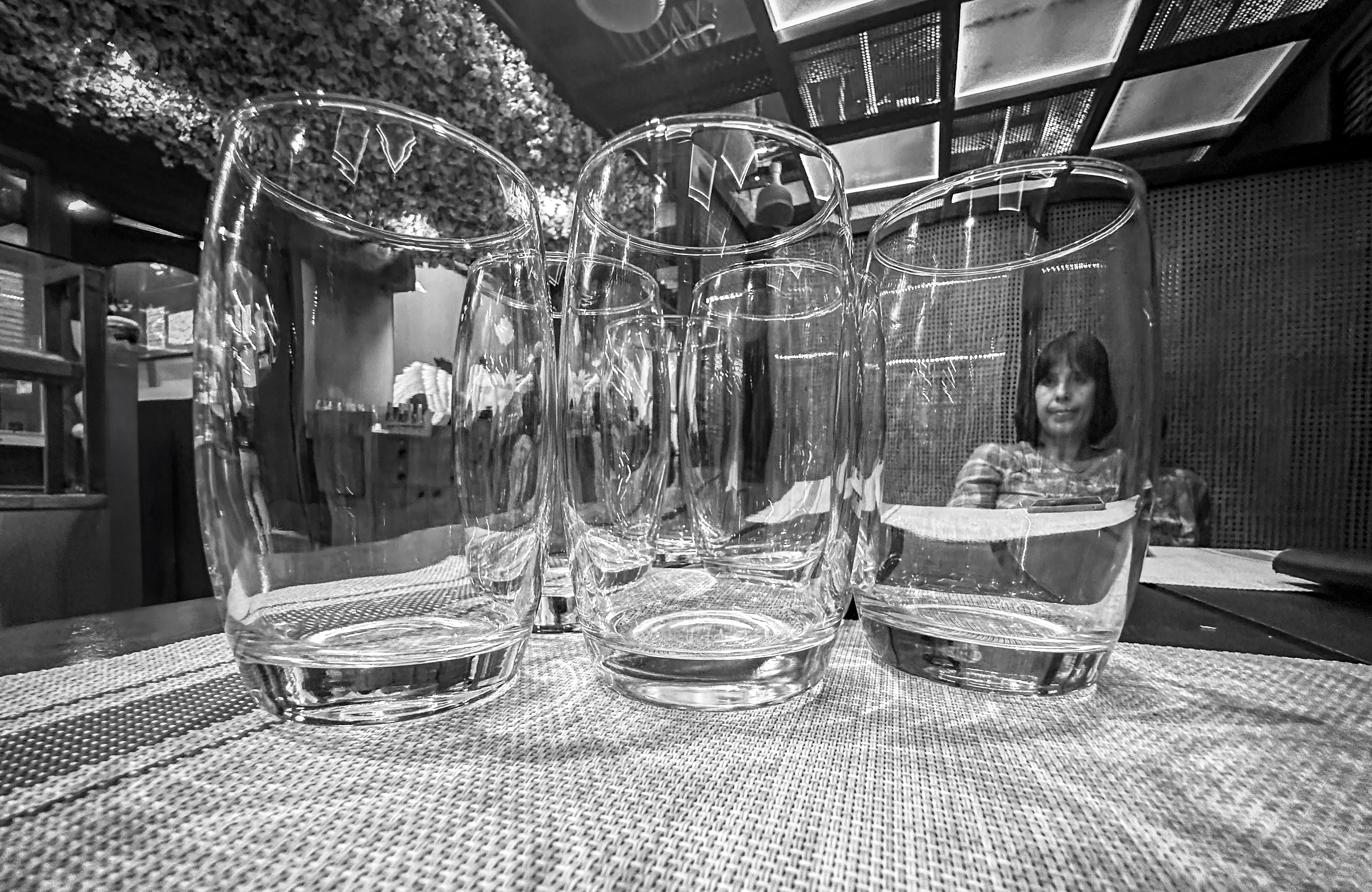
Rounded Tumblers

- Beer boot
- Beer bottle
- Beer stein, large mug traditionally with a hinged lid
- Berkemeyer
- Glass, 200ml (7 fl. oz.) Australian beer glass (Queensland and Victoria)
- Handle, 425ml New Zealand beer glass
- Jug, 750–1000ml served at pubs in New Zealand
- Middy, 285ml (10 fl. oz.) Australian beer glass (New South Wales)
- Pilsner glass, for pale lager
- Pint glass, for an imperial pint of beer or cider
- Pony glass, for a 140ml of beer, a "short" or "small" beer
- Pot glass
- Pot, 285ml (10 fl. oz.) Australian beer glass (Queensland and Victoria)
- Schooner, 425ml (15 fl. oz.) Australian beer glass, 285 ml (10 fl. oz.) in South Australia
- Tankard, a large drinking cup, usually with a handle and a hinged cover
- Wheat beer glass, for wheat beer
- Yard glass, a very tall, conical beer glass, with a round ball base, usually hung on a wall when empty

== Stemware ==
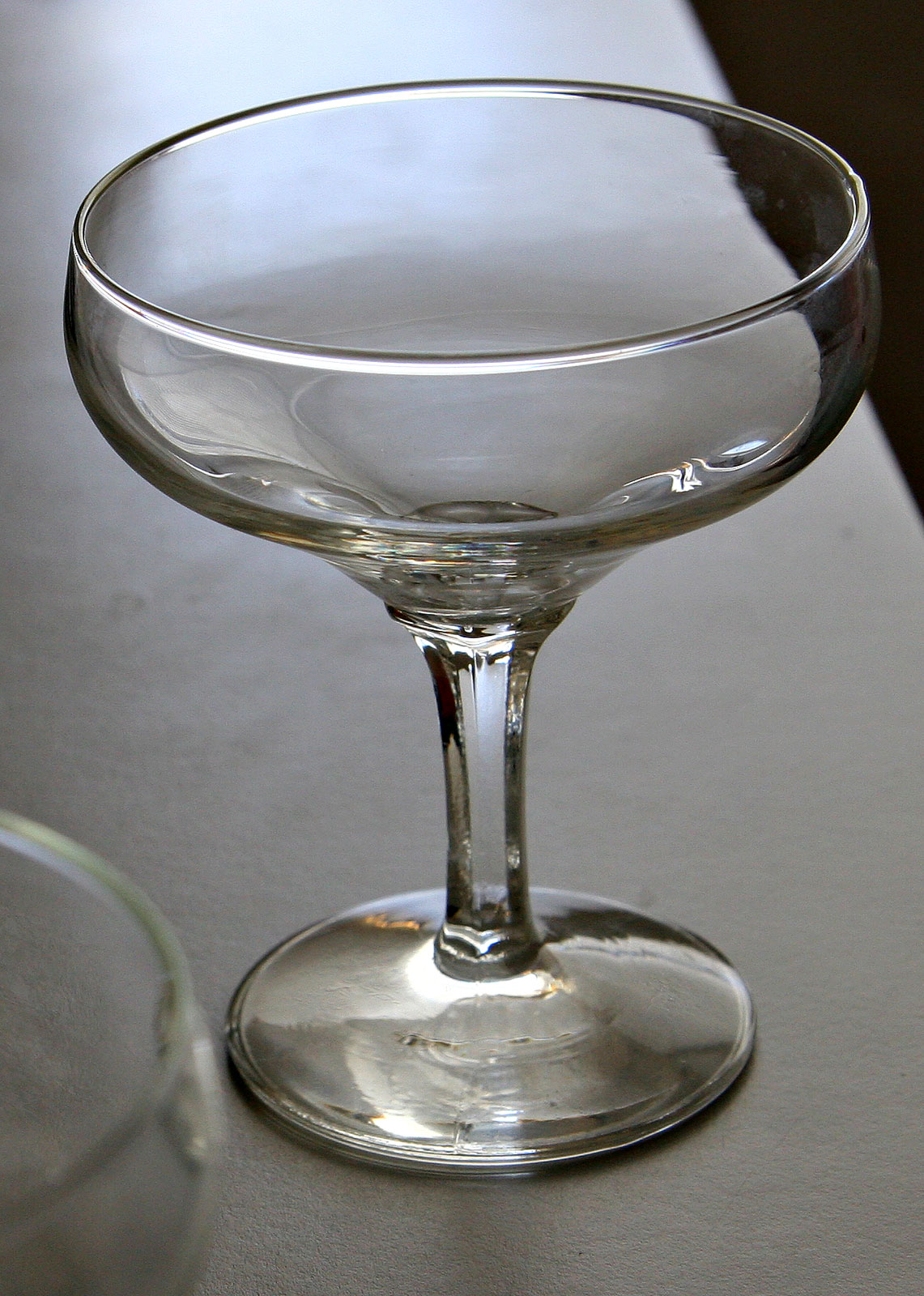
A champagne coupe

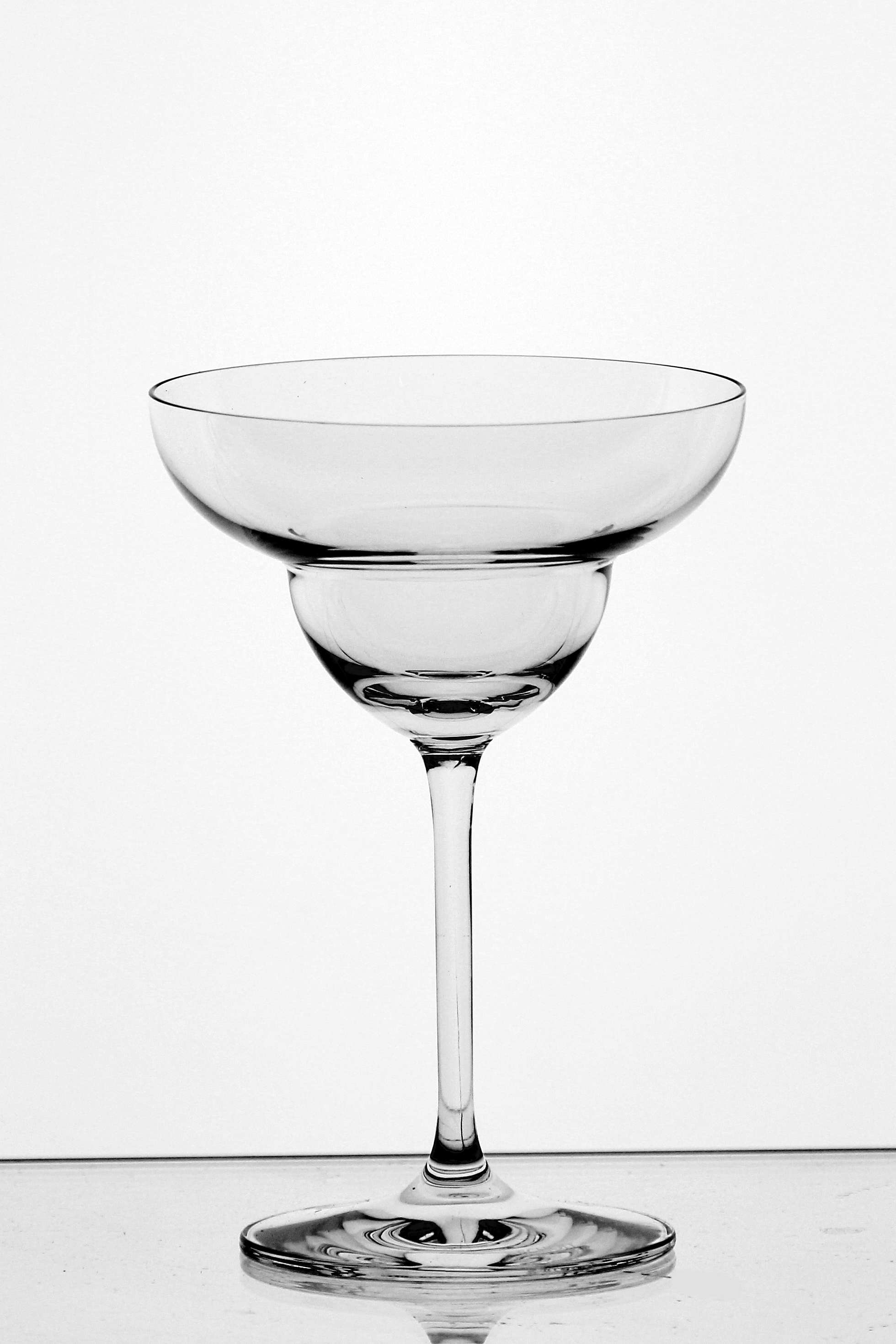
A margarita glass

- Absinthe glass, a short, thick-stemmed glass with a tall, wide bowl and some feature (like a ridge, bead, or bulge) indicating a correct serving of absinthe
- Chalice or goblet, an ornate stem glass, especially one for ceremonial purposes
- Champagne coupe, a stem glass with a wide, shallow bowl, for champagne (similar to a cocktail glass)
- Champagne flute, a stem glass with a tall, narrow bowl, for champagne
- Cocktail glass, a stem glass with a wide, shallow bowl, for cocktails
- Fountain glass, a tall fluted stem glass common in soda fountains, family restaurants and 24-hour diner-style restaurants for milkshakes and ice cream sodas
- Glencairn whisky glass, a wide bowl with a narrow mouth, similar to a snifter's, but with a shorter, sturdier base, designed for whisky
- Hurricane glass (poco grande glass)
- Margarita glass (variant of champagne coupe)
- Nick & Nora
- Rummer
- Sherbet, a stem glass for ice cream or sorbet
- Sherry glass
- Snifter, a liquor glass with a short stem and a wide bowl that narrows at the top, for brandy and liquor
- Wine glass, a stem glass

== Other ==
- Art glass, glassware that is modern art
- Pitcher, a container, usually with a spout for pouring its contents
- Punch bowl, a bowl that punch is put in, generally used in parties
- Vase, an open container often used to hold flowers
- Bong, a smoking device often made from glass
- Drug pipe, a form of drug paraphernalia often made from glass
- Peking glass, a Chinese form of overlay glass, often in the form of snuff boxes or vases
- Penny lick
- Nappy, a shallow open serving dish with no rim and a flat bottom; in most instances, a small bowl, with or without one or two handles.

== See also ==
- Beverage coaster, a flat ceramic or wood piece that protects tables' surfaces
- Bottle (List of bottle types, brands and companies)
- Chip work, a form of engraved glassware
