= Eighteenth-century English drinking glasses =

18th-Century hand-blown glassware produced in England

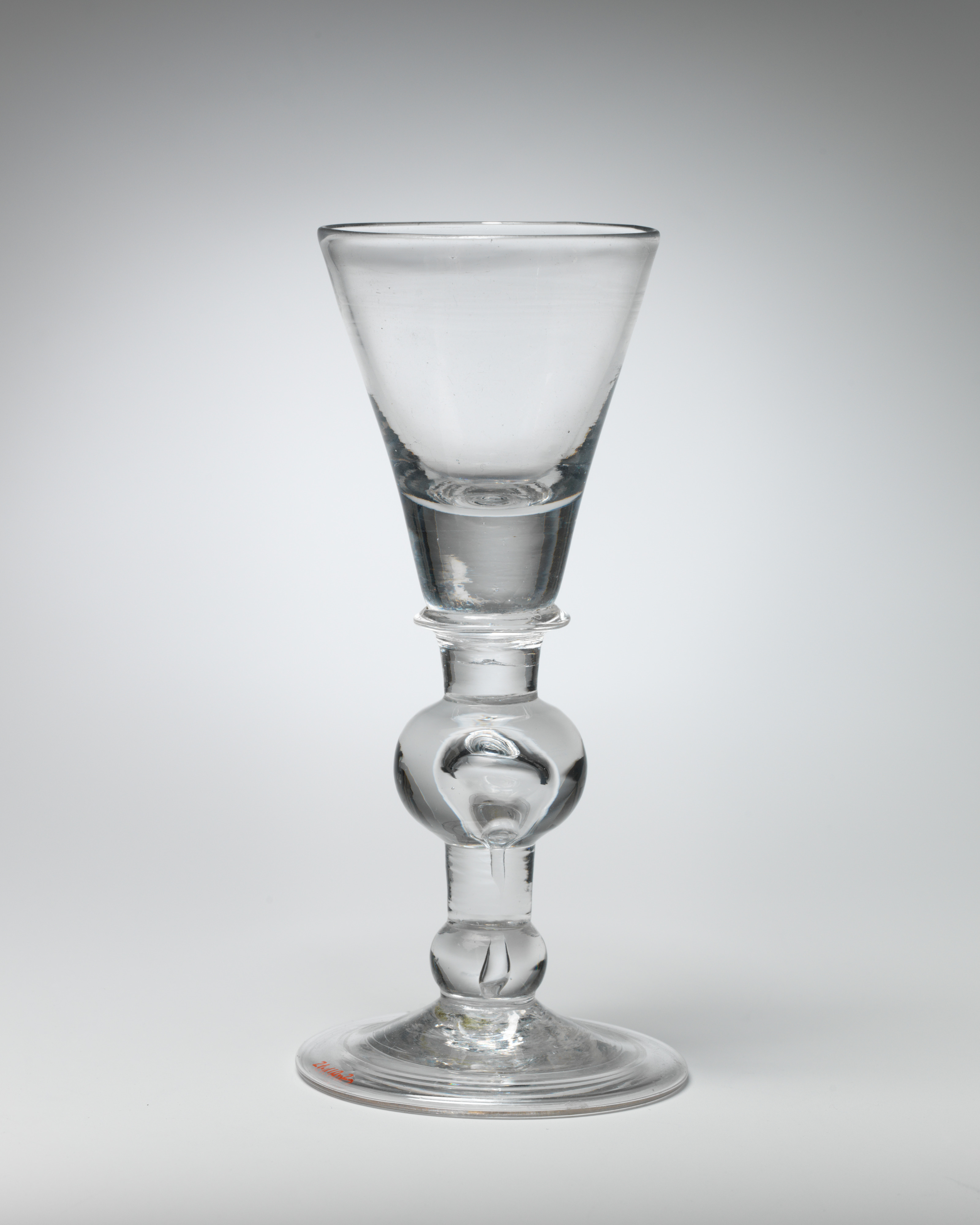
English Heavy Baluster Wine Glass (c. 1710)

Eighteenth-century English drinking glasses are a category of hand-blown glassware produced in England between approximately 1700 and 1800, reflecting significant developments in glassmaking technology, design, and social drinking culture. They include glasses for wine, ale, cordials, ratafia, gin, as well as edible items, such as jelly, syllabub and sweet meats. Decanters, tazzas, and other items are usually discussed within this context.

== Introduction ==
During the eighteenth century, English glasshouses benefited from innovations in lead glass production, often attributed to George Ravenscroft in the late seventeenth century. The widespread use of lead oxide in the English glasshouses resulted in a distinct and striking form of glass (façon d'Angleterre), which is still admired to the present day.

Drinking glasses from this period are notable for their stylistic diversity and craftsmanship. Common features include folded feet, drawn stems, and decorative inclusions such as air bubbles or enamel. The glasses also reflect broader social practices, including the rise of tavern culture, toasting rituals, and the consumption of beer, wine, and spirits across different social classes. Today, eighteenth-century English drinking glasses are studied by historians and collected for their artistic, cultural, and technological significance.

== Classification ==
Scholars have devised ways of classifying drinking glasses based on the bowl, stem and foot. However, classification based on the stem has allowed for a comprehensive chronology to be established. Glasses with short or vestigial stems, such as jelly, dram, and dwarf ale glasses, span the whole of the 18th-century.

=== Heavy Balusters and Balusters (c. 1685–1725) ===
Heavy Balusters are some of the earliest English lead-crystal glasses. They are characterised by heavily knopped stems, and usually have funnel or bell bowls. The foot is typically conical or domed, and is nearly always folded. Philippe Mercier's Sir Thomas Samwell and Friends (c. 1733) shows a collection of Heavy Balusters of various sizes.

=== Light Balusters or Balustroids (c. 1710–1760) ===
Stems have subtle knops and are lighter in form than the preceding heavy balusters. In Glass through the ages, E. Barrington Haynes says the following about Balustroid glasses:

Of all our eighteenth-century stem types the Balustroid glasses displayed the greatest divergence in character. At first doubtfully distinguishable from the latest Balusters, they gradually deteriorated in style and somewhat in manufacture as their market widened to include more and more people of less and less wealth.

Contemporaneous depictions of light balusters in 18th-century works of art are extant. For example, the series of "Kit-cat" club portraits by Sir Godfrey Kneller shows Thomas Pelham-Holles, 1st Duke of Newcastle-under-Lyne and Henry Clinton, 7th Earl of Lincoln holding what are now known as "Kit-cat"-type balustroids.

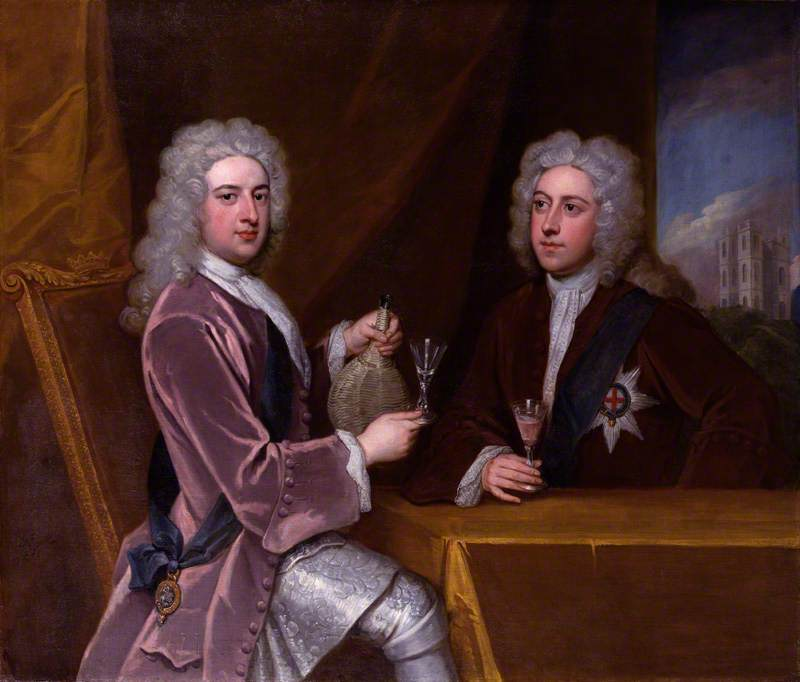
Thomas Pelham-Holles, 1st Duke of Newcastle-under-Lyne; Henry Clinton, 7th Earl of Lincoln by Sir Godfrey Kneller (c. 1721).

Another notable example can be seen in The Pot-Boy (British School, c. 1720), which is housed at the Bristol Museum & Art Gallery.

=== Moulded Pedestal Stems (c. 1715–1765) ===
Also called Silesian stems. These have a four, six or eight sided 'pedestal' stems which usually sit on a folded conical foot. In The Golden Age of English Glass 1650-1775, Dwight Lanmon says the following:

It was once speculated that four-sided stems preceded those with six or eight sides, but there is evidence that all of the stem types were made concurrently in England.

=== Plain and Hollow Stems (c. 1730–1775) ===
Simple forms and spanning a large period of manufacture. These also include stems with drawn air tears within the stem.

=== Air Twist Stems (c. 1745–1770) ===
A distinctly English form which incorporates spirals of air within the stem. Contemporaneous advertisements show that they were known as 'wormed glass' due to the spiralling columns of trapped air through the stem.

=== Incised Twist Stems (c. 1745–1765) ===
Rare stems with helical grooves lightly cut into the surface of a plain stem, giving the appearance of air twist stems from a distance.

=== Composite Stems (c. 1745–1775) ===
Stems combining two or more techniques, such as knops with air or opaque twists.

=== Opaque Twist Stems (c. 1755–1780) ===
Opaque twist glasses, also known as cotton twists, have enamel running through their stems and come in many different variations. They are descended from Venetian latticinio glass, which was popular in the 16th-century. The enamel is usually white, but coloured variants exist. In August 1768, Sylas Neville wrote in his diary:

After dinner saw the different operations in making a wine-glass and beer ditto and putting the white in the stem; the workmen gave us a specimen of the white metal.

This is a first-hand account of a person witnessing the manufacture of opaque twist glasses in Bristol during the 18th-century.

=== Faceted Stems (c. 1780–1825) ===
Stems cut with multiple flat or spiral facets. These stems are particularly striking by candlelight.

== Enamelled Glass ==
Enamelled glass (not to be confused with enamel in the context of opaque twist glasses) is type of decoration which produces robust and attractive motifs to the surface of glasses, goblets, decanters, and other valuable objects. The decorative effect is produced by first painting the glass surface with powdered glass mixed with a binder. The object is then fired in order to fuse the applied power to the glass surface. This produces long-lasting colours, which can be translucent or opaque.

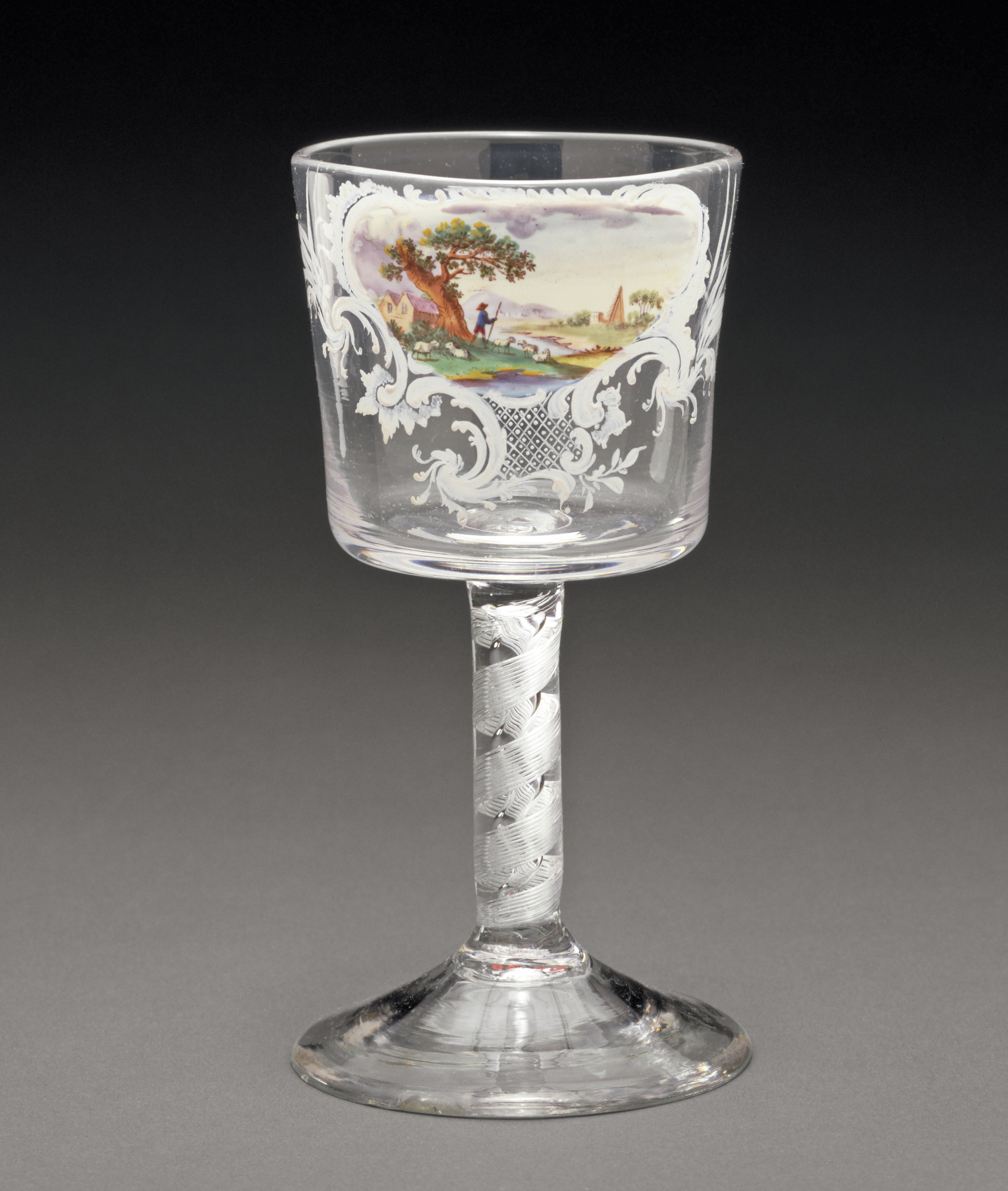
English opaque twist goblet, decorated with enamel in the Beilby workshop (c. 1770).

Enamelled glass in the English context is synonymous with the Beilby family in the second half of the 18th-century. In their family workshop they produced beautifully decorated objects for the aristocracy and royalty, both domestically and abroad. Other enamellers were also working in England at this time.

== See also ==
- Heavy baluster glass
- Dwarf ale glass
- William Beilby and Mary Beilby
