= Beilby =

Beilby is a given name and surname. Notable people with the name include:

== Given name ==
- Sir Beilby Alston (1868–1929), British diplomat
- Beilby Lawley, 2nd Baron Wenlock (1818–1880), British soldier and politician
- Beilby Lawley, 3rd Baron Wenlock (1849–1912), British soldier, politician, Governor of Madras
- Beilby Porteus or Porteous (1731–1809), successively Bishop of Chester and of London, an Anglican reformer
- Beilby Thompson (1742–1799), British landowner and politician

== Surname ==
- George Thomas Beilby (1850–1924), British chemist
  - The Beilby Medal and Prize, named after him
- Marcus Beilby (born 1951), Australian artist, realist painter and winner of 1987 Sulman Prize
- Ralph Beilby (1744–1817), English engraver working chiefly on silver and copper
- William Beilby (1740–1819), British glassworker who produced enamelled glass
- William Beilby (physician) (1783–1849), English-Scottish philanthropic physician
