= Mary Beilby =

Glass artist

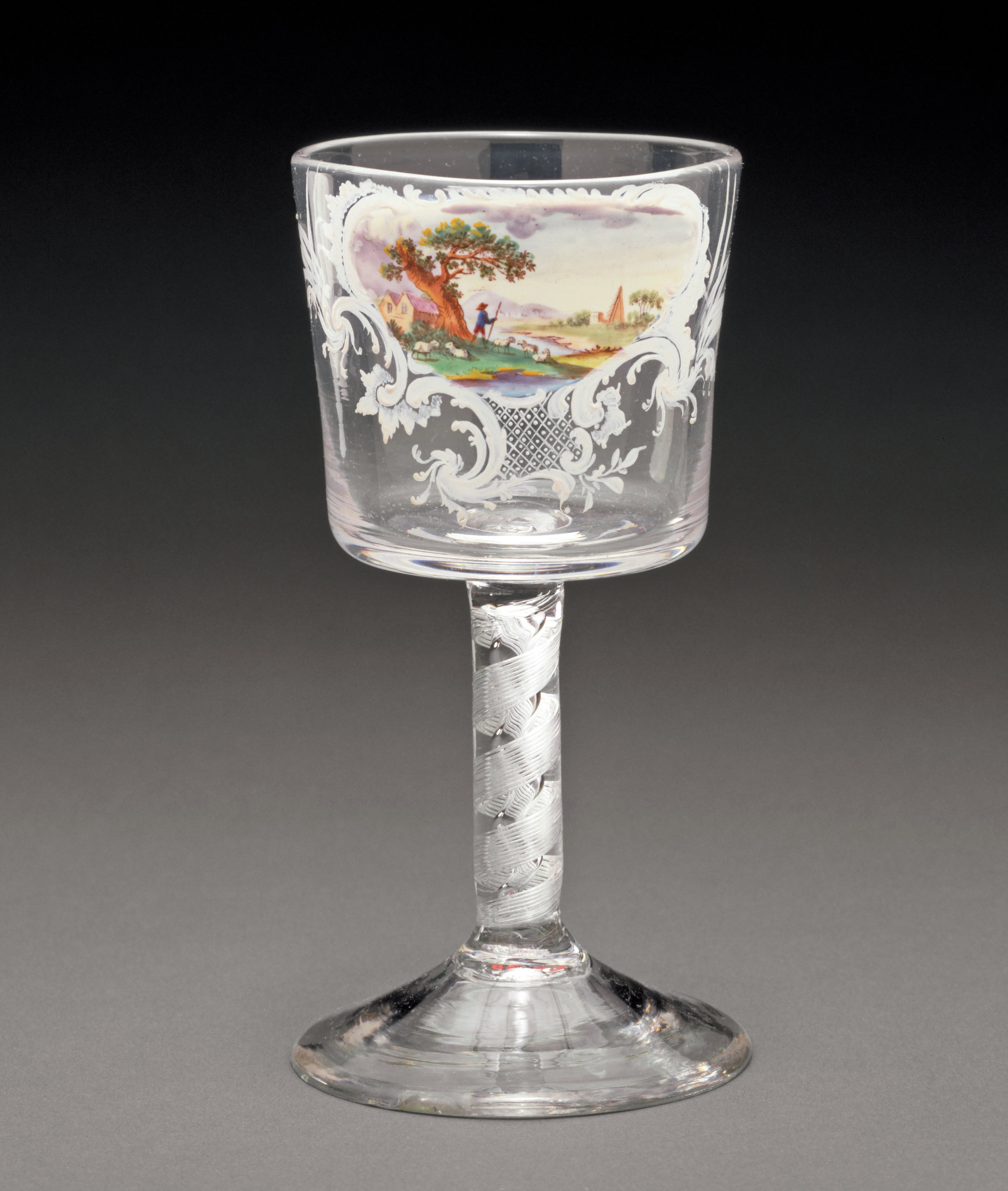
A goblet with a painted landscape scene associated with Mary Beilby, c. 1770.

Mary Beilby (c. 1750 – 1797) was an enameller and glass-painter in the Beilby glassware family.

She was baptised in Durham in 1750, the youngest child of William Beilby senior, a silversmith, and his wife Mary Bainbridge, a schoolteacher. Her six siblings included William, Ralph, and Thomas. By 1760, the family had moved to Gateshead, where Ralph set up Beilby & Co., using William's expertise from his apprenticeship as an enameller.

Mary joined the family business at a young age: when Thomas Bewick joined the Beilby workshop as an apprentice in 1776, he reported that William "taught his brother Thomas and sister Mary enamelling and painting; and, in this way, this most respectable and industrious family lived together and maintained themselves." They would purchase glass vessels and paint them in their home, which Bewick said was Mary and Thomas's "constant employment". Bewick's memoir reports a secret attachment to Mary, which he felt he could not act on due to her family's contemptuous treatment of him.

In 1774, Bewick records that "Miss Beilby had a paralytic stroke, which very greatly altered her look, and rendered her for some time unhappy." Sometime after 1788, she moved to Fife to join William and his wife there. She died in 1797.

Beilby ware involves fine enamelled designs on glass including rococo flourishes, landscape vignettes, and heraldic designs. Although Mary's contribution is acknowledged, it is difficult to identify exactly which pieces she decorated.
