= George Ravenscroft =

English businessman (1632–1683)

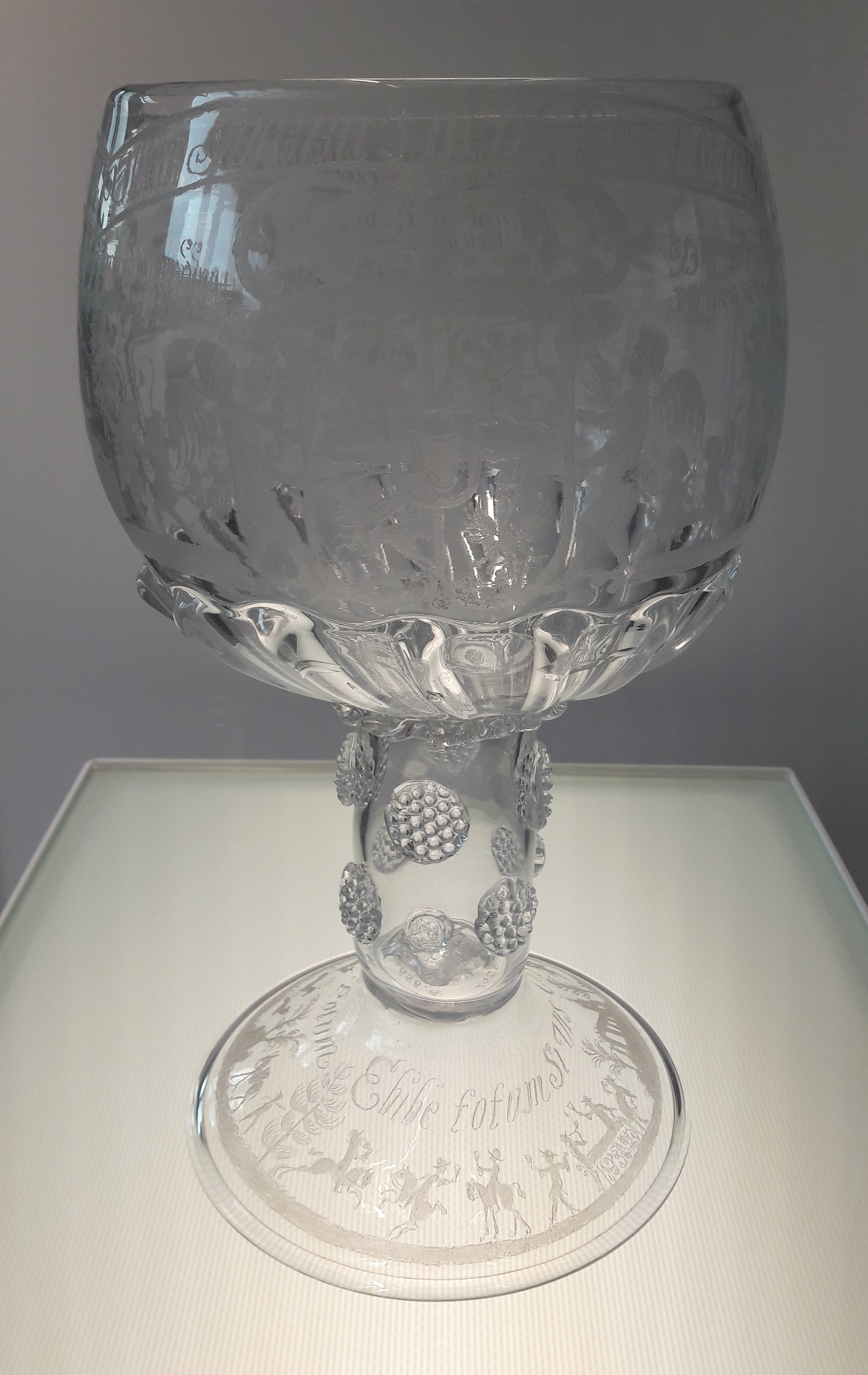
Rummer with coat of arms of John III Sobieski and the City of Gdańsk by George Ravenscroft's glassworks, engraved by Willem Mooleyser, 1677–1678, National Museum in Warsaw

George Ravenscroft (1632 – 7 June 1683) was an English businessman in the import/export and glass making trades. He is primarily known for his work in developing clear lead crystal glass (also known as flint glass) in England.

== Personal life ==
Little is known about Ravenscroft's personal life, character or appearance, though his father described him in his will as a responsible family man and an astute businessman. He was born in 1632, the second of five sons of Roman Catholic parents who hid their true faith and lived outwardly as Anglicans, and he was baptized in Alconbury Weston, Huntingdonshire, England, in April 1633. From 1643 to 1651 Ravenscroft attended the English College in Douai, France to train for the priesthood, but he dropped out before finishing his training and returned to London by 1666.

After settling in London and establishing a successful import/export business that made him wealthy, Ravenscroft married Hellen Appleby, from Yorkshire, England, in 1670 or 1671 and had three children with her. In 1684 his widow subsequently married Sir Thomas Sheridan, Chief Secretary of State for Ireland (1687-1688). Ravenscroft died on 7 June 1683 after suffering from "a palsy" and was buried in the Ravenscroft vault in the Church of St. John the Baptist in Chipping Barnet, North London, England. Today in Chipping Barnet a school, a park, a garden, and a road are called Ravenscroft, suggesting the importance of the Ravenscroft family in the area at one time.

== Early career (1651–1666) ==
Ravenscroft's whereabouts and activities between 1651 and 1666 are unclear, though it is certain that he lived in Venice, Italy for at least some of this time working as a merchant and possibly learning glassmaking techniques that he would later bring back to England. At some point he established a successful import/export business in Venice with two of his brothers, Francis and James.

== Later career (1666–1683) ==
=== Background ===
Ravenscroft moved to London by 1666 and continued working in the import/export business, trading goods such as currants, glass, and lace. There are differing accounts of Ravenscroft's role in the invention and subsequent development of lead crystal glass. This much is generally accepted to be true: During the years Ravenscroft lived in Venice (sometime between 1651 and 1666) he was involved in the glass trade, not as a craftsman but as a merchant, so he knew and associated with glassmakers in Italy. By the time Ravenscroft moved back to England several glassmakers there had already started manufacturing glassware that attempted to mimic Italian cristallo, and Ravenscroft decided to start his own glass-making business while still running his import/export business.

It is likely that Ravenscroft was the director and financier of his glassworks but not actively involved in the physical process of glass-making, a role likely to have been performed by one or more craftsmen in his employ, such as Italians Signor da Costa or Vincenzo Pompeio, or his English assistant Hawley Bishopp, who set up his own glassworks, in the Savoy area of London, after Ravenscroft's death. Ravenscroft's glassworks produced mainly drinking glasses but also made some bowls and posset pots.

At this point the circumstances concerning Ravenscroft's role in lead crystal manufacture becomes less clear. This is partly because records from the mid-17th century are incomplete, but is also largely because Ravenscroft was secretive about his ingredients and processes. There is proof that he was helped by Sir Robert Plot FRS, who suggested using flints from Oxfordshire river beds in place of dark grey London flints to the very expensive white flints from the river bed of the River Po in Italy as used in Murano. It is now believed that Dr Plot requested a sample of his powder which was described as being "fine and white". If he added lead oxide (in a red lead powder form), the powder would appear pale pink, so he may have deliberately have misled Dr Plot and his assistant sent to visit in Henley on Thames. He was probably careful to prevent competitors from copying him and also wished to agree a deal with the Worshipful Company of Glass Sellers of London Glass Sellers' Company, to which he gave exclusive rights to buy his creations at pre-determined prices in return for a grant to finance his Henley-on-Thames workshop, with two teams of glass blowers.

There is some debate over how, when, and why Ravenscroft was inspired to use lead in the production of glass. Some believe that he accidentally discovered that adding lead oxides to the glass mixture lent the final product special qualities, while others believe that he learned the technique in Venice. The use of lead in glass was known in Italy as proved by 12% lead being discovered in the white cameo layer of The Portland Vase, a famous Roman artefact in the British Museum Others point out that the process was documented in an Italian book, L'Arte Vetraria, written by Antonio Neri in 1612 was translated into English by Christopher Merret in 1662.

Whatever the origin of the idea, Ravenscroft believed that he had a unique product to offer the English market, so he applied to King Charles II for a patent in 1674 to establish his right to be sole manufacturer of lead crystal glass in England. He produced lead crystal glass for a period of only five years, dissolving his manufacturing business in 1679. His patent expired in 1681.

In 1680 he became associated with the Vauxhall glassworks, working with the company until his death in 1683.

=== Ravenscroft’s Lead Crystal Glass ===
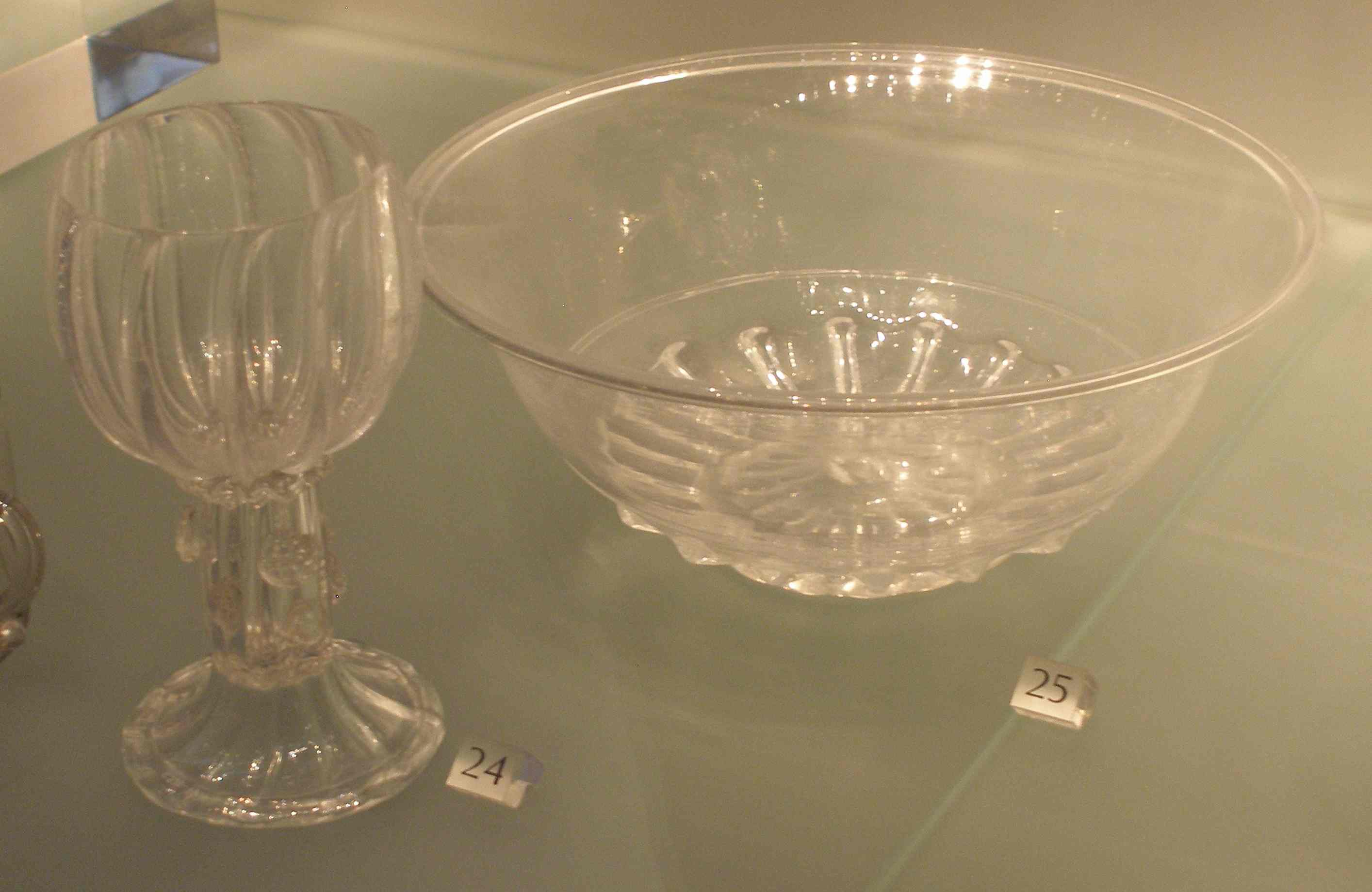
Examples of Ravenscroft's Glass in the V&A

Ravenscroft's glass works were set up in two locations, the primary facility being established in Savoy, London in 1673 and a secondary, temporary facility set up between 1674 and 1675 in Henley-on-Thames.

Early Ravenscroft glass (1674–1676) typically suffered from crizzling (gradual, unstoppable deterioration characterized by numerous cracks, making the glass look cloudy), within one to two years, because of impurities in the glass-making mixture - excessive alkaline salts or insufficient amounts of lime, which acts as a stabilizer, have been suggested as possible causes. No early pieces are known to still exist.

The "crizzling" damaged the reputation of the company, and Ravenscroft and his team worked to fix the problem. Ravenscroft announced in 1676 that the "crizzling" problem had been resolved and that the new, improved glass vessels would bear a raven's head seal to distinguish them from earlier, faulty pieces. A small number (less than twenty) of glass vessels bearing the raven's head seal exist today, some of which have crizzled and some of which have not.

More pieces created by Ravenscroft may exist, but in the absence of the raven's head seal, which he stopped using in about 1677, or any descriptions or drawings of his designs, it is difficult to positively attribute particular pieces to him. Some pieces thought to strongly resemble Ravenscroft's work bear an "S" seal; some have suggested that the "S" stands for "Savoy", Ravenscroft's main production facility, while others tentatively suggest that the "S" might stand for "Southwark, indicating that the glass may conceivably have been made by John Bowles and William Lillington at their South London glass works across the river. There may be around forty glass items made by Ravenscroft using his new lead recipe, but less than twenty with the raven's seal.

The addition of lead oxide to the raw ingredients of glass resulted in a melted mixture that had a lower viscosity than ordinary glass, which had the advantage of being less likely to contain air bubbles. This made it easier to blow giving it a "working time" of about two minutes without re-heating, and made it particularly suitable for blowing into moulds. Lead glass has a higher refractive index, making its appearance sparkling, bright, and brilliant in light. It "rings" when struck.

== Legacy ==
It is not known why Ravenscroft decided to sever his ties with the London Glass Sellers' Company and leave the glass-making business in 1679 (his strong Roman Catholic beliefs might have made him unpopular), but his style of lead crystal glass became fashionable in England and within 20 years of his patent some 100 glass makers in England were producing lead crystal glass. Ravenscroft did not "invent" lead crystal glass, as others had already discovered the advantages of adding lead oxide to glass, but he did improve the process. More than a dozen of Ravenscroft's pieces are known to exist (see table below), and the "robust simplicity" of his designs is still admired.

Known Ravenscroft Glass Vessels Bearing the Raven's Head Seal
Description	Date of Manufacture	Location	Condition
Bowl	1676–1677	Victoria & Albert Museum, London, UK	crizzled
Bowl with stand	1676–1677	Fitzwilliam Museum, Cambridge, UK	crizzled
Roemer	1676–1677	Victoria & Albert Museum, London, UK	crizzled
Roemer	1676–1677	Corning Museum of Glass, Corning, NY, USA	crizzled
Roemer	1677–1678	Muzeum Narodowe, Warsaw, Poland	not crizzled
Bottle	1676–1677	British Museum, London, UK	slightly crizzled
Jug	1676–1677	Higgins Museum, Bedford, UK	crizzled
Tankard	1676–1677	Victoria & Albert Museum, London, UK	crizzled
Posset pot	Unknown	Toledo Museum of Art, Toledo, OH, USA	not crizzled
Posset pot	1677–1678	Fitzwilliam Museum, Cambridge, UK	not known
data in table above taken from and

== See also ==
- Glass
- Lead glass
- Crystal glass
- Glass production
- Heavy baluster glass
