= Vauxhall glassworks =

Coordinates: 51°29.36′N 0°07.33′W

Vauxhall glassworks was a plate glass factory off what is now the Albert Embankment in the Vauxhall area of Lambeth, London, just to the north of Vauxhall Gardens. The site is now commemorated in the name of Glasshouse Walk.

The Vauxhall site had a history of glassmaking dating back to 1612 when Sir Edward Zouche started a glass works there which was later taken over by Sir Robert Mansell, the Lord High Admiral, who in 1615 obtained a monopoly on the manufacture of glass in England.

Soon after the 1660 Restoration of the Monarchy George Villiers, 2nd Duke of Buckingham acquired the works and established a factory there with the help of John Bellingham to make blown plate glass, recruiting a team of Venetian glassmakers to help establish the process. Although unable to acquire the same monopoly rights as Mansell, whose had lapsed during the Protectorate, he nevertheless, by using his influence at court to secure a ban on the importation of much specialised glass, achieved a near total control over the supply of plate glass in England.

The process involved blowing a glass cylinder, slitting it lengthwise, and allowing it to open to a flat sheet in an oven. It was then ground and polished to achieve a thin sheet with a flat surface. In later years the blowing process was superseded by the casting process. Most of his glass plate, up to 1 metre in size, was used for the manufacture of mirrors and coach windows and was eventually of better quality that could be imported. Around 1680 they were joined by George Ravenscroft, inventor of the more durable lead crystal glass, who worked there until his death in 1683.

In the 1670s the Duke of Buckingham was accused of traitorous activity, locked up in the Tower of London and deprived of his patents. He handed the glassworks over to John Dawson, who had started there as an apprentice and worked his way up to become the manager. Dawson went into partnership with glassmaker John Bowles to operate the business and the new company, known as Dawson, Bowles & Company, was owned and run by the two families until it closed in the late 1780s.
