= Vitrolero =

A Vitrolero (Spanish pronunciation: [bitɾoˈleɾo]) is a large, cylindrical shaped, clear container usually made of glass that holds beverages cooled with ice, typically aguas frescas. Vitroleros are very popular in Mexico and can be found in many taquerías and Mexican cuisine restaurants.
