= Dwarf ale glass =

Small drinking glasses from the 17th-19th centuries

Dwarf ale glasses are small drinking glasses with a short or vestigial stem. In use for over 150 years, they were made for drinking strong ale, which became fashionable from the mid-17th century and into the 18th century.

== Purpose and appearance ==
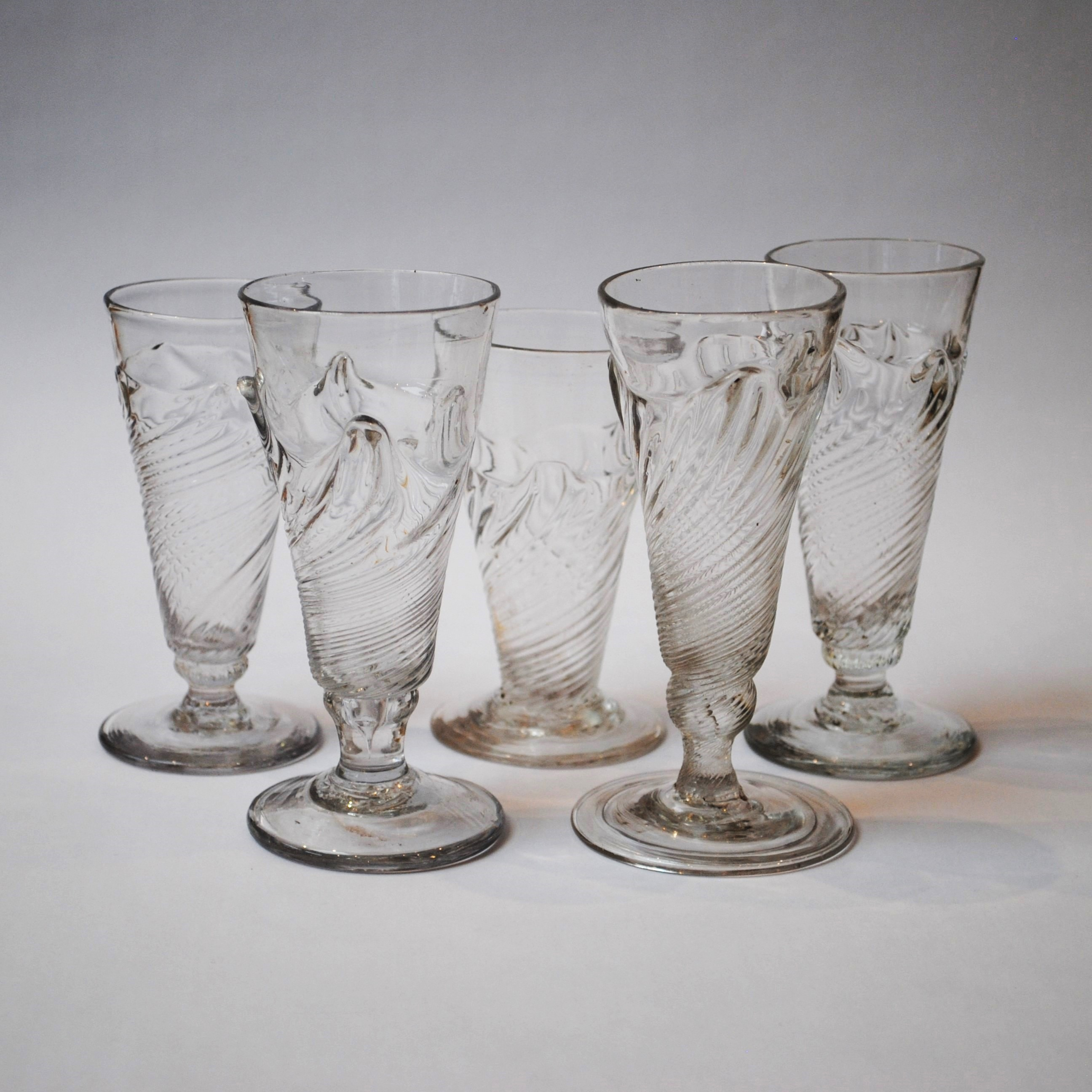
A collection of 18th century English dwarf ale glasses.

Drinking glasses reserved for one particular alcoholic drink is a relatively modern concept. Dwarf ale glasses would have been used for other beverages in addition to ale. They are characterized by the presence of a funnel (or rounded funnel) bowl with a short, rudimentary or vestigial stem. They are typically 125 mm in height and hold around 100 mL of liquid. There are many exceptions to this rule, though.

By modern standards, dwarf ale glasses may seem small when compared to tankards, pint glasses and other contemporary ale and beer glasses. In a historical context, however, small drinking glasses were reserved for strong alcoholic beverages, and they were especially fitting for strong ale. In recent years, there has been a significant cultural shift in this matter. This is best exemplified by the sevenfold increase in wine glass capacity over the last 300 years.

Owing to the large time period in which they were produced, dwarf ale glasses are varied in their appearance. A common form is the wrythen (twisted) dwarf ale glass, which is encountered with tight or wide wrythening on the bowl. In addition, the wrythen-moulding can extend from the bowl to the stem of the glass or be limited to half of the bowl. A rare type is the flammiform (flame-like gadrooning) dwarf ale glass, which was popular at the turn of the 18th century. Other forms are frequently found engraved with hop cone and barley ear motifs. Early glasses are often adorned with a conical folded foot, but this is not necessarily a prerequisite of age. Moreover, some 19th century glasses possess a folded foot.

== Age and chronology ==
The glasses were made and used from the late 17th century into the 19th century.

Determining the age dwarf ale glasses is challenging due to them being manufactured throughout the 18th century and into the 19th in high numbers. Some dwarf ale glasses can be reliably dated as early examples. In particular, those possessing winged or propeller knops are attributed to the late 17th and early 18th century. Dwarf ale glasses with gadrooned wrythening, including those with a flammiform fringe, are often dated as early to mid-18th century. Indeed, some authors go further and attribute heavy gadrooning as being indicative of earlier examples (late 17th century). However, others note that flammifrom glasses were made throughout the 18th century.

Contemporaneous descriptions of drinking glasses are generally vague by modern standards. However, 'Twisted ales' are listed in bankruptcy sales from 1823. This likely refers to wrythen ale glasses, which are still commonly found in antique shops and online auction sites.

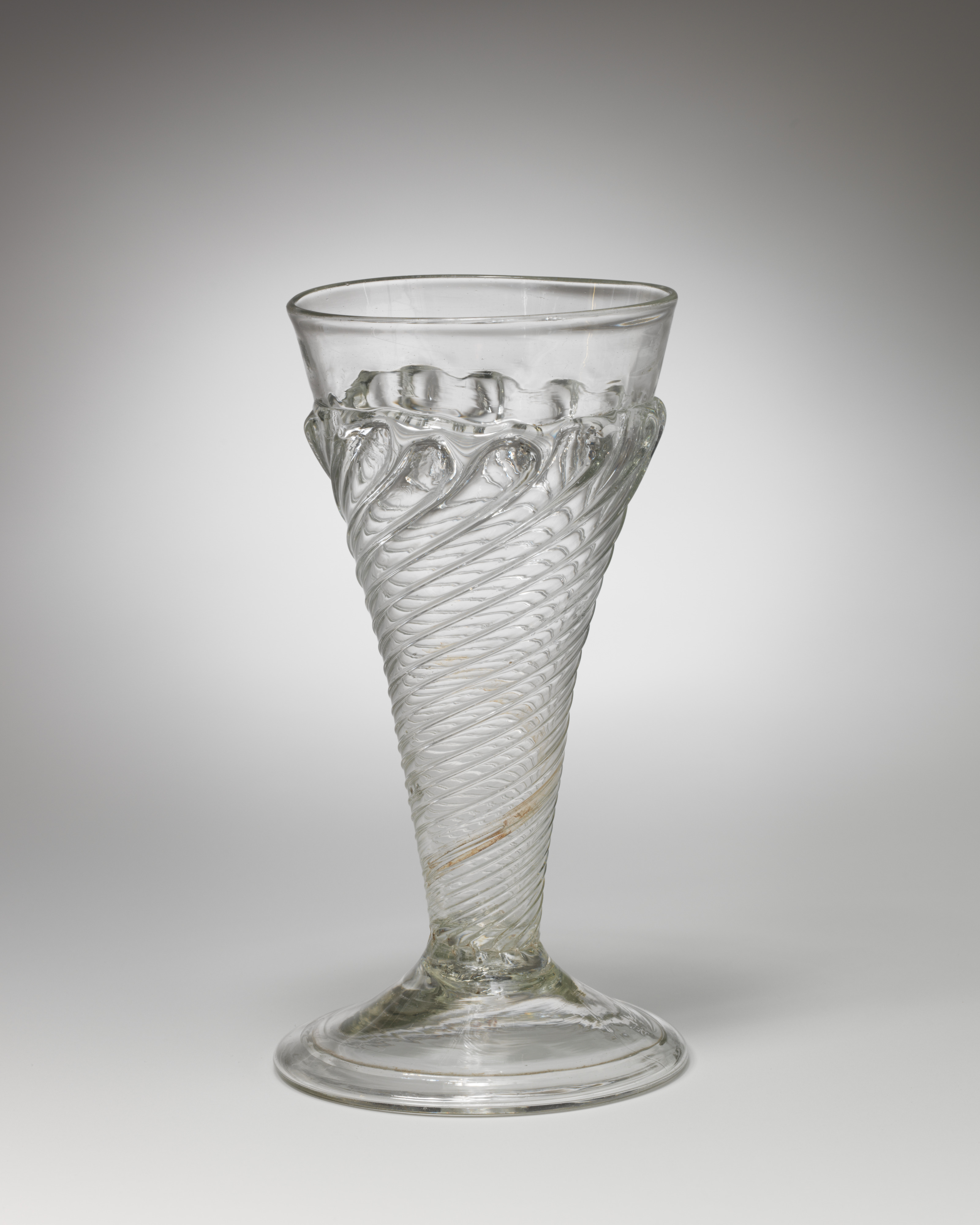
Gadrooned ale glass (c1730).

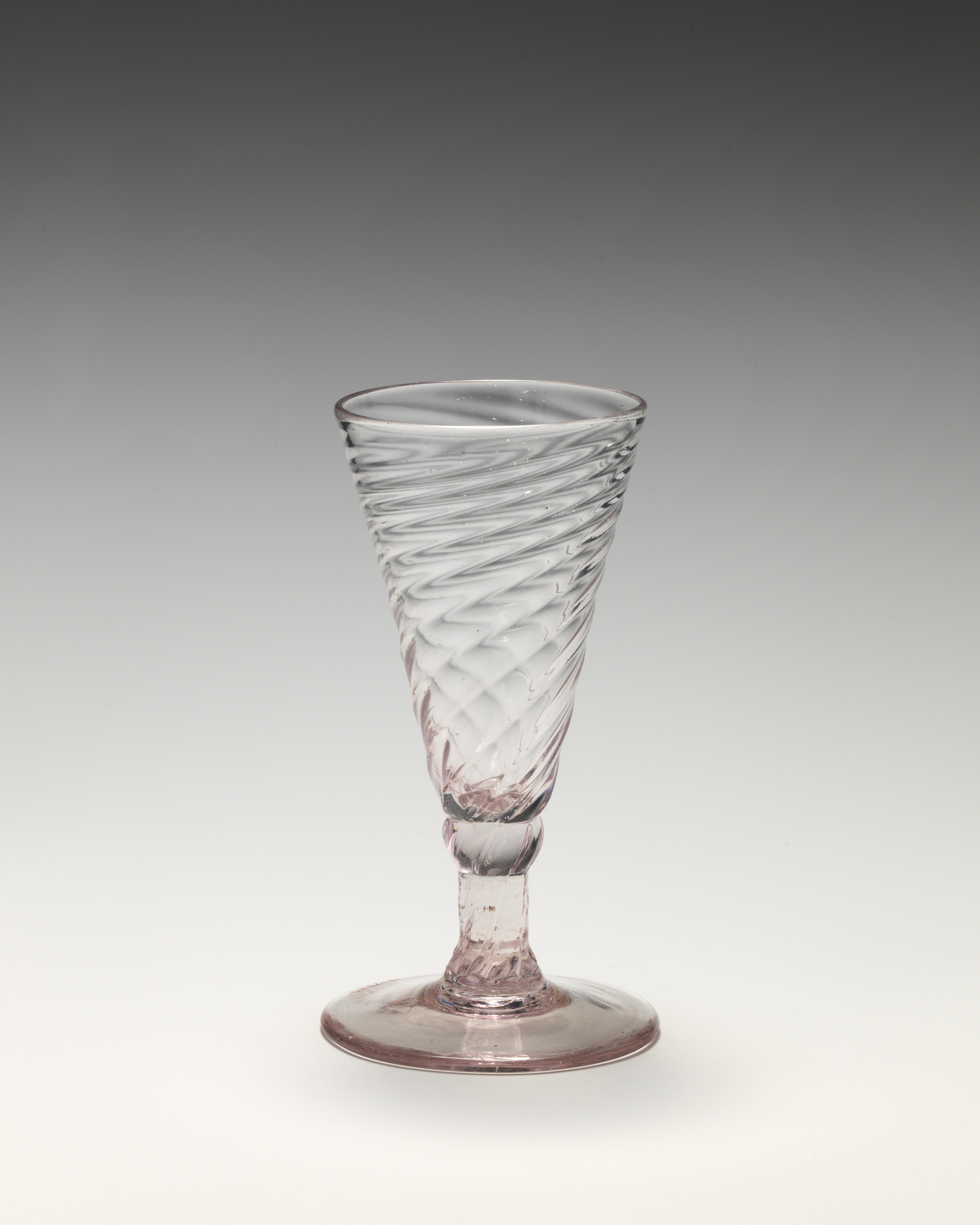
Wrythen ale glass (c1800).

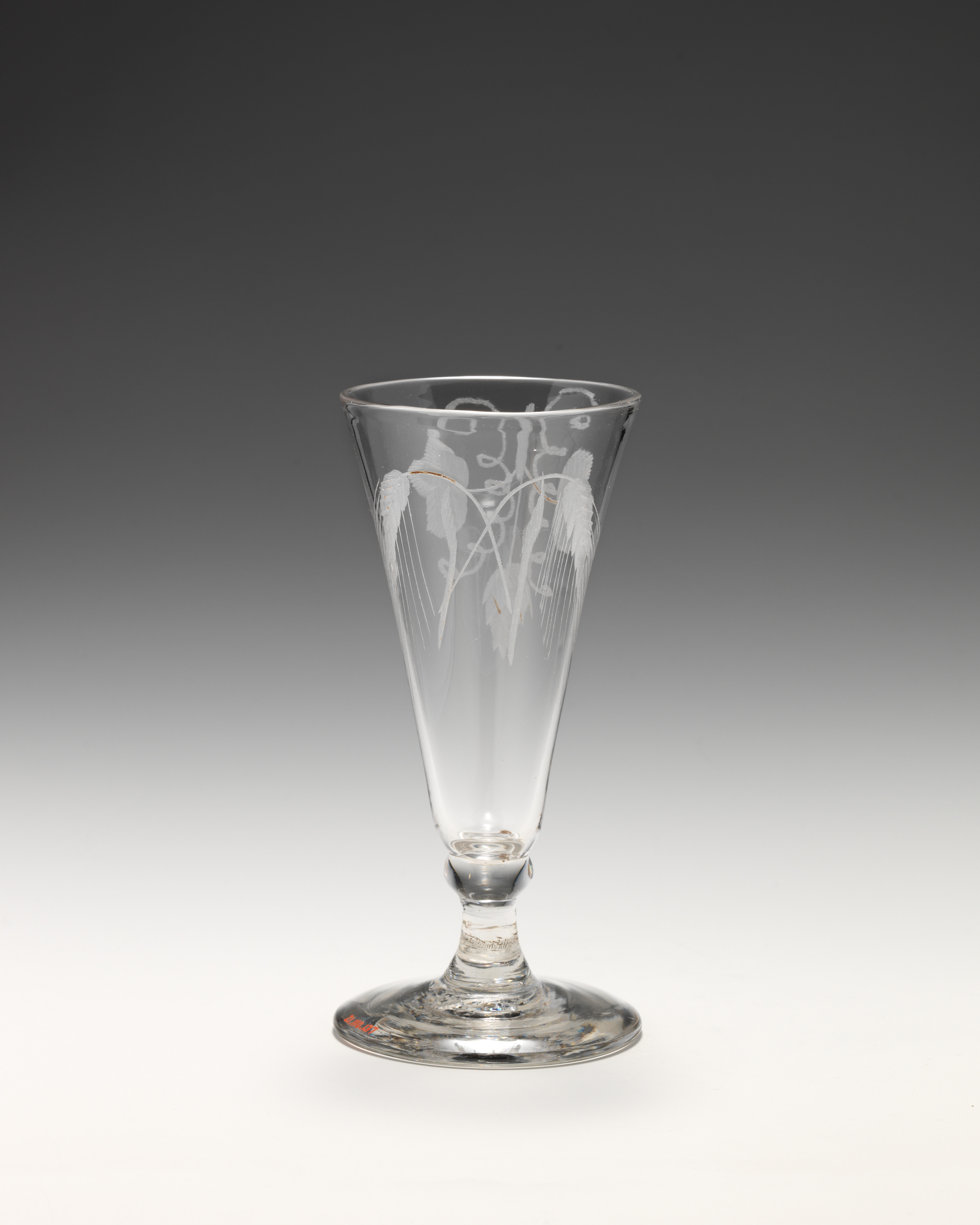
Hop and barley engraved ale glass (c1780).

== Use in society ==
Strong ales and beer were played an important role in society during most of the Georgian period. From the mid-17th century, strong ales became particularly fashionable. Strong ales of this period were fermented up to 11% ABV and would have been similar to modern day barley wines. They were known by names such as Huff-Cap, Nippitate and Hum-Cup, so called because it caused "a humming sensation in the head". Due to the high sediment content, ale was typically decanted into small glasses. Indeed, one can gauge the popularity of dwarf ale glasses by the high number and variety that have been preserved to the present day.

There are limited contemporaneous drawings, paintings and engravings which demonstrate their use in society. However, some illustrations exist which show their use. Moreover, written accounts from the late 17th century exist which allude to the small capacity of 'the Glasses as we drinke Somerset ale out of'. Somerset was particularly famous for strong ales in this period.

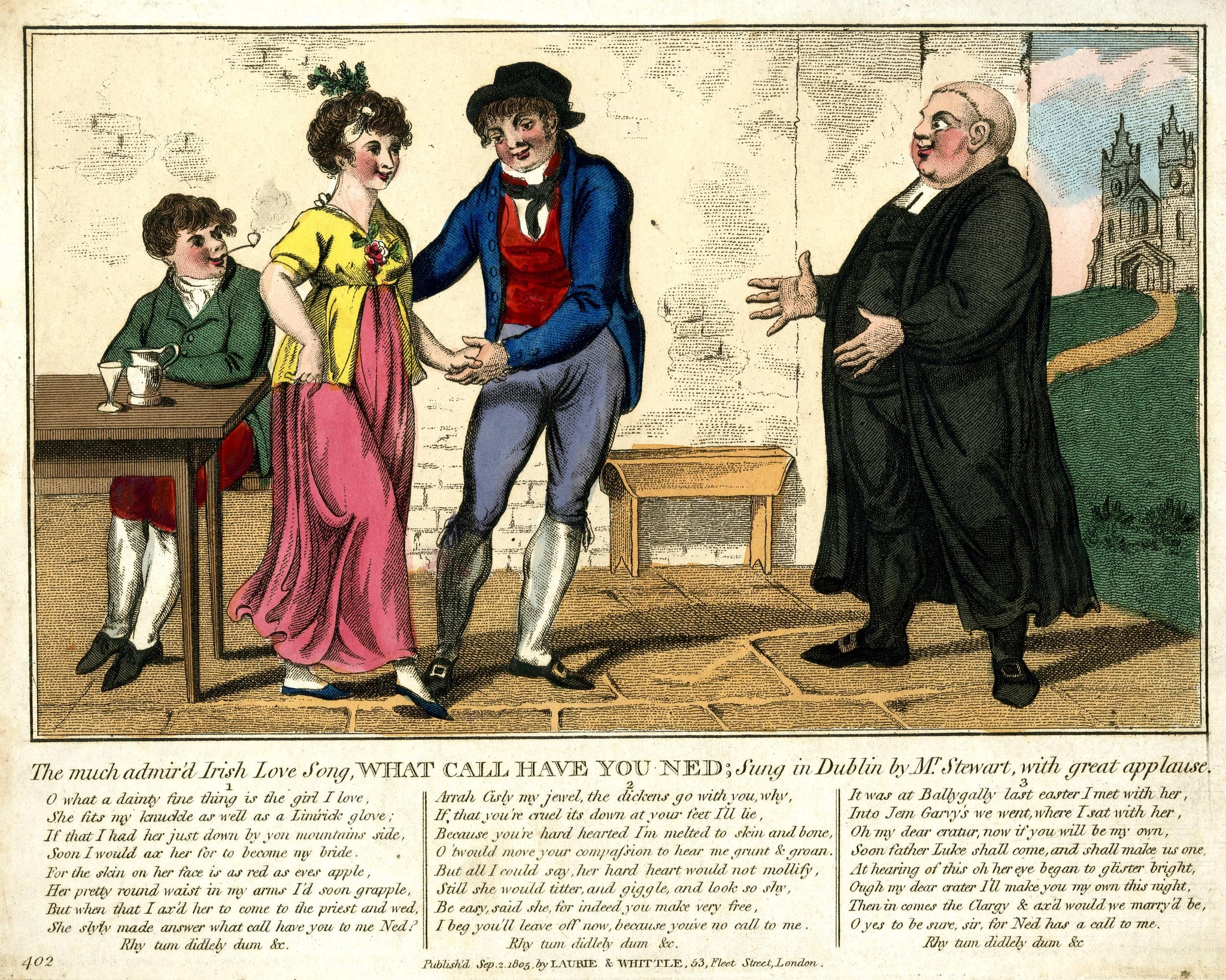
A Laurie & Whittle print showing a "youth" drinking and smoking in the porch of an ale house (1805).

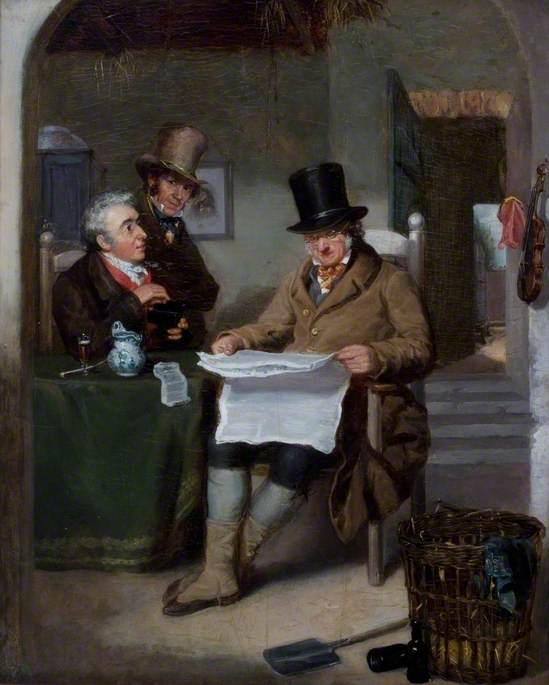
Reading the News by David Wilkie (1820).

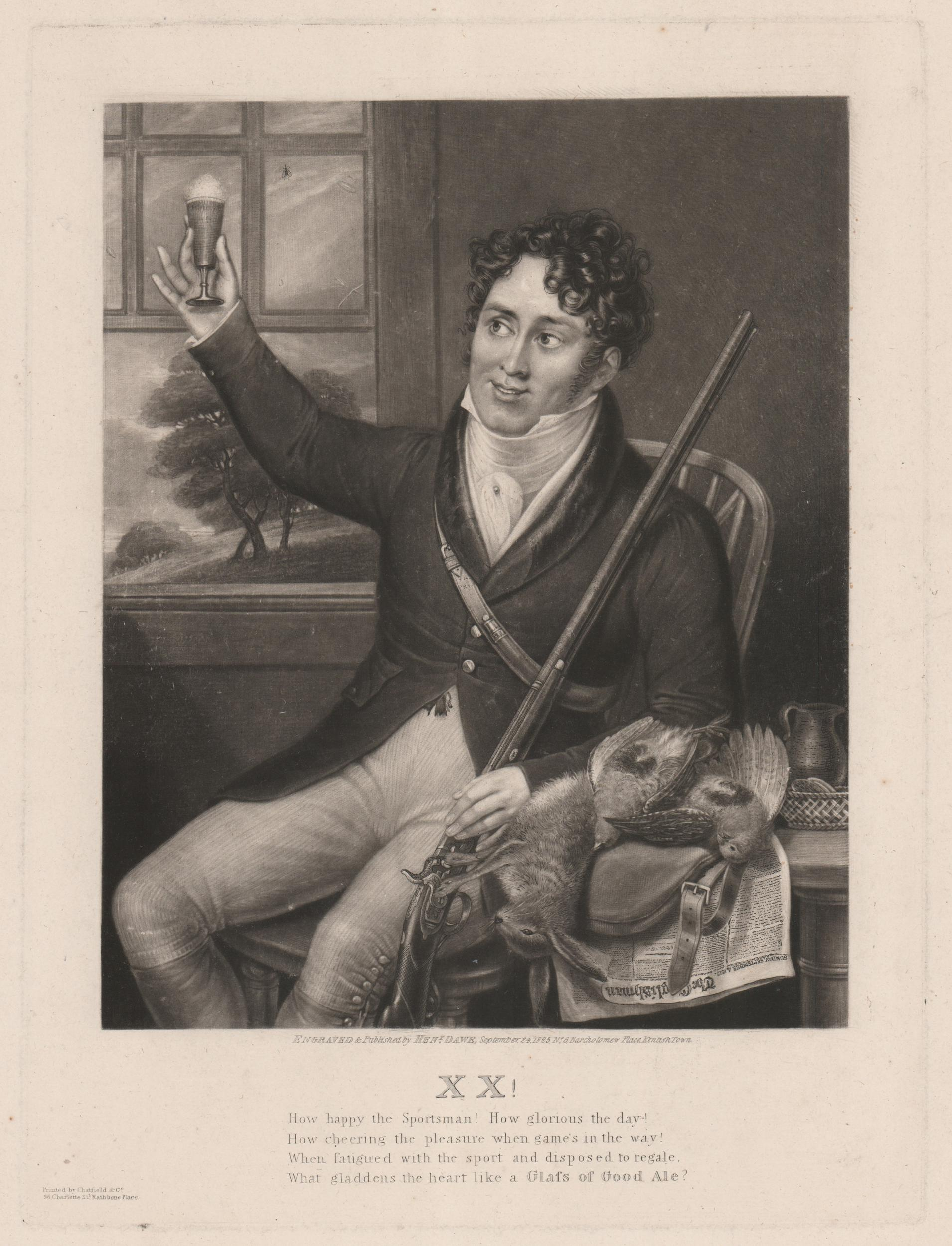
A young man sitting at a window holding up a small glass of ale (1825).

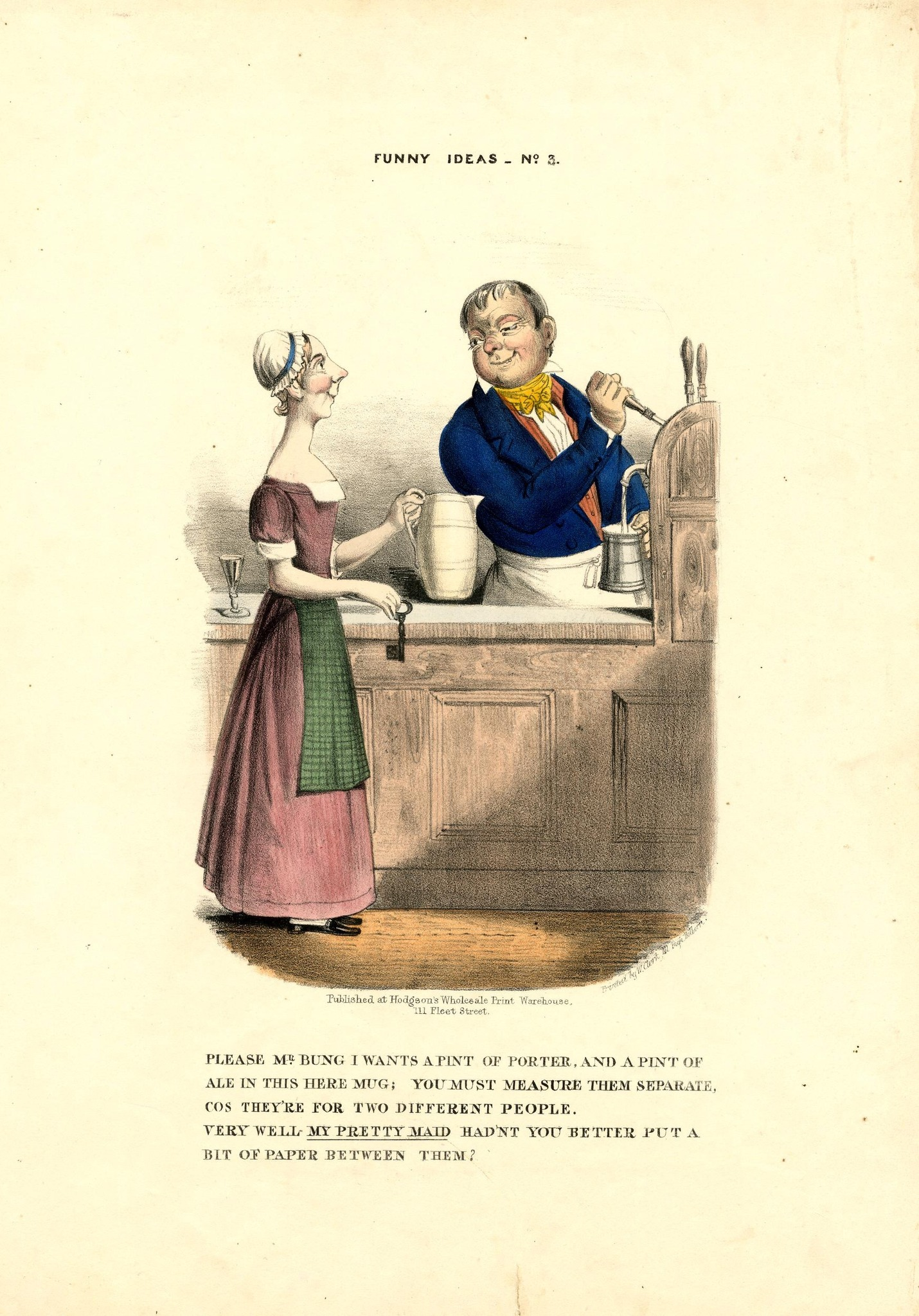
A W & J O Clerk hand-coloured lithograph showing a maid asking a publican to put two different kinds of beer into one jug (1835-1840).

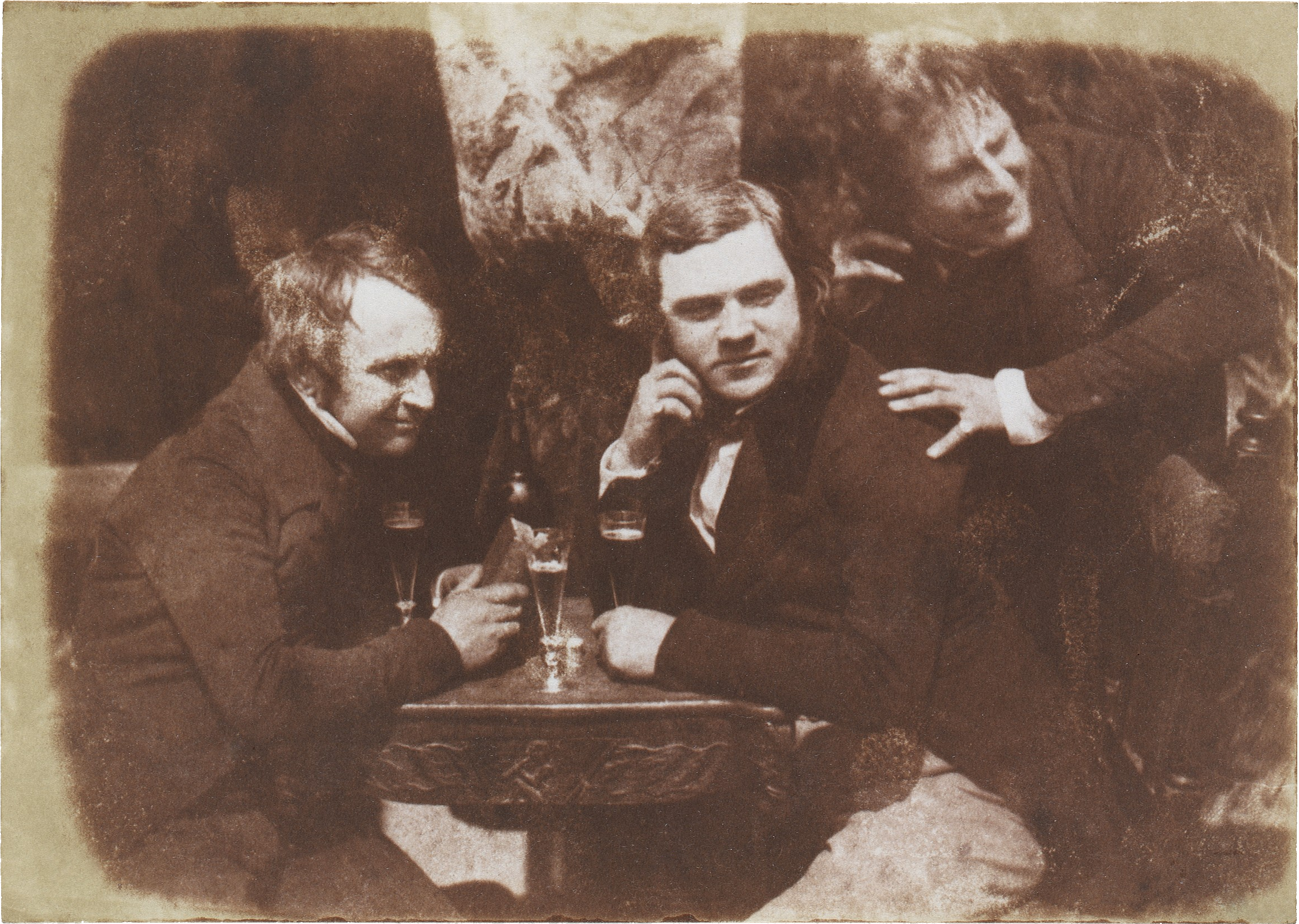
Edinburgh Ale by Hill & Adamson (c1844).

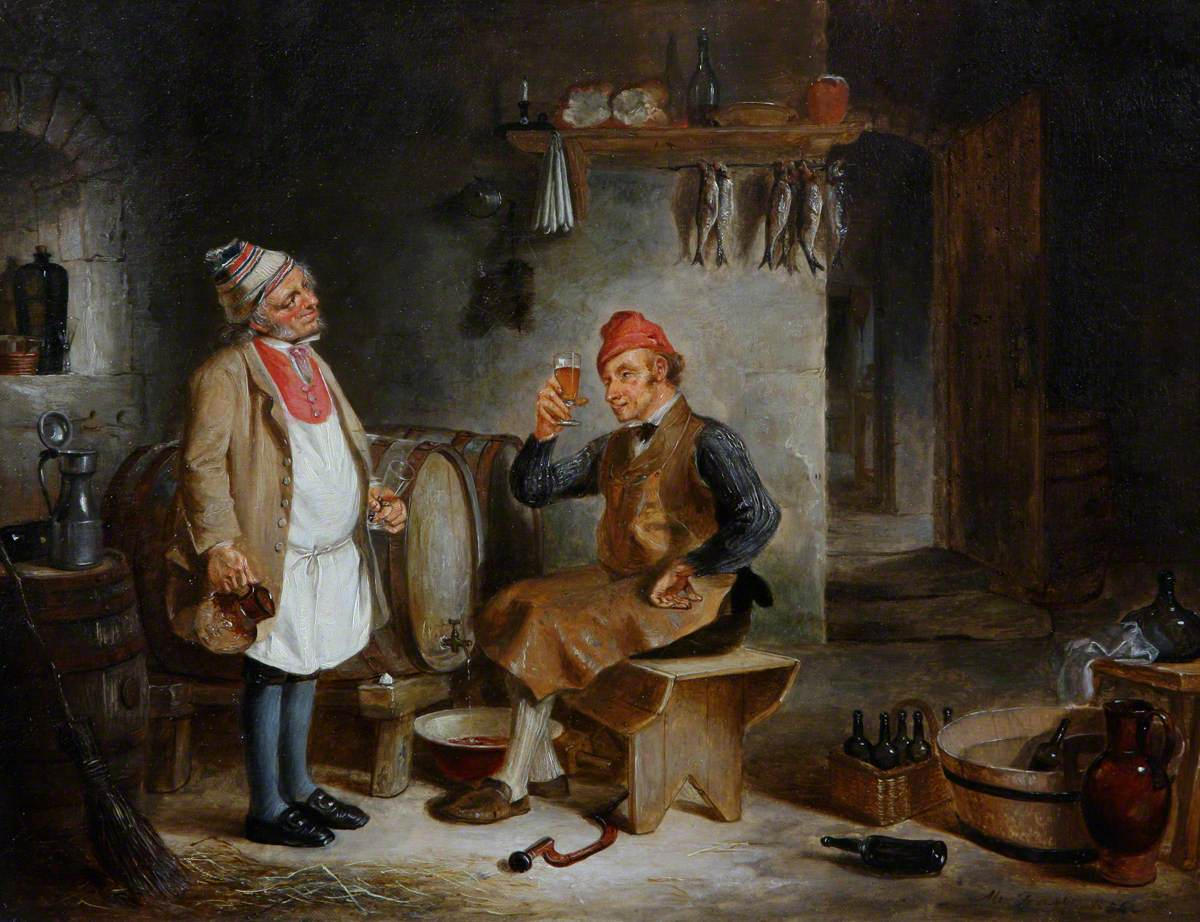
Ale Cellar, Tapping the Barrel by Alexander George Fraser (c1854).

With the invention of photography in the 19th century, it was possible to gain an accurate insight into the drinking practices within inns, pubs and taverns. Indeed, the staged photograph by Hill & Adamson shows three gentlemen sharing a bottle of strong ale. As can clearly be seen on the table, ale flutes are being used. The ale flutes in question are similar in form and capacity, albeit with a slightly elongated bowl and stem, to dwarf ale glasses. Although stage, the photograph gives a brief window through time into the past practice of consuming strong ale in small glasses.

== See also ==
- Beer glassware
- Heavy baluster glass
- Eighteenth-century English drinking glasses
