= William Beilby =

English glassworker (1740–1819)

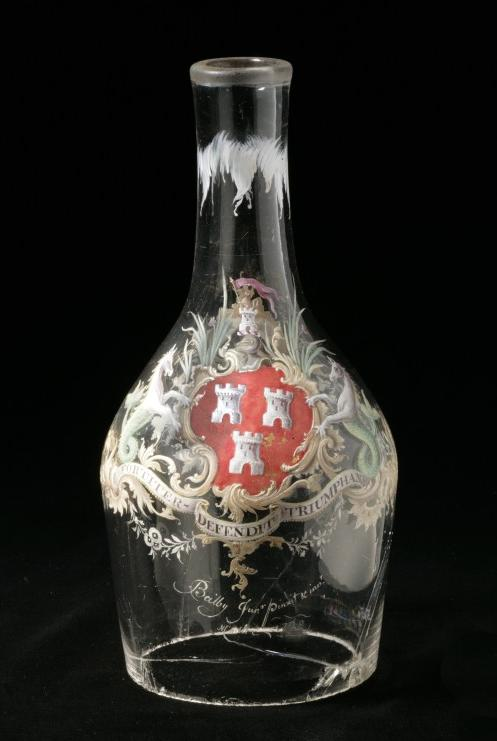
Decanter, 1762, William Beilby V&A Museum no. C.620-1936

William Beilby (1740 – 8 October 1819) was an English glassworker known to have produced eminent enamelled glass during the later half of the 18th century.

Beilby's father William senior was a goldsmith and jeweller in Durham. Beilby, along with his brothers Richard, Ralph and Thomas were sent to grammar school during their childhood. Richard and Beilby, the oldest two, later went as apprentices to Birmingham, the former learning seal engraving and the latter enamelling and drawing. Soon the business of William senior failed, and in 1757 the whole family moved to Newcastle upon Tyne to start again. William senior died eight years later. Richard also died afterwards. Beilby and his sister Mary (1749–97) worked as enamellers for local glass makers.

As Ralph emerged as the business head of the family, Mary spent much of her time with Beilby, who had fallen in love with medieval Newcastle. Beilby was at once fascinated by the thriving glass industry about him, and it seems that it was at the Closegate in 1761 that Beilby became the first man in England to fire enamels into glass, so that they became virtually part of the glass itself.

Beilby taught Mary to paint in enamels at the family workshop in Amen Corner by St Nicholas' Church, though she never matched the skill of her brother. As he achieved greater recognition, Beilby was often called upon to create glasses with fictitious heraldry on them, or pieces commemorating particular events like the election of the Lord Mayor or the launching of a ship. A superb example of the latter is the 'Margaret and Winneford' bowl in the Laing Art Gallery. Beilby glasses can be found in great museums all over the world, and even when damaged are worth tens of thousands of pounds.

Beilby and Mary worked together from 1760 to 1778. In 1767 the young Thomas Bewick joined the family as an apprentice to Ralph. Bewick and Mary developed an affection for each other, though Ralph did all he could to put obstacles in the way of the young pair. After Mary had a stroke in 1774, however, Bewick's ardour cooled.

The family moved from Newcastle to London in 1778 and then to Scotland, where Mary died. Over this last period, the family produced no more glass, but Beilby painted more of his exquisite water colours. Eventually, he moved back to the family roots in Hull in 1810.
