= Heavy baluster glass =

Type of drinking glass

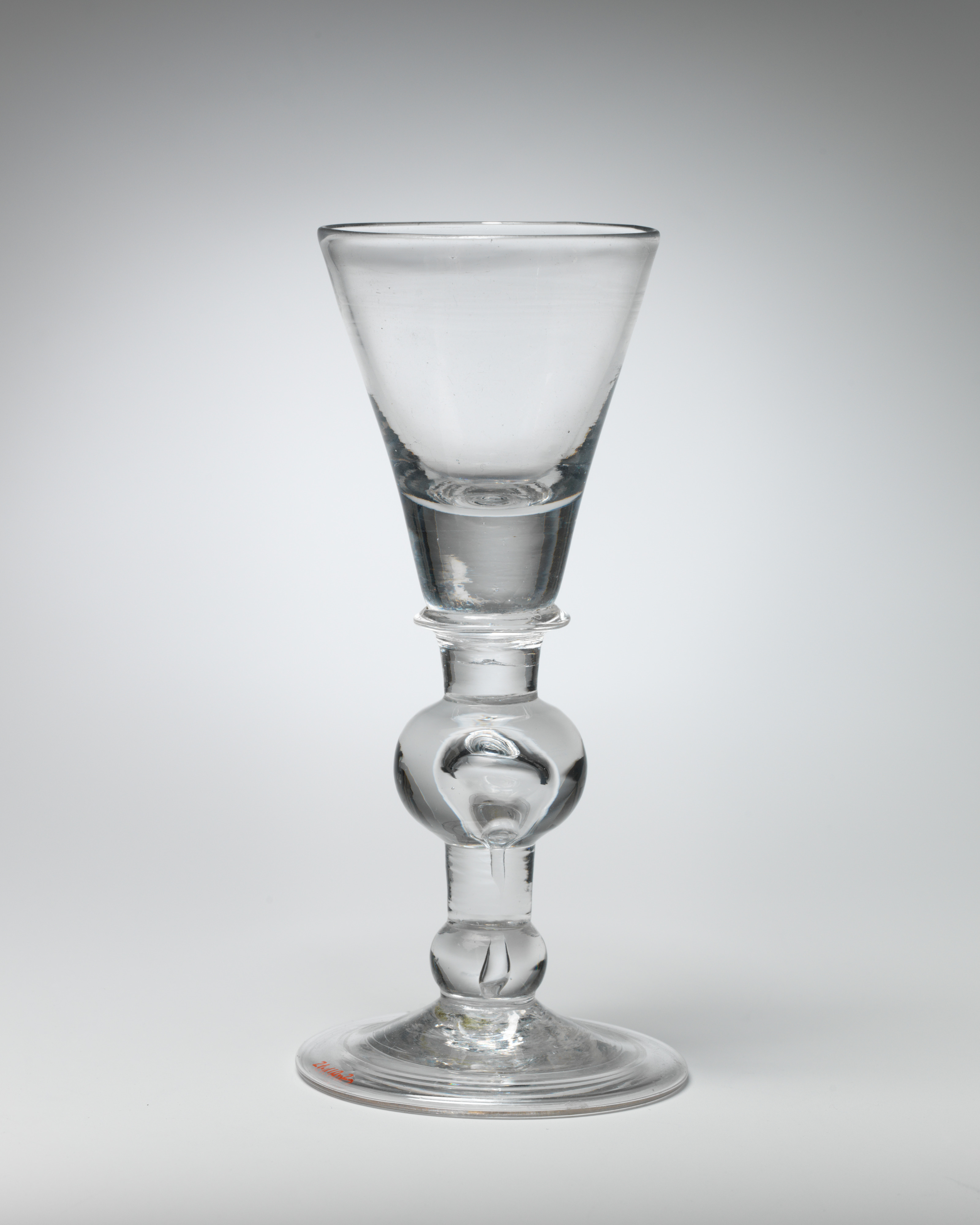
An English heavy baluster wine glass from the early 18th century.

Heavy baluster glasses or goblets (French 'balustre' = 'pomegranate flower') were popular in the period 1680–1740, and they exemplify the golden age of English glass stemware (façon d'Angleterre). The baluster stem is formed in one piece with the bowl of the glass, and is then drawn out to form a tapering stem.

With the manufacture of longer stems the design was embellished with knops or knobs, which were decorative shapes formed in the stem. After about 1720 the heavy baluster glasses were replaced with thinner glass and stems, featuring smaller knops, and known as light balusters or balustroids.

== Naming ==
Baluster glasses were so named because the first stems resembled balusters, starting just from below the bowl and swelling towards the foot. Because the difficulty in grasping such a shape, it was replaced by inverted baluster with a swelling at the top.

== Taxation ==
Taxes in the eighteenth century were imposed according to the weight of the glass, leading to a reduction in the size of the knops and more elegant glasses, known as light balusters or just balusters. When the knops became no more than swellings of the stem, the term balustroid was used.

== Continental examples ==
Continental manufacturers developed similar variations during the 18th century in non-lead glass, taking inspiration from the forms produced in England (façon d'Angleterre) during the first half of the 18th century.

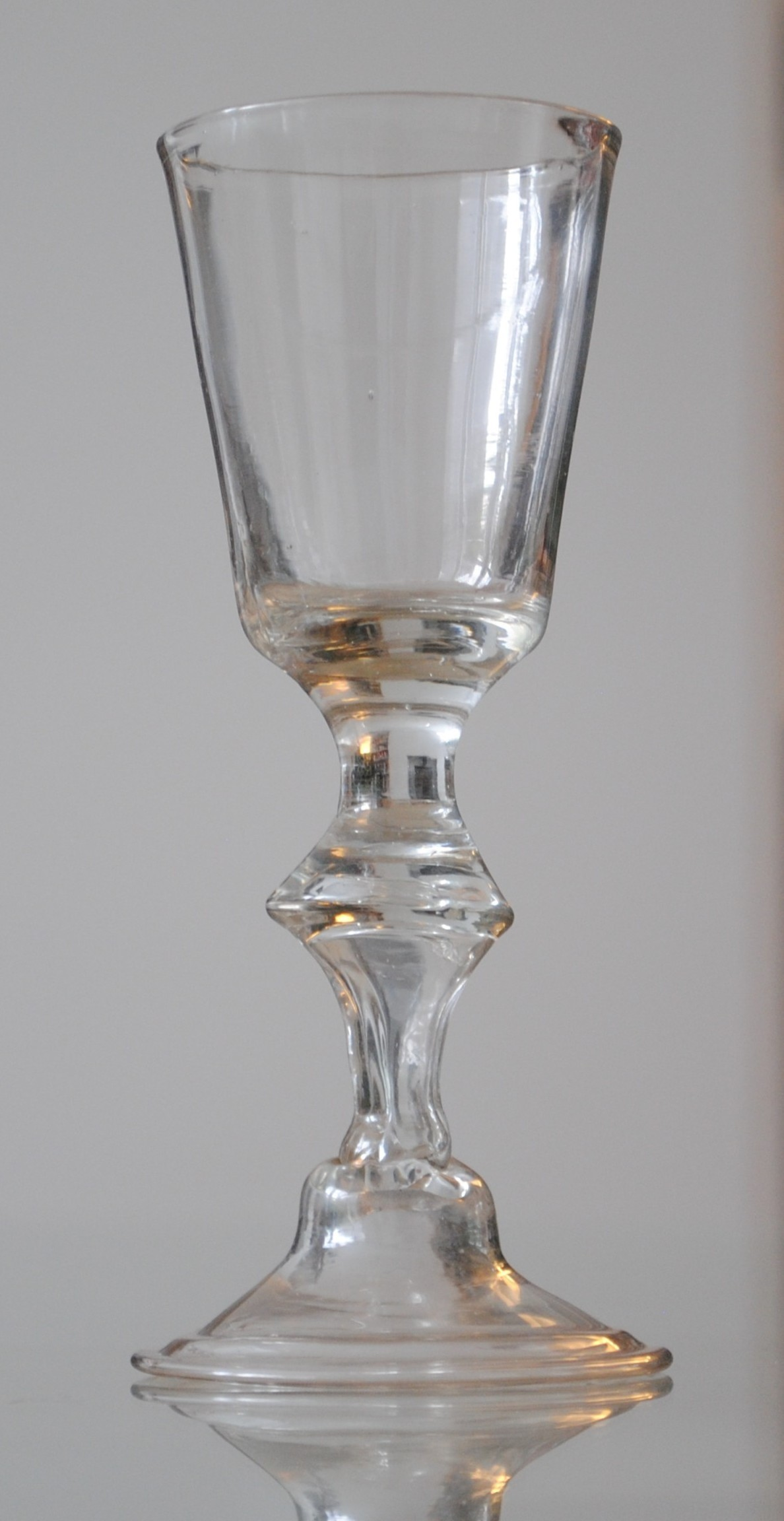
18th Century French Baluster wine glass (Burgundy glass).

== See also ==
- History of glass
- Dwarf ale glass
- Eighteenth-century English drinking glasses
