= Ralph Beilby =

British engraver (1744–1817)

Ralph Beilby (1744–1817) was a British engraver, working chiefly on silver and copper.

He was the son of William Beilby, a jeweller and goldsmith of Durham who later moved to Newcastle upon Tyne to look for better opportunities. Ralph became a silversmith, jeweller, and seal-engraver under his father and elder brothers Richard and William junior. In addition, he became a copper engraver to meet the demand of the then North England market. His plate "Thornton's Monument" in John Brand's History of Newcastle shows his craftsmanship in that field. In 1767 Thomas Bewick was apprenticed to him. They became partners 10 years later.

The texts in Bewick's A General History of Quadrupeds (1790) and History of British Birds: Land Birds (1797) were drafted by Beilby and revised by Bewick. According to Bewick's account, Beilby wanted to have his name appear in Land Birds as the sole author; however, upon Bewick's disagreement, neither of them was named as the author. The partnership came to an end in 1797, after the publication of Land Birds. They were tentatively reconciled in 1800, co-operating again for some projects, including the publication of Figures of British Land Birds. Bewick came to Beilby's defense when the latter had been defamed in a supplement to the third edition of the Encyclopædia Britannica published in 1801.

== Bibliography ==
- Bewick, Thomas (1975). A Memoir of Thomas Bewick. Edited with an introduction by Iain Bain. London; New York: Oxford University Press.
- Dictionary of National Biography (1917). London: Oxford University Press.
- Uglow, Jenny (2006). Nature's Engraver: A Life of Thomas Bewick. London: Faber and Faber.
