= Still Life (Claesz) =

1657 painting by Pieter Claesz

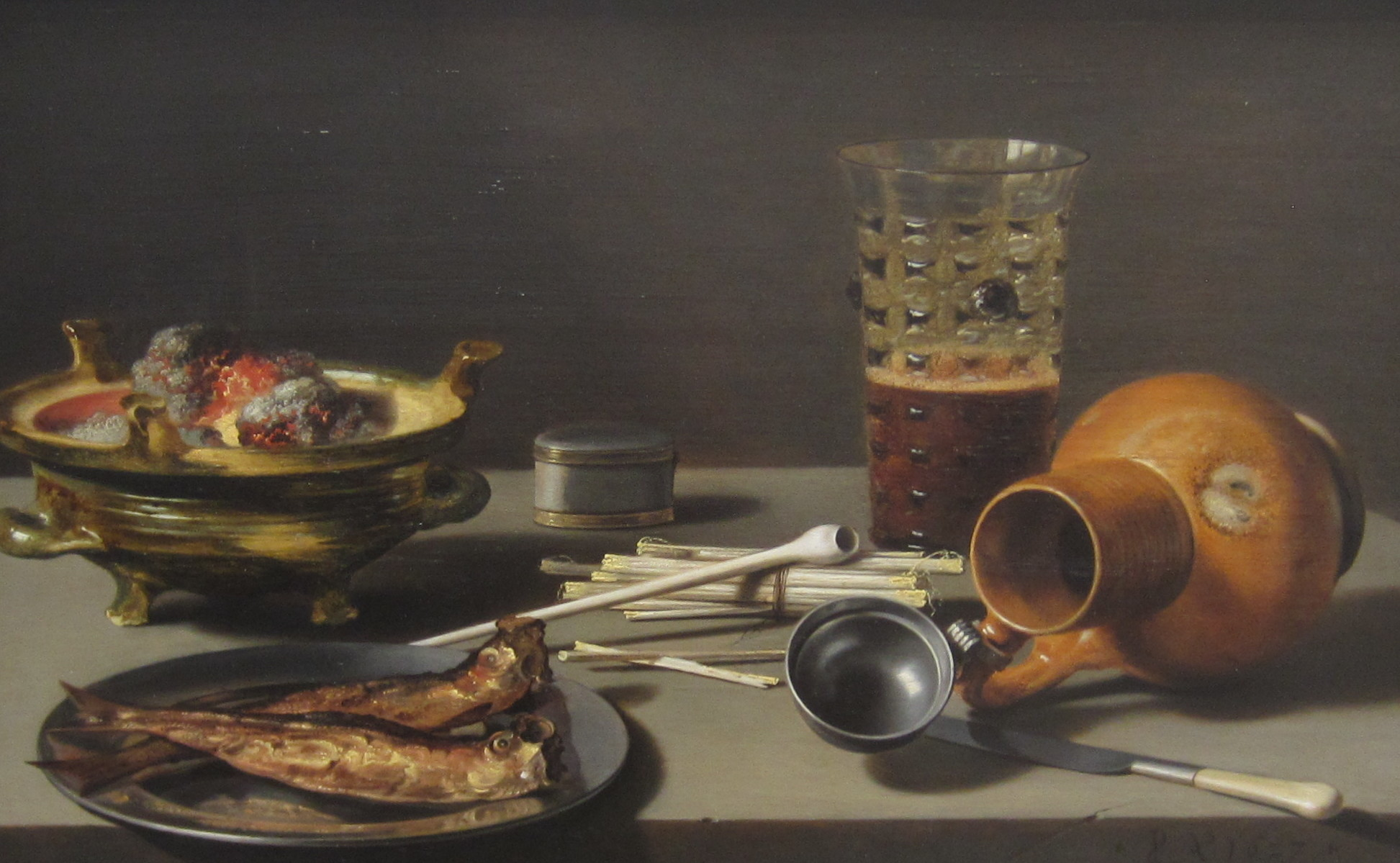
- Artist: Pieter Claesz
- Year: 1627
- Location: Timken Museum of Art, San Diego, California, U.S.

Still Life is a 1657 oil painting by Pieter Claesz. It depicts burning coals in a golden brazier, dried fish, a knocked-over pot, bundled white rods, a knife and a drinking glass half-filled with a dark brown liquid, all sat upon a white surface.
