= Interior of the Nieuwe Kerk, Amsterdam =

1657 painting by Emanuel de Witte

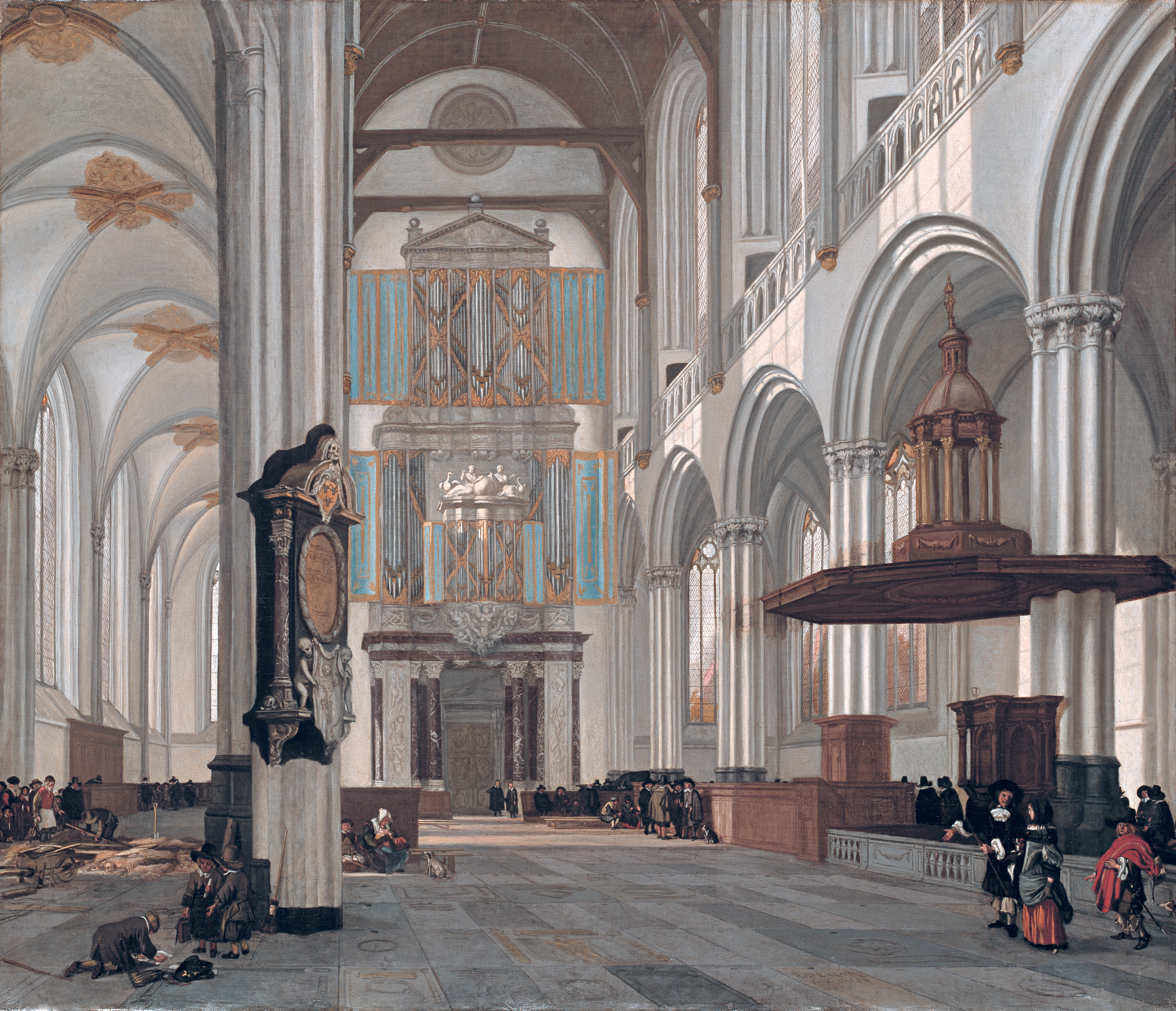
- Year: 1657
- Location: Timken Museum of Art, San Diego, California, U.S.

Interior of the Nieuwe Kerk, Amsterdam is a 1657 oil painting on canvas by Emanuel de Witte.
