= Berkemeyer =

Traditional glass drinking vessel in Germany and the Netherlands

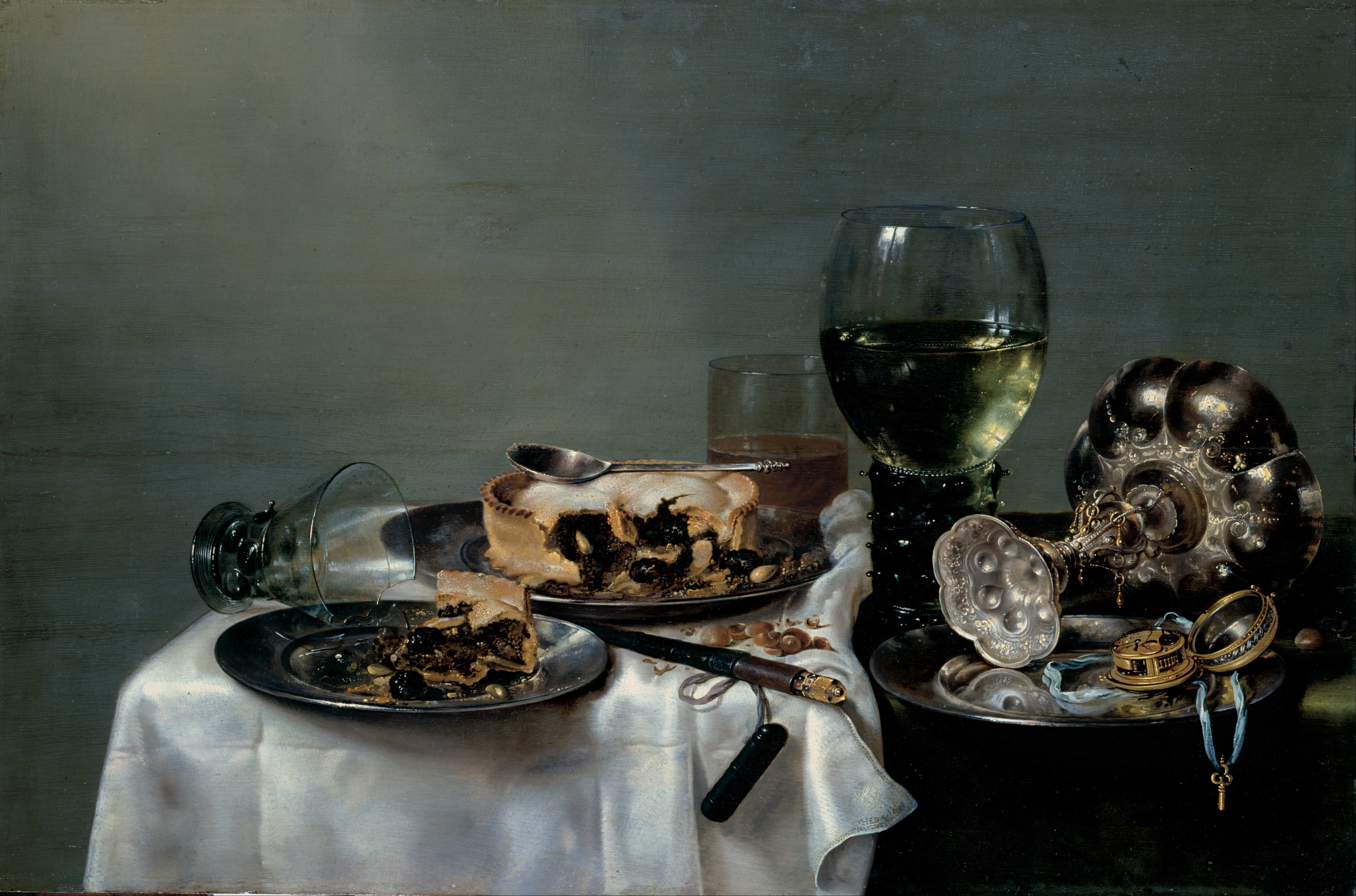
Still life with blackberry pie, a painting by Willem Heda showing a berkemeyer lying on its side and a standing rummer.

A Berkemeyer is a drinking glass with a wide, flared bowl, dating from 15th-century Germany and the Netherlands, and still made today. They have a characteristic green or yellow colour caused by iron impurities in the sand used for glass production. The thick, hollow stem is covered with prunts providing a secure grip for hands greasy from feasting, quite similar to the rummer (Römer). Rummers generally are significantly taller — both at the stem and the bowl — the latter normally being more rounded-out, with an egg-like shape.

The name Berkemeyer comes from the word for the birch tree branches (Dutch: berkemei, German: Birkenzweig) out of which they were once carved. They would also be lidded, similarly to tankards. The prunts on the stems of glasses reminded drinkers of the rough bark of the wooden beakers, hence the association. They were frequently depicted in still lifes of table settings by the Dutch masters in the 17th and 18th centuries.

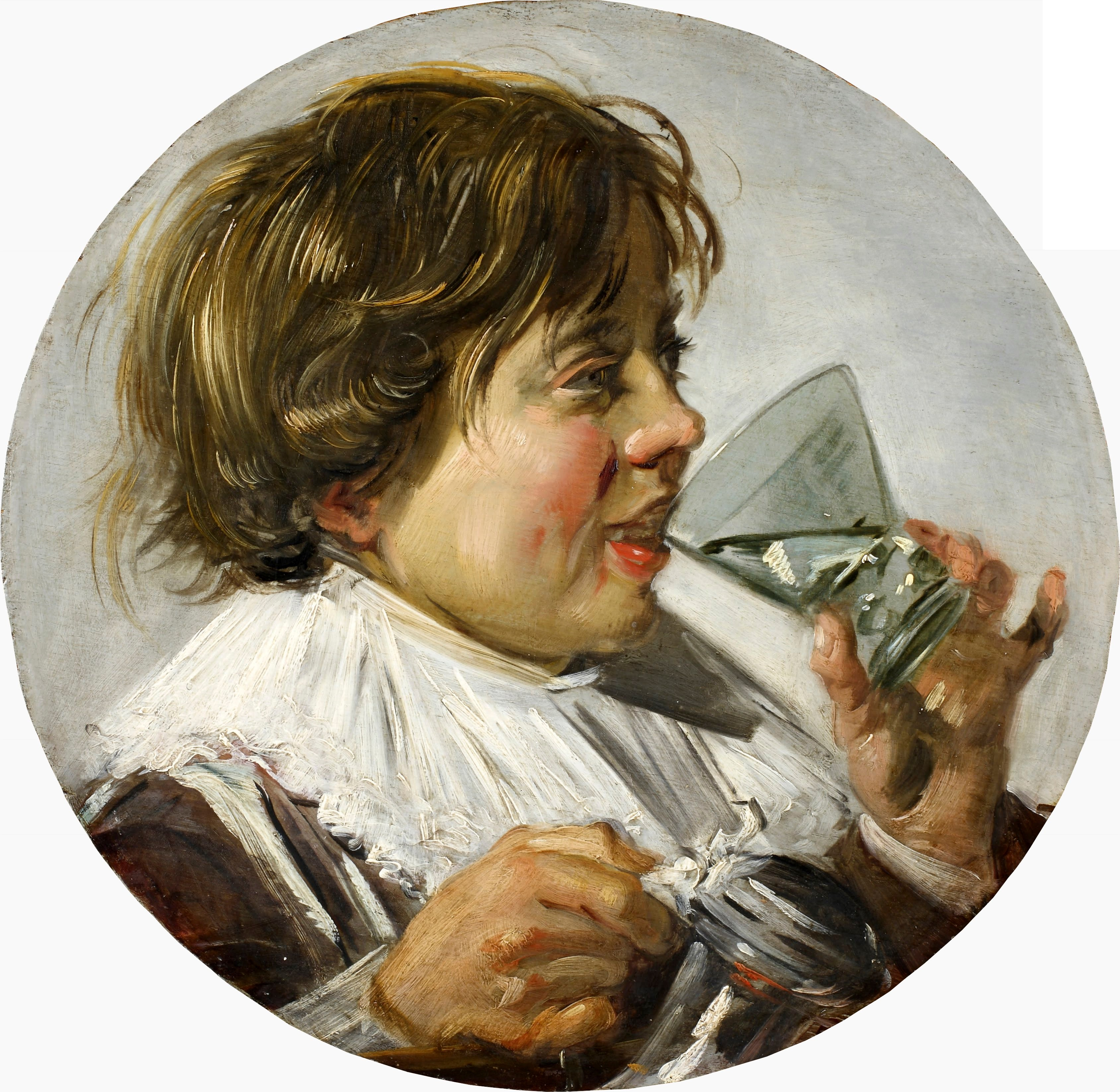
Jongen met glas en tinnen kan (between 1625 and 1628) Frans Hals

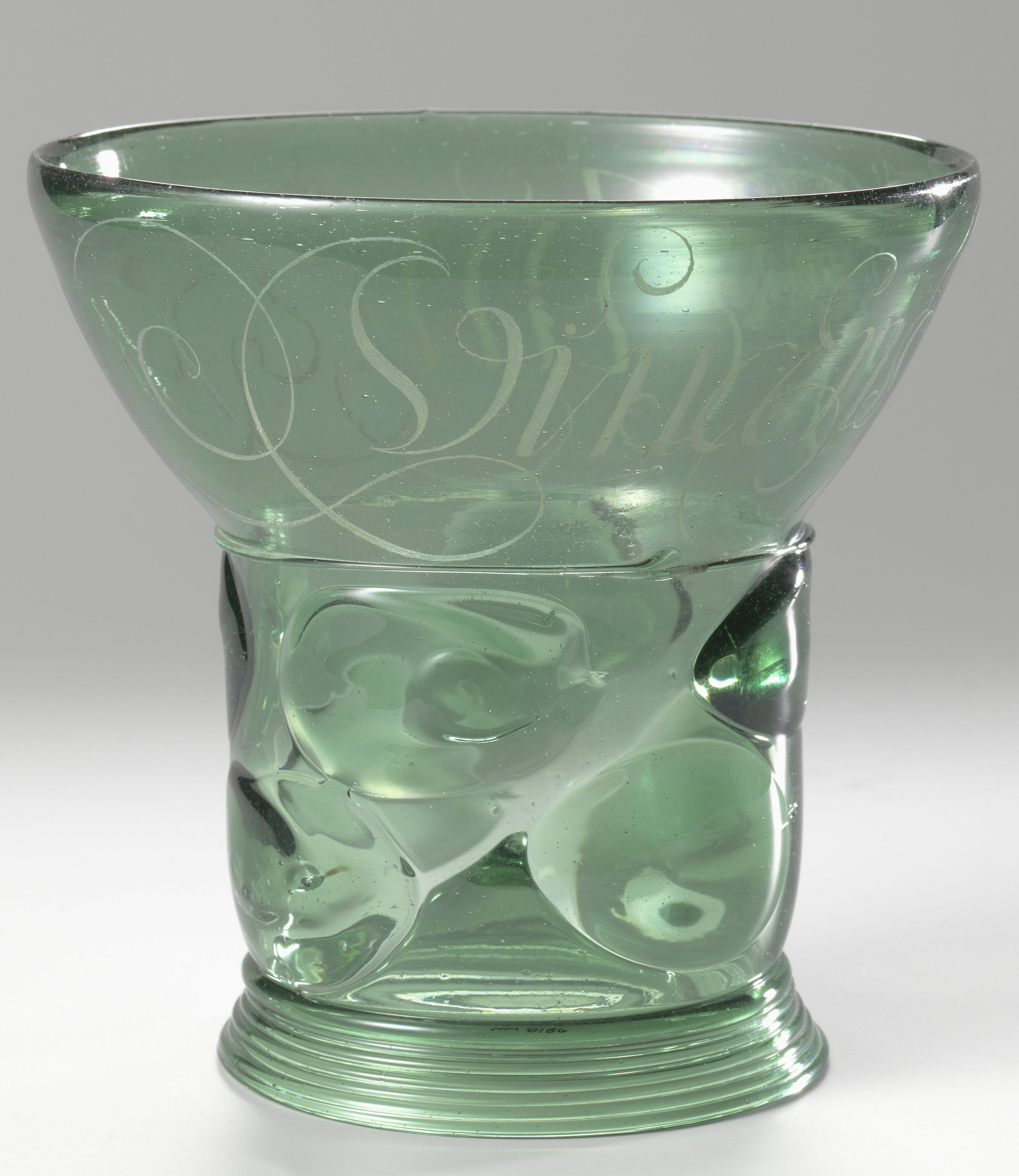
Engraving by Anna Roemers Visscher (1646)
