= Rummer =

Type of large drinking glass

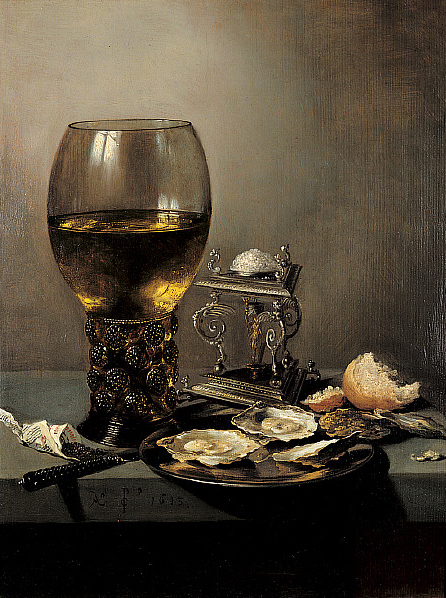
Rummer painted by Pieter Claesz in 1643

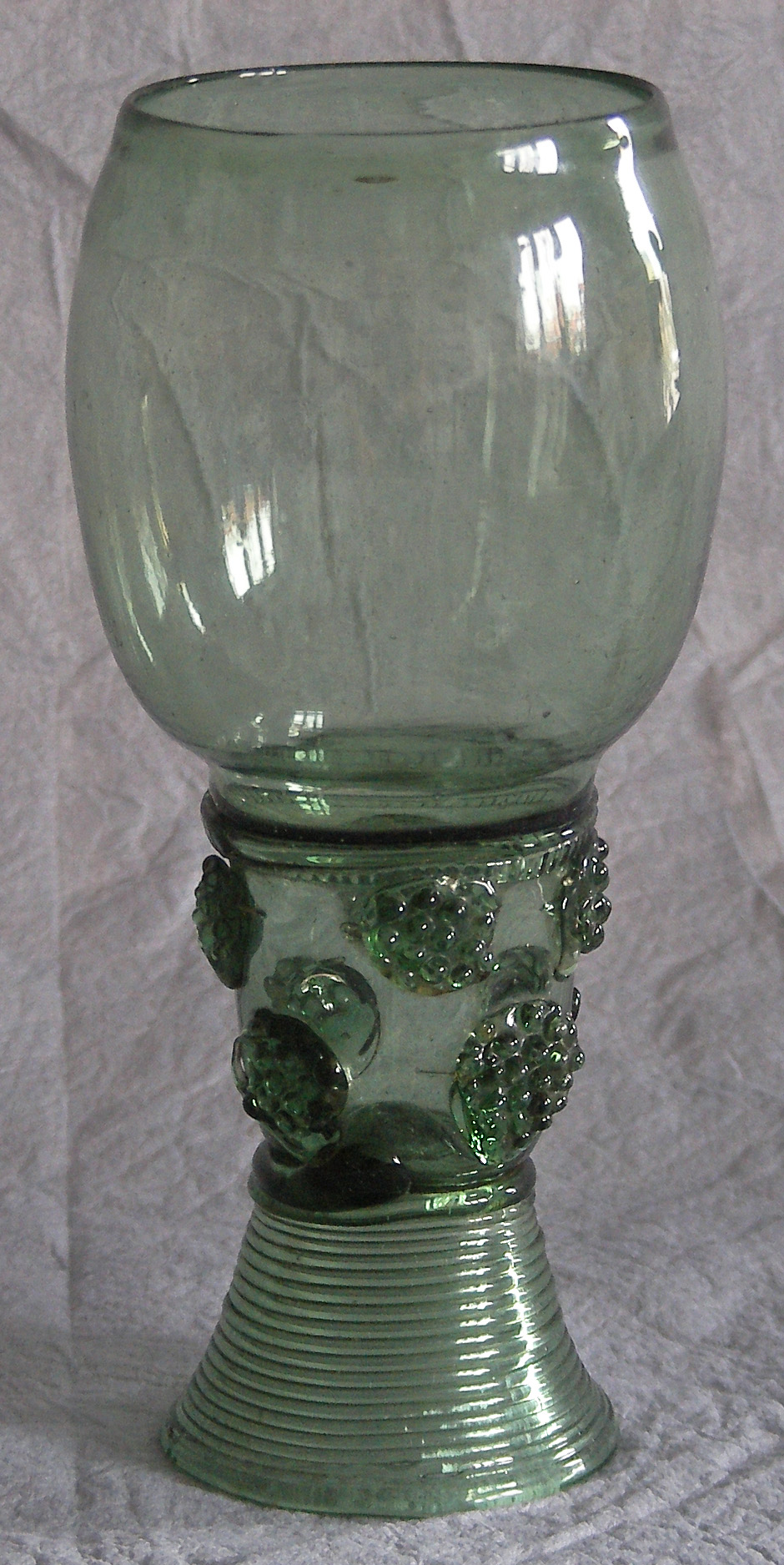
Roemer

A rummer (also known as a Römer or Roemer, among other variations) was a type of large drinking glass studded with prunts to ensure a safe grip, popular mainly in the Rhineland and the Netherlands from the 15th through the 17th century. Rummers lacked the flared bowl of the Berkemeyer and had much thinner walls. The hollow base was built up by coiling strands of molten glass around a conical core. Römers were quite distinct from the Berkemeyers, but both types evolved from the German "cabbage stalk" glasses which were cylindrical with prunts. Römers are usually green in colour and with Berkemeyers were sometimes engraved with images and inscriptions.

== Production ==
From as early as the third century AD, skilled glass workers along the Rhine were producing work of great artistic merit. Excavations at Worms, Trier, Cologne, and in the Eifel revealed glass factories that were probably Roman in origin—indeed, Römer is German for 'Roman'. Ancient Rhenish graves have yielded gilt-decorated bowls and beakers which were made using the fondo d'oro ('base of gold') process in which the design is etched into a layer of gold on the glass surface, and then covered by more glass. These techniques persisted to the fifth century, mythical and biblical themes enjoying great popularity. Out of this era grew that hallmark of German glass, the prunt, a design feature which is still found fifteen centuries later.

The word Roemer was anglicised to become rummer, and English variants were widely produced from the late 18th century and throughout the 19th. Many Victorian rummers were engraved with both personal tributes and masonic symbols. Of all antique stemwares these are possibly the most usable, there are still some specialist dealers in the UK.

== Gallery ==
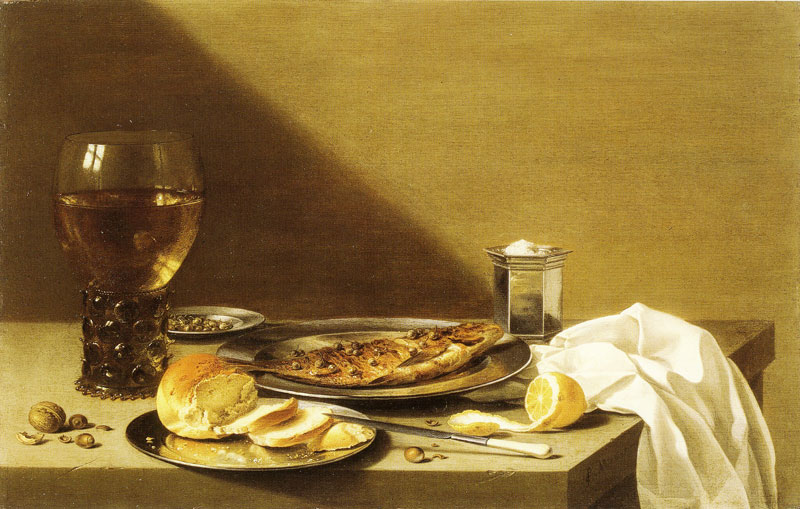
Still Life with Walnut, Bread, and Herring with Silver Salt Cellar and Glass of Wine, Pieter Claesz, 1628.

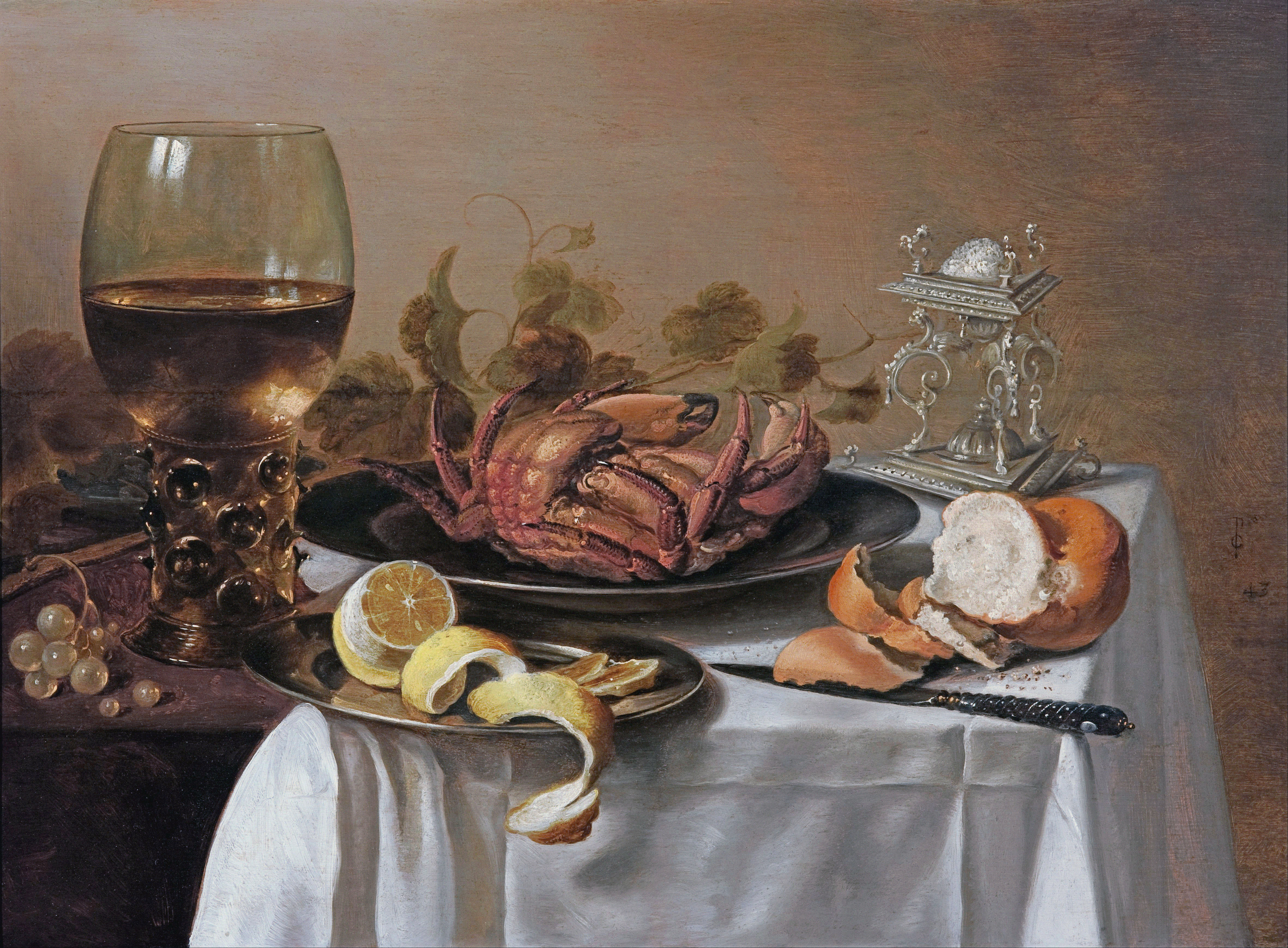
A still life with a roemer, a crab and a peeled lemon, Pieter Claesz, 1643

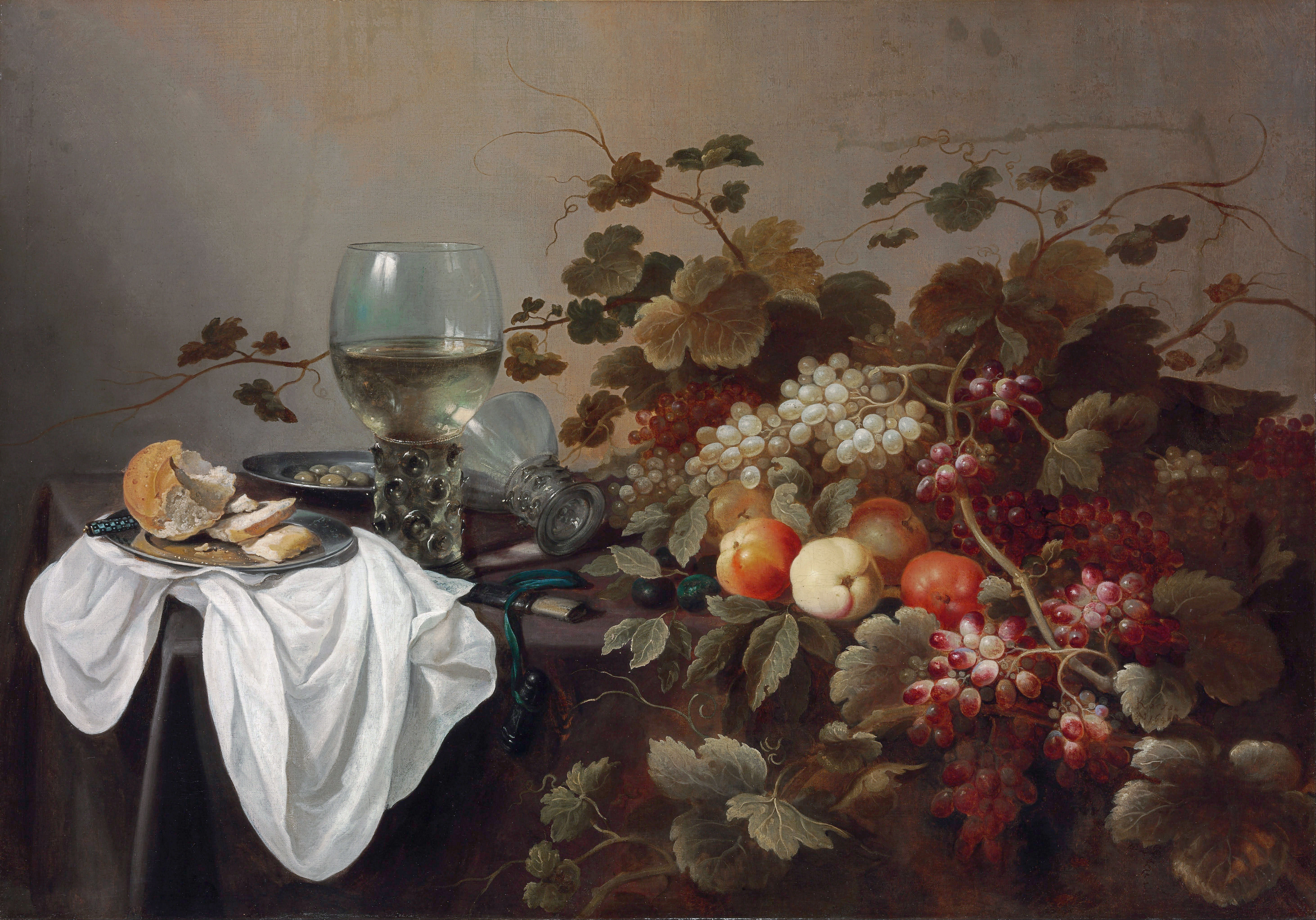
Still Life with Fruit and Roemer, 1644

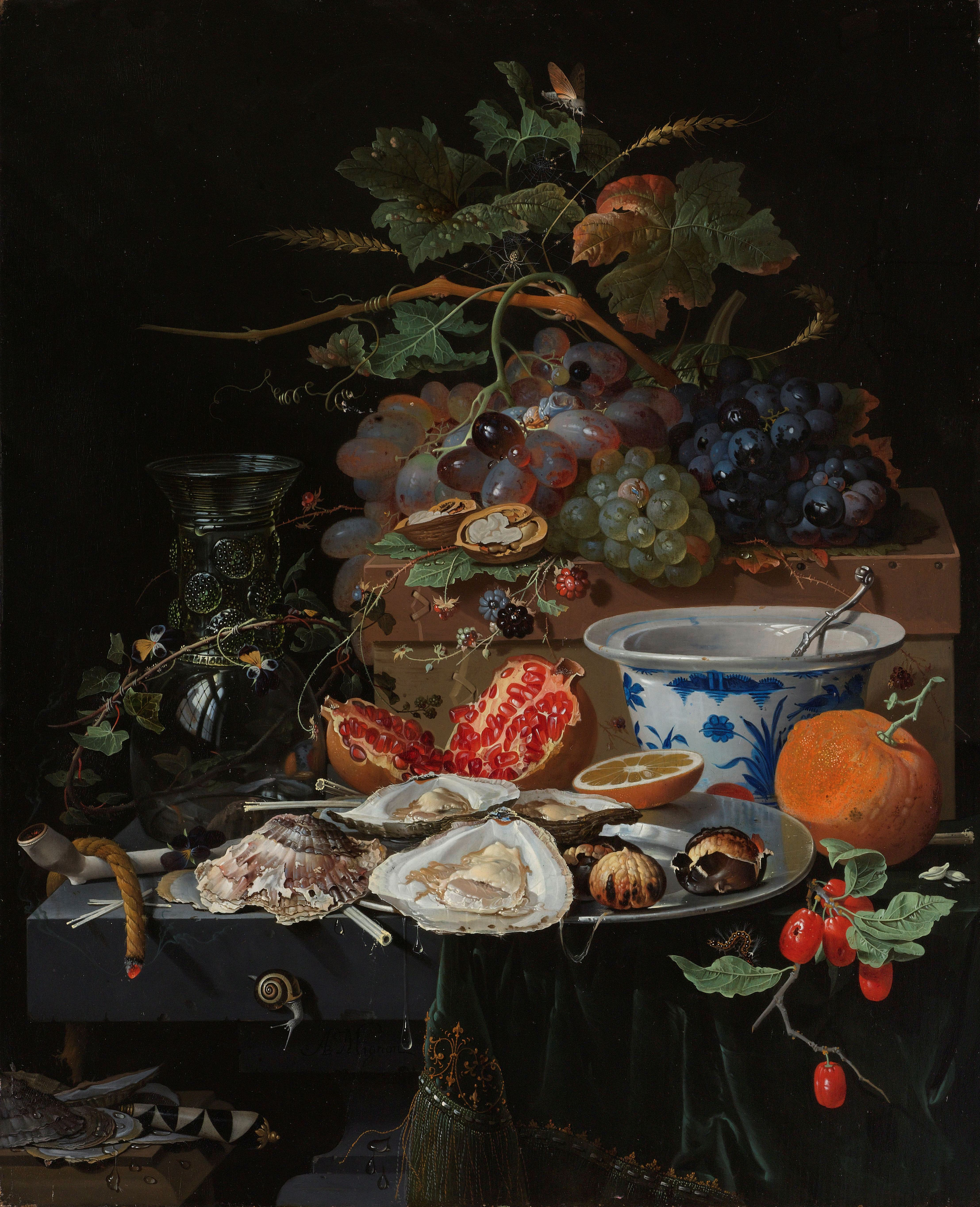
Stilleven met vruchten, oesters en een porseleinen kom by Abraham Mignon (1660–1679)

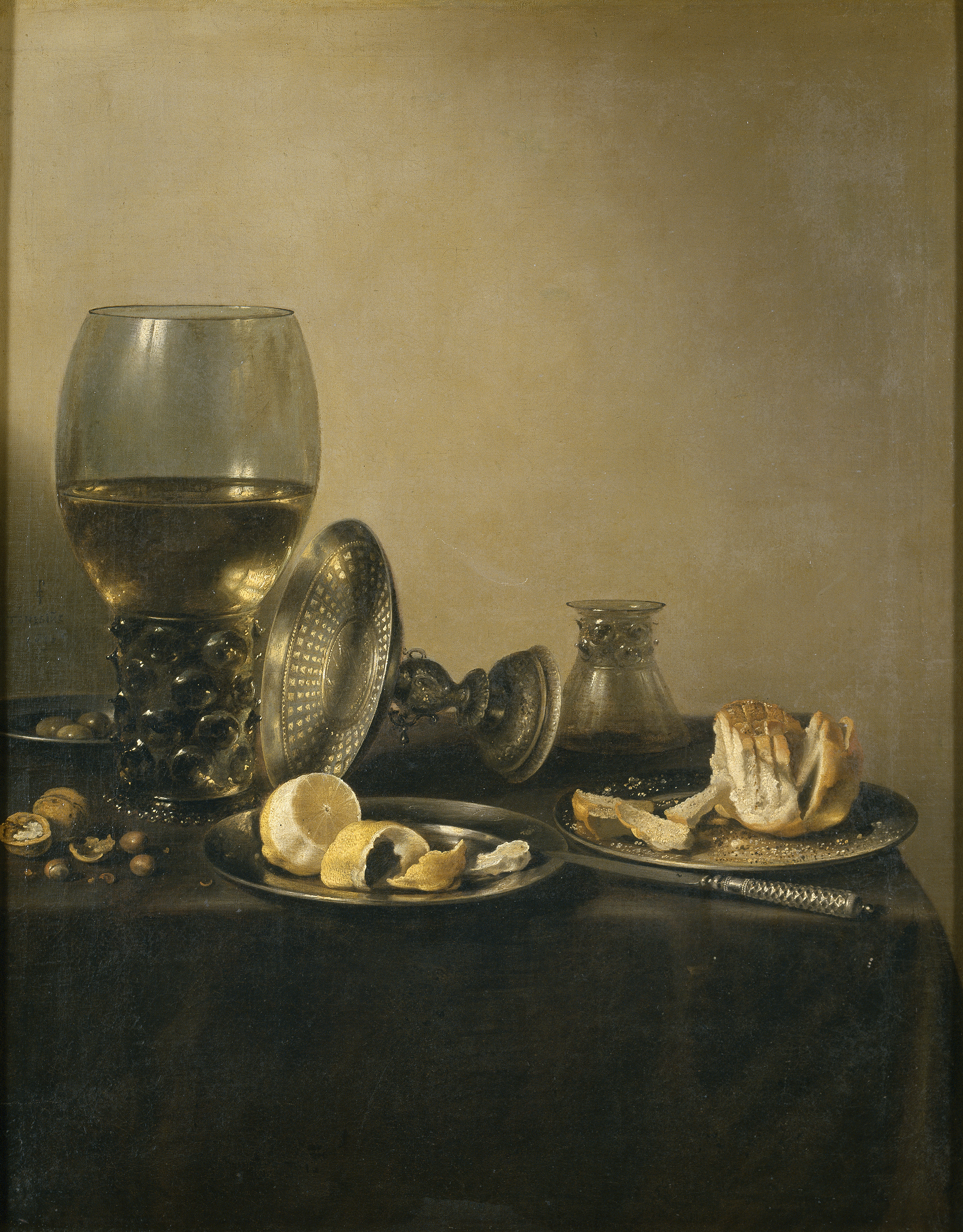
Pieter Claesz (1637)
