= Evert van Aelst =

Dutch painter

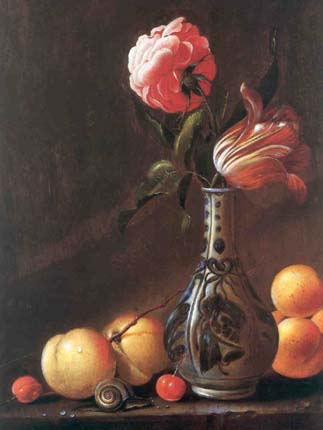
Flower still life by Evert van Aelst.

Evert van Aelst, sometimes known as Everard Aalst, (1602 in Delft – 19 February 1657 in Delft) was a Dutch still life painter.

Van Aelst was the uncle and teacher of Willem van Aelst. Both were famous for their still life paintings of game, fish, vases, etc. He was influenced by Pieter Claesz. According to Houbraken, he spent four years in France and seven in Italy. The grand duke of Tuscany became his patron and handsomely rewarded him for his works. When he returned to the Netherlands he settled in Delft, where he set up shop making still lifes, which were highly successful in his lifetime. Emanuel de Witte, his nephew Willem and Jacob Denys were his students.
