= Prunt =

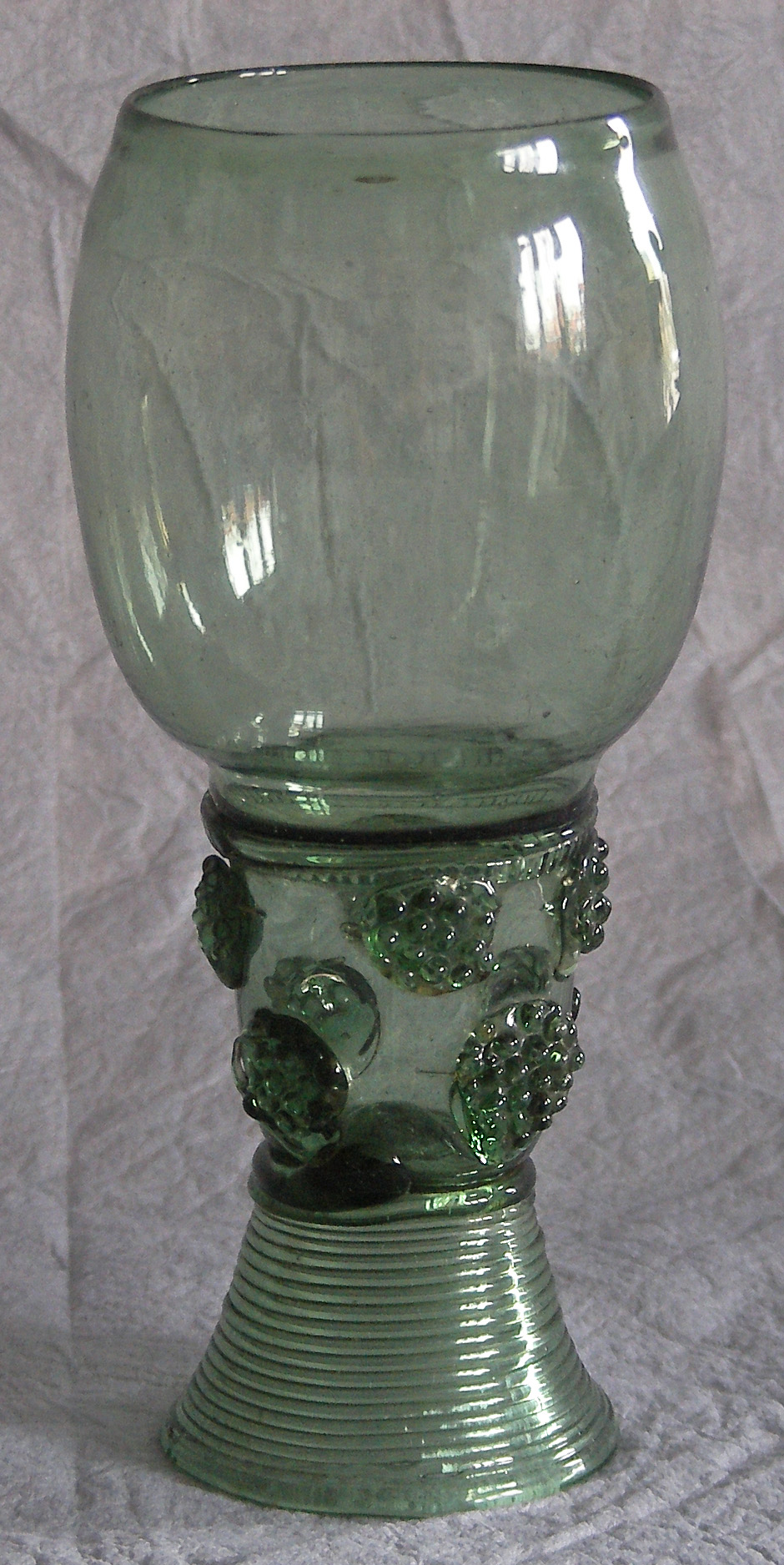
A Römer with impressed prunts on the stem.

A prunt is a small blob of glass fused to another piece of glass. Prunts are applied primarily as decoration, but also help provide a firm grip in the absence of a handle. Prunts may be impressed into decorative shapes, such as raspberries, blackberries, or lion's heads.

Prunts are a common stylistic element in German glassware, such as the rummer and Berkemeyer styles of drinking glass.

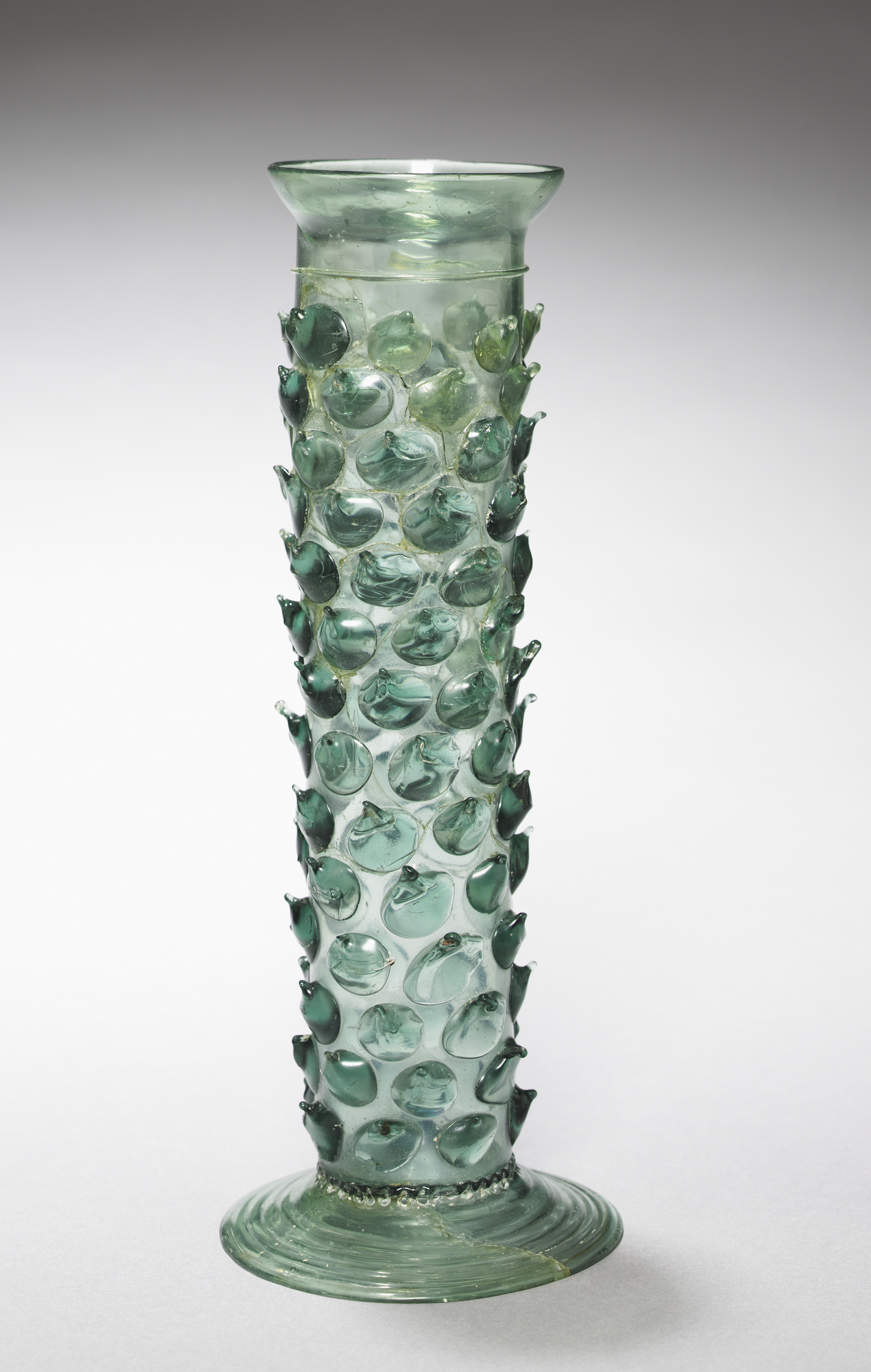
Stangenglas Tall Beaker with Prunts, Germany late 15th century

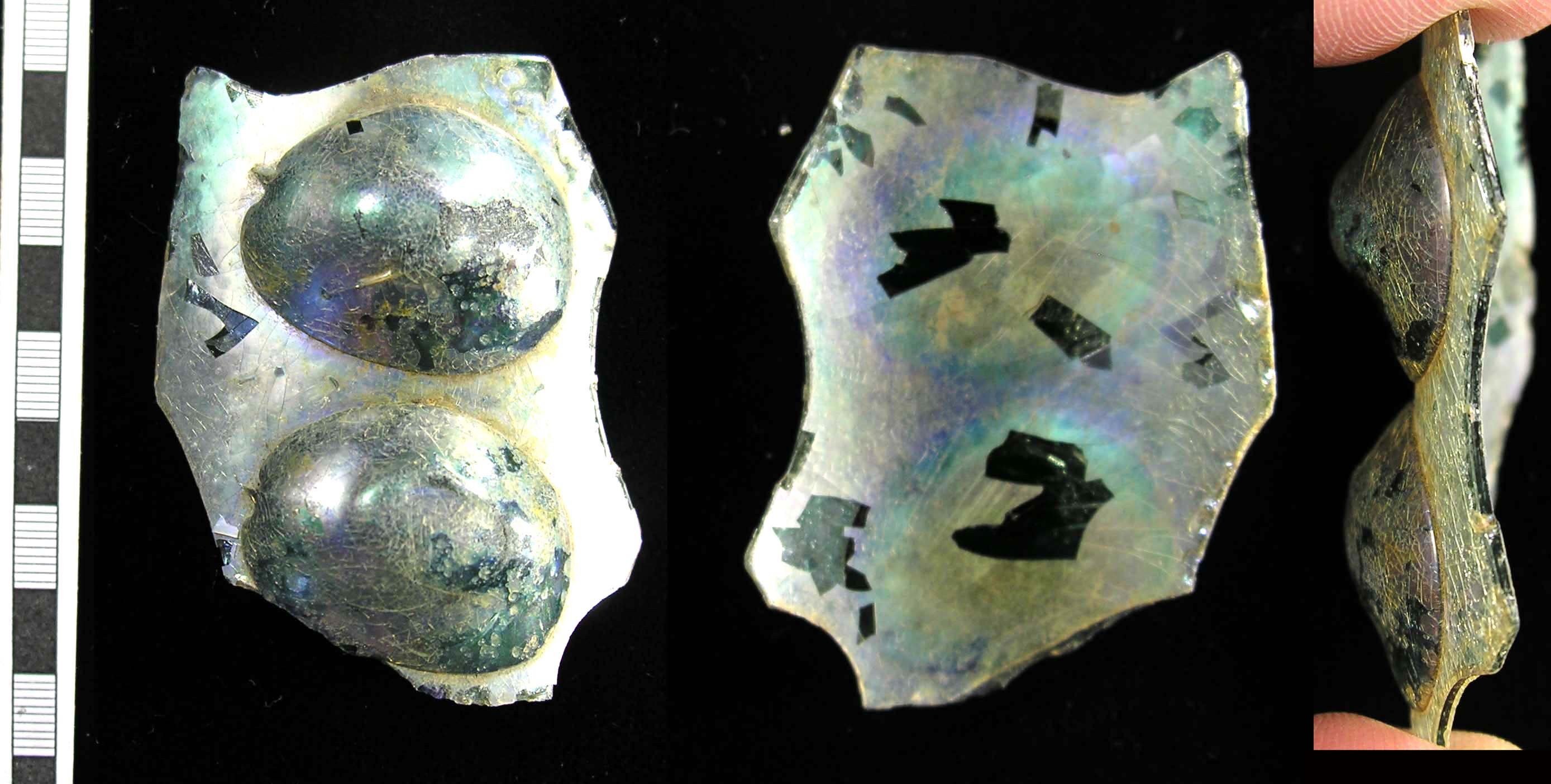
Glass fragment of Roemer with pulled prunts (beaker), between 1500 and 1620
