= Vanitas with the Spinario =

1628 still life painting by Pieter Claesz

Vanitas Still Life with the Spinario
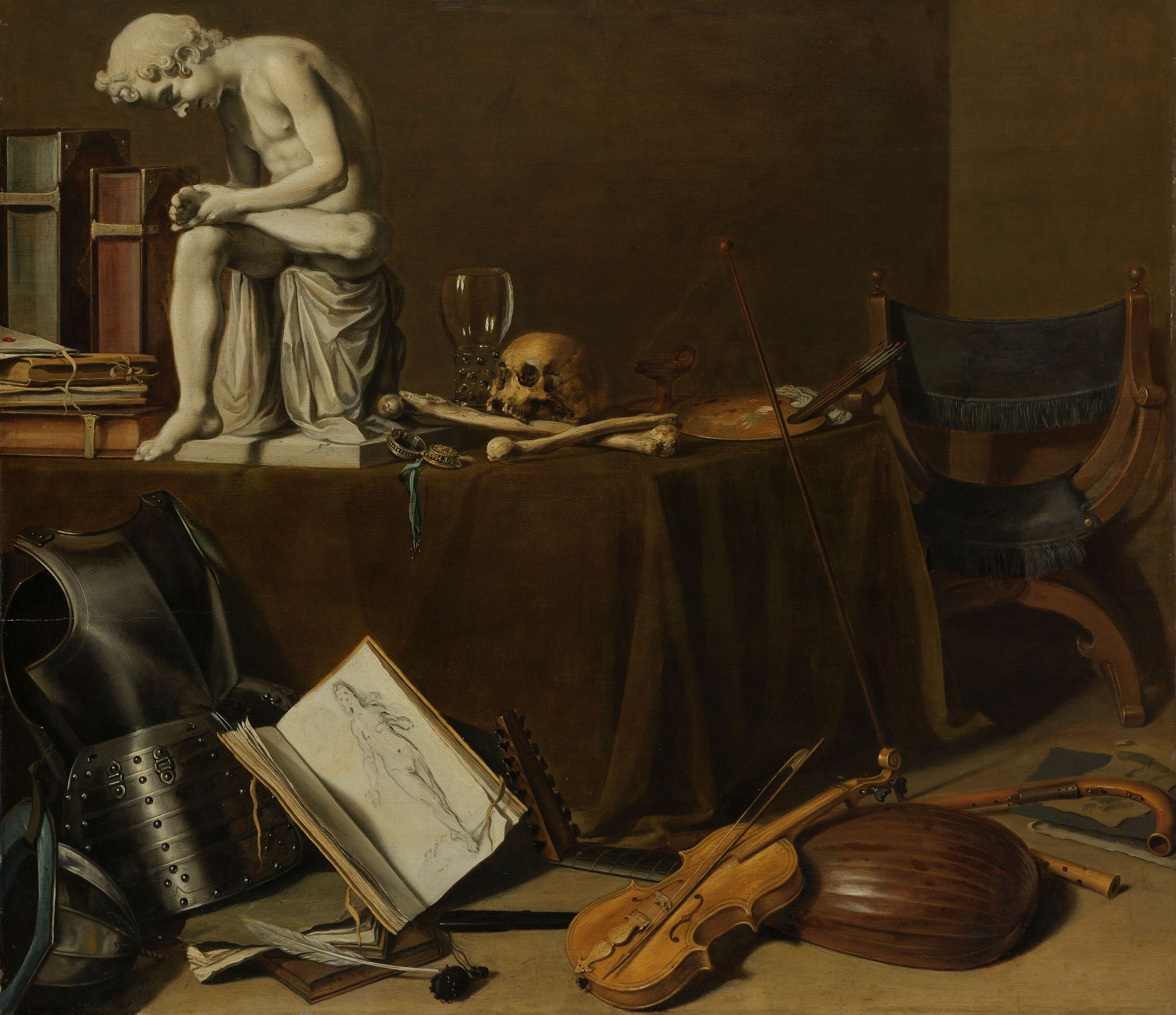
- Artist: Pieter Claesz
- Year: 1628
- Medium: oil paint, panel
- Dimensions: 71.5 cm (28.1 in) × 80.5 cm (31.7 in)
- Location: Rijksmuseum, Netherlands
- Accession: SK-A-3930

Vanitas with the Spinario is a 1628 still life painting by Pieter Claesz, now in the Rijksmuseum in Amsterdam. It belongs to the sub-genre of vanitas. To the left is a reduced-size reproduction of the Spinario statue.

== Sources ==
- (in Spanish) Rynck, Patrick de: Pieter Claesz, «Naturaleza muerta vanitas con el "Spinario"», en las pp. 266–267 de Cómo leer la pintura, 2005, Grupo Editorial Random House Mondadori, S.L., ISBN 84-8156-388-9
