= Pieter Claesz =

Dutch painter

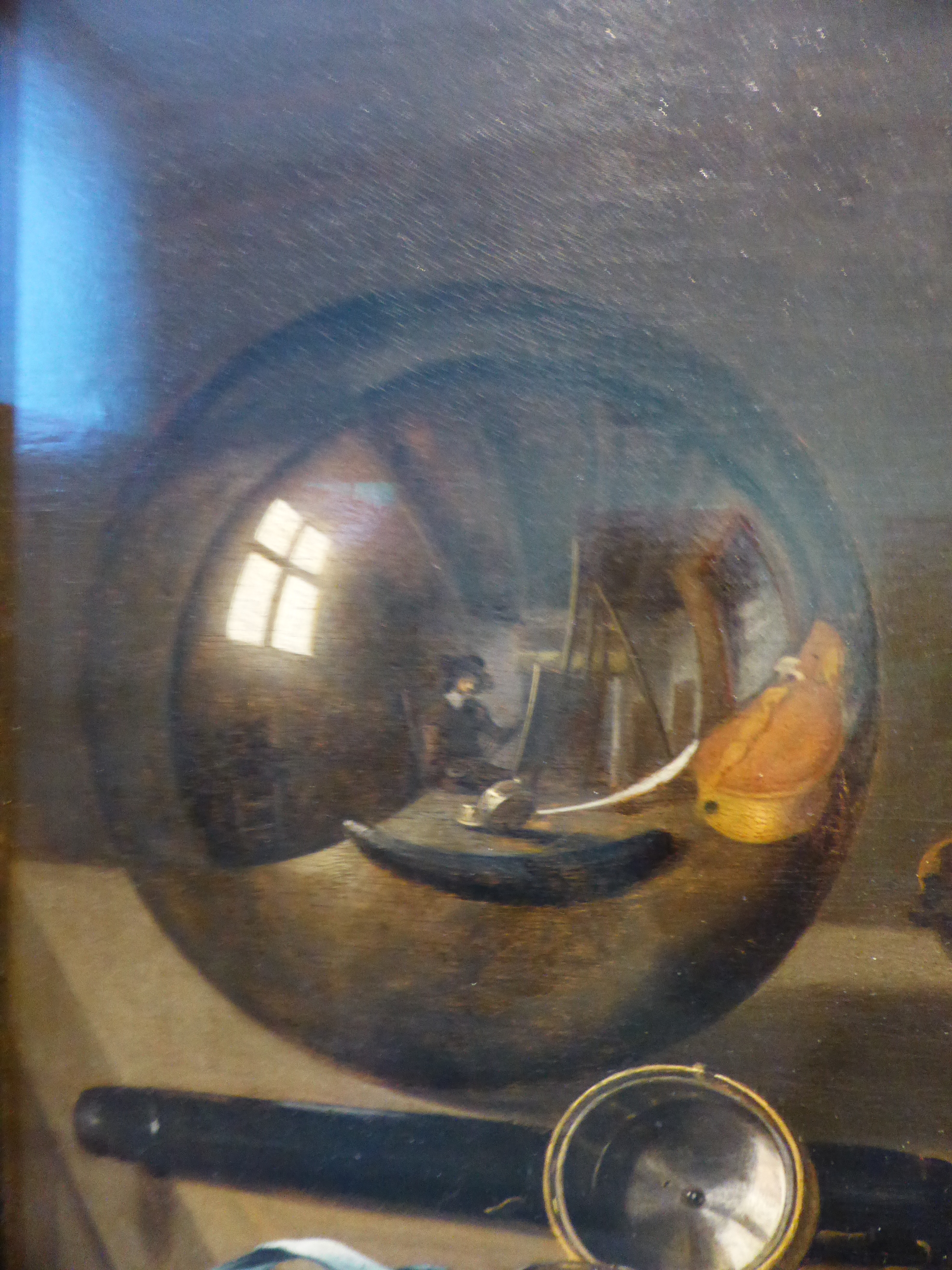
- Vanitas with Violin and Glass Ball (detail); the artist is visible in the reflection, 1625
- Born: Pieter Claesz; 1597; Berchem
- Died: 1660 (aged 62–63); Haarlem
- Known for: Painting
- Movement: Baroque

Pieter Claesz (c. 1597 – 1 January 1660) was a Dutch Golden Age painter of still lifes.

== Biography ==
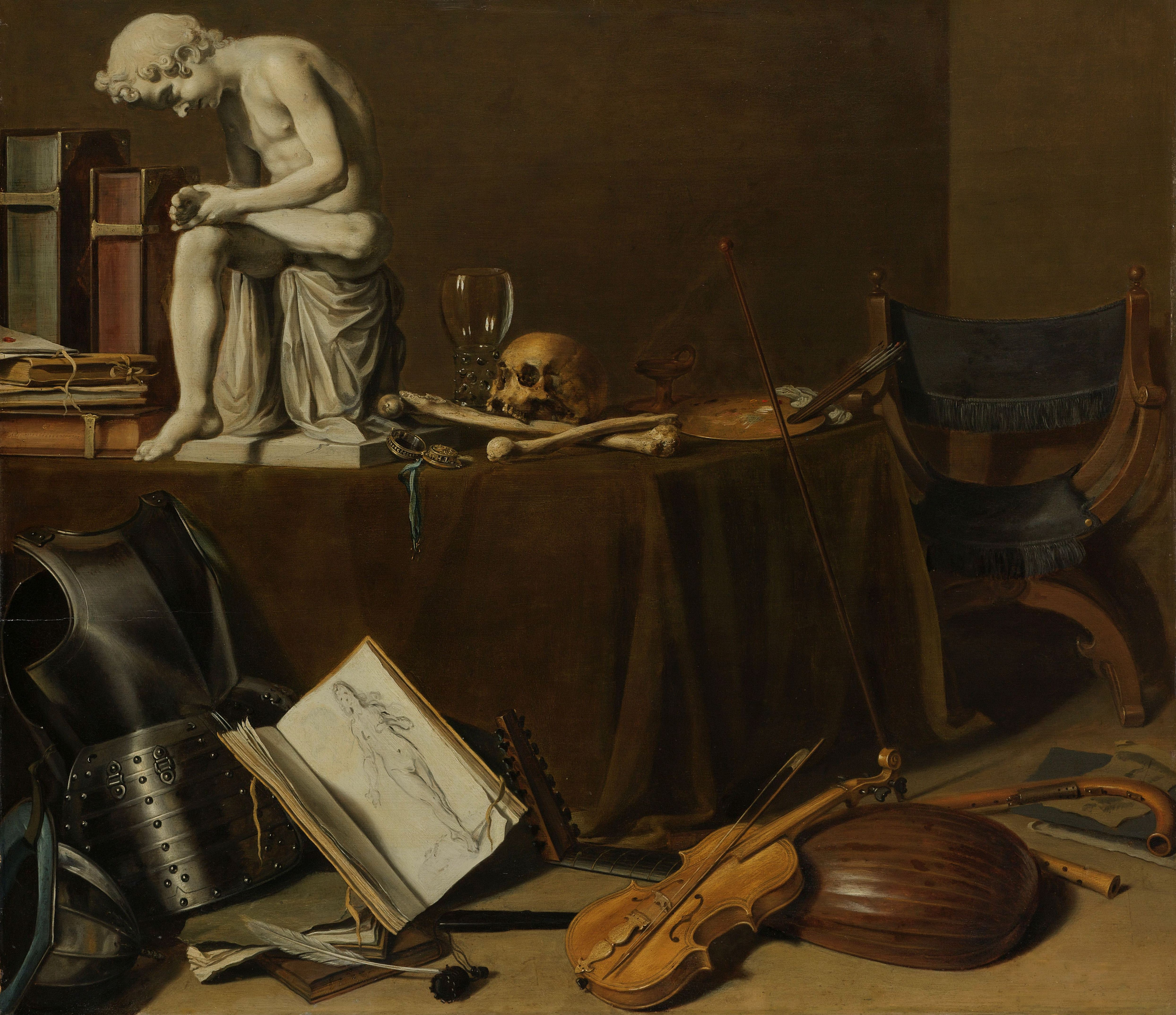
Vanitas with the Spinario, 1628, Rijksmuseum, Amsterdam.

He was born in Berchem, Belgium, near Antwerp, where he became a member of the Guild of St. Luke in 1620. He moved to Haarlem in 1620, where his son, the landscape painter Nicolaes Pieterszoon Berchem was born (October 1). He and Willem Claeszoon Heda, who also worked in Haarlem, were the most important exponents of the "ontbijt" or breakfast piece. They painted with subdued, virtually monochromatic palettes, the subtle handling of light and texture being the prime means of expression. Claesz generally chose objects of a more hospitable kind than Heda, although his later work became more colourful and decorative. Claesz's still lifes often suggest allegorical purpose, with skulls serving as reminders of human mortality. The two men founded a distinguished tradition of still life painting in Haarlem. Pieter Claesz was influenced by the vanitas movement.

== Legacy ==
Claesz is registered in the Haarlem Guild of St. Luke as the teacher of his son, Nicolaes Berchem, in 1634, but Nicolaes preferred landscapes to still life painting and later after a trip his talent in music. Claesz had, in addition to his son, the pupils Evert van Aelst, Floris van Dyck, Christian Berentz, Floris van Schooten, and Jan Jansz Treck.

== Selected works ==
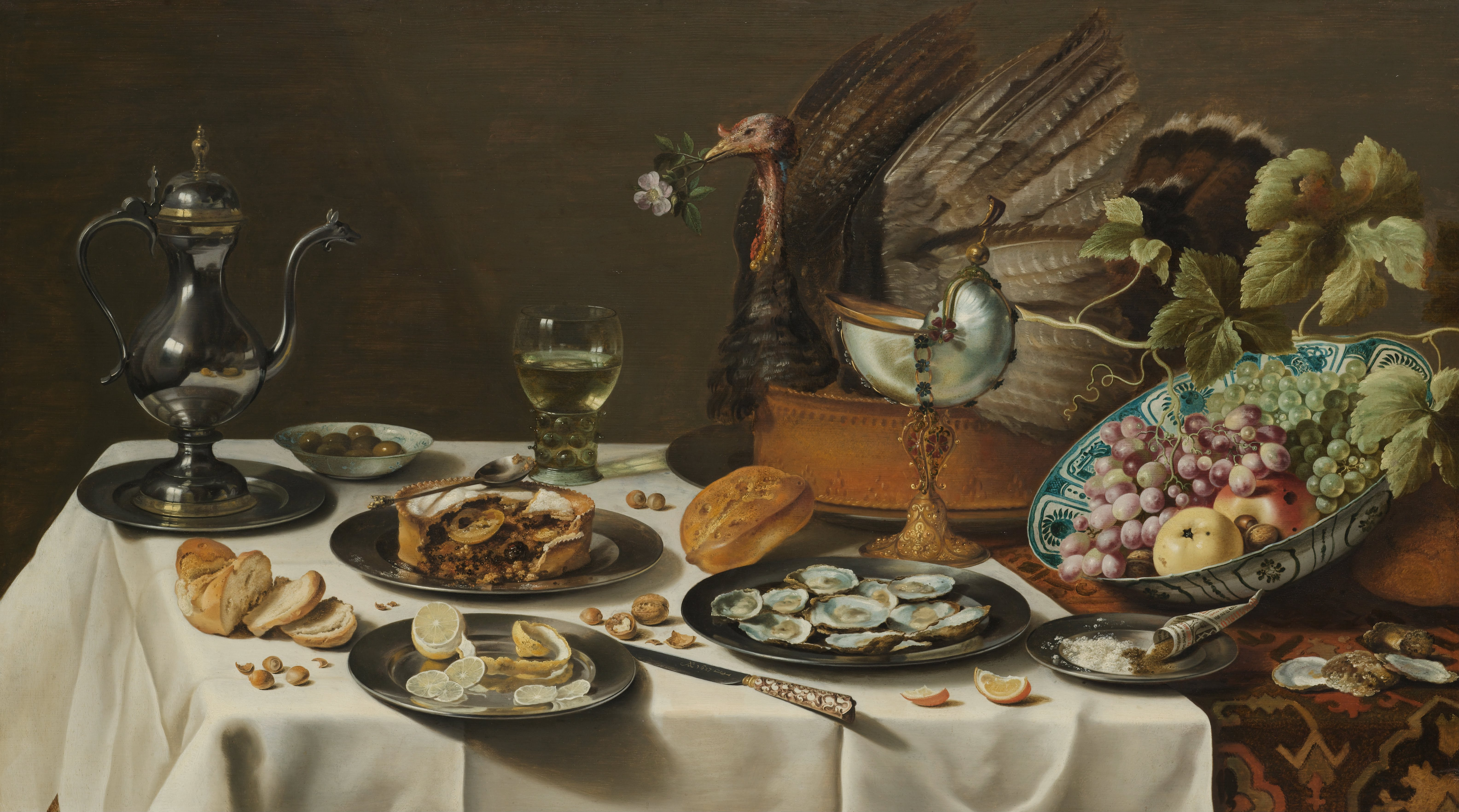
Still Life with Turkey Pie, 1627, Rijksmuseum, Amsterdam.

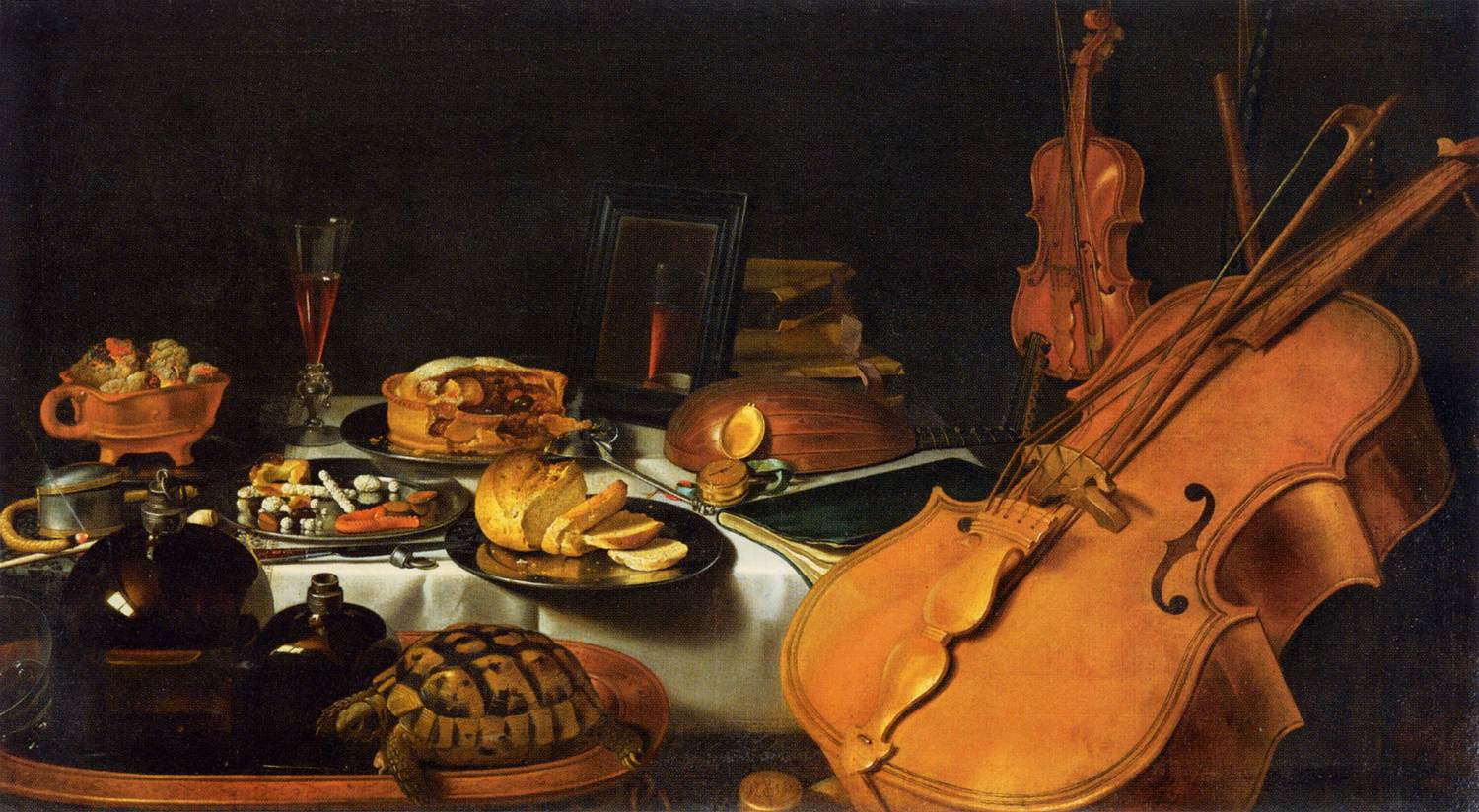
Still Life with Musical Instruments, 1623, Louvre Museum, Paris.

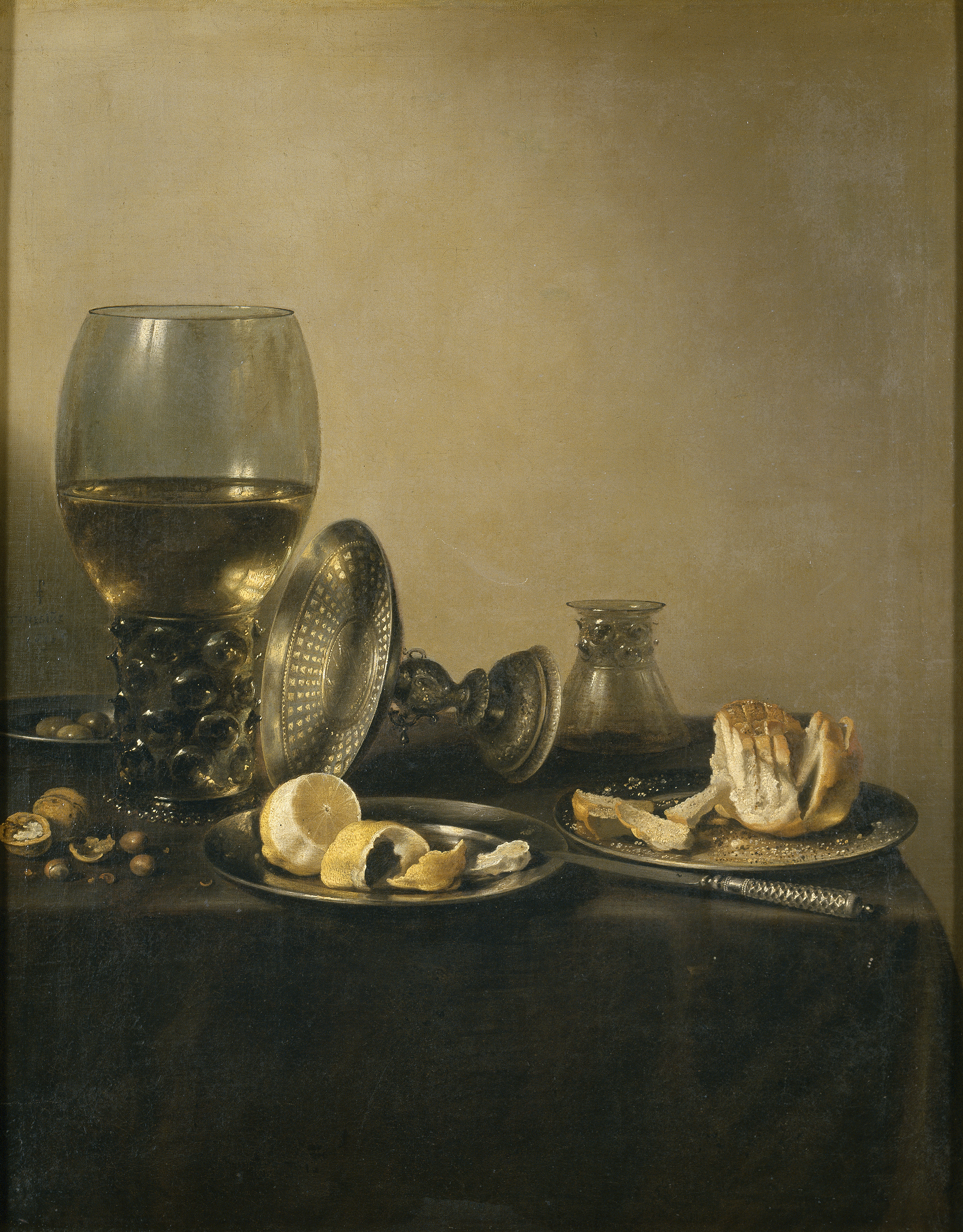
Still Life with Römer, Silver Tazza and Bread Roll, 1637, Museo del Prado, Madrid.

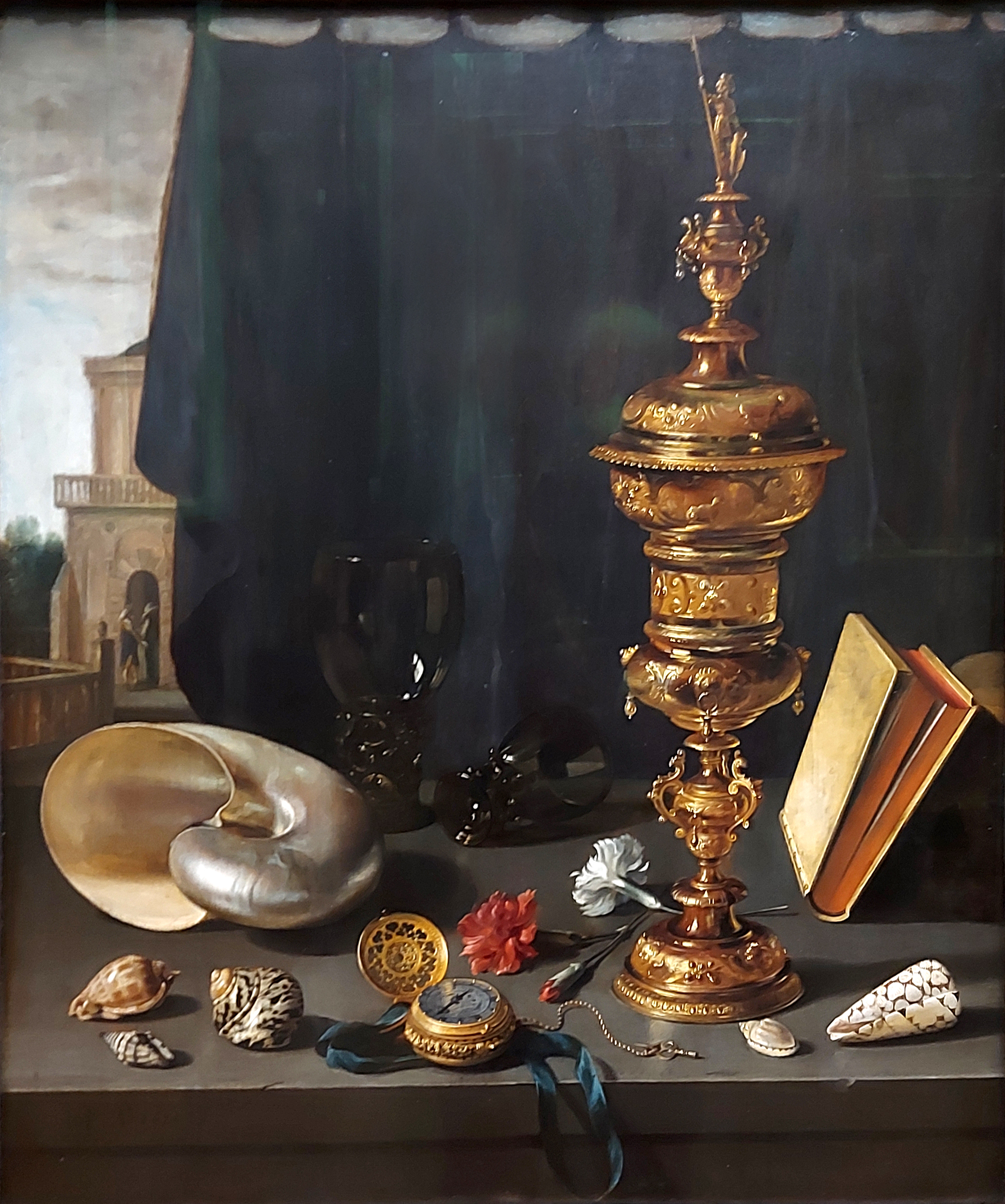
A Still-Life with a Tall Golden Geblet, 1624, Gemäldegalerie Alte Meister, Dresden.

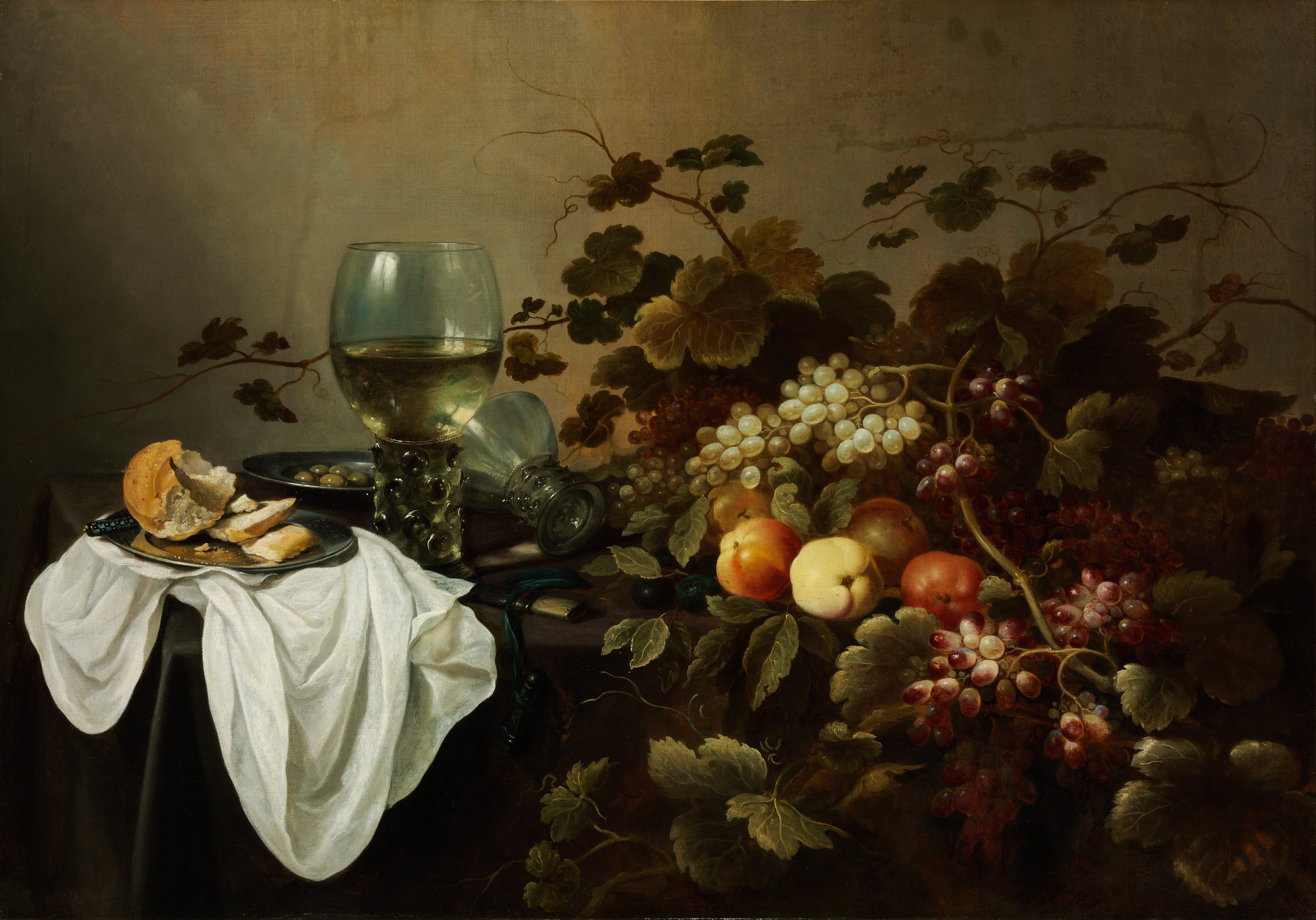
Still Life with fruit, bread and roemer, 1644, Szépművészeti Múzeum, Budapest.
