= Emanuel de Witte =

Dutch painter

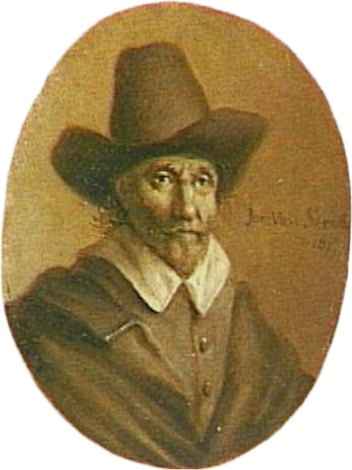
- Portrait of Emanuel de Witte by Jan Stolker
- Born: 1617; Alkmaar, Dutch Republic
- Died: 1692 (74-75 years); Amsterdam, Dutch Republic
- Education: Evert van Aelst
- Occupations: Painter, Draughtsman
- Writing career
- Period: Dutch Baroque
- Subject: Architecture

Emanuel de Witte (1617–1692) was a Dutch perspective painter. In contrast to Pieter Jansz Saenredam, who emphasized architectural accuracy, De Witte was more concerned with the atmosphere of his interiors. Though few in number, de Witte also produced genre paintings.

== Life ==
De Witte was born in Alkmaar and learned geometry from his father a schoolmaster. He joined the local Guild of St Luke in 1636. After a stay in Rotterdam, he moved to Delft and studied with Evert van Aelst. In 1651 de Witte settled in Amsterdam where his first wife, Geerje Arents, died in 1655. He then married a 23-year-old orphan, Lysbeth van der Plas, who exercised a bad influence on de Witte's adolescent daughter. In December 1659 both were arrested for theft from a neighbour. Lysbeth, pregnant, had to leave the city for a period of six years; she lived outside the city walls and died in 1663.

Following the arrest of his wife and child, de Witte was forced to indenture himself to the Amsterdam notary and art dealer Joris de Wijs, surrendering all of his work in exchange for room, board, and 800 guilders annually. De Witte broke the contract, was sued by the dealer, and forced to indenture himself further as a result. Several patrons provided de Witte with support, but these relations did not work out well, for he tended to shout at his clients and at people watching him at work in churches. Records tell of his gambling habit and a fight with Gerard de Lairesse. Around 1688 he moved in with Hendrick van Streeck, in exchange for training him as a painter of church interiors. According to Arnold Houbraken, after an argument about the rent, de Witte hanged himself from a canal bridge in Amsterdam in 1692. The rope broke and de Witte drowned. Because the canal froze that night, his corpse was not found until eleven weeks later.

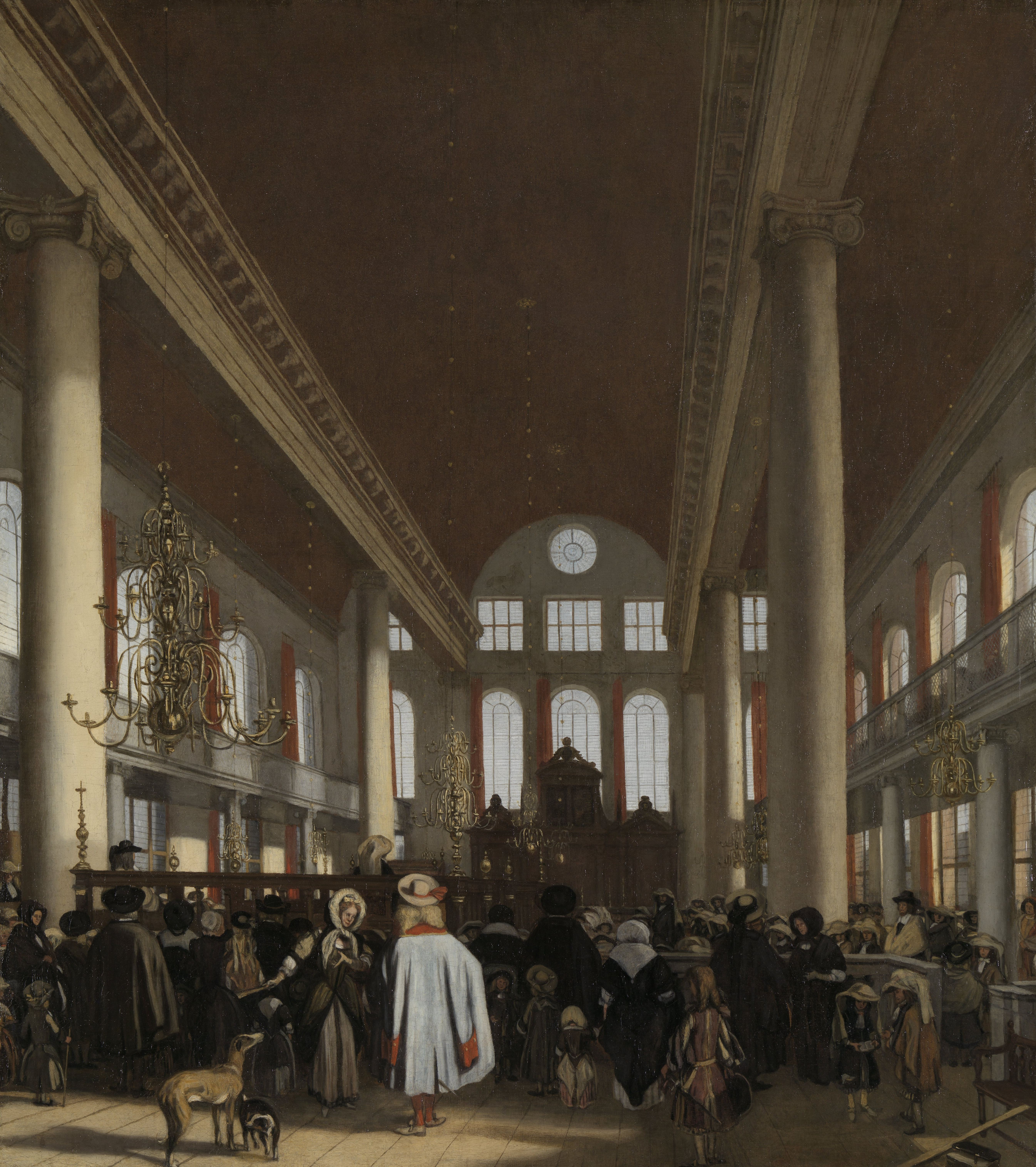
Interior of the Portuguese synagogue in Amsterdam, 1680.

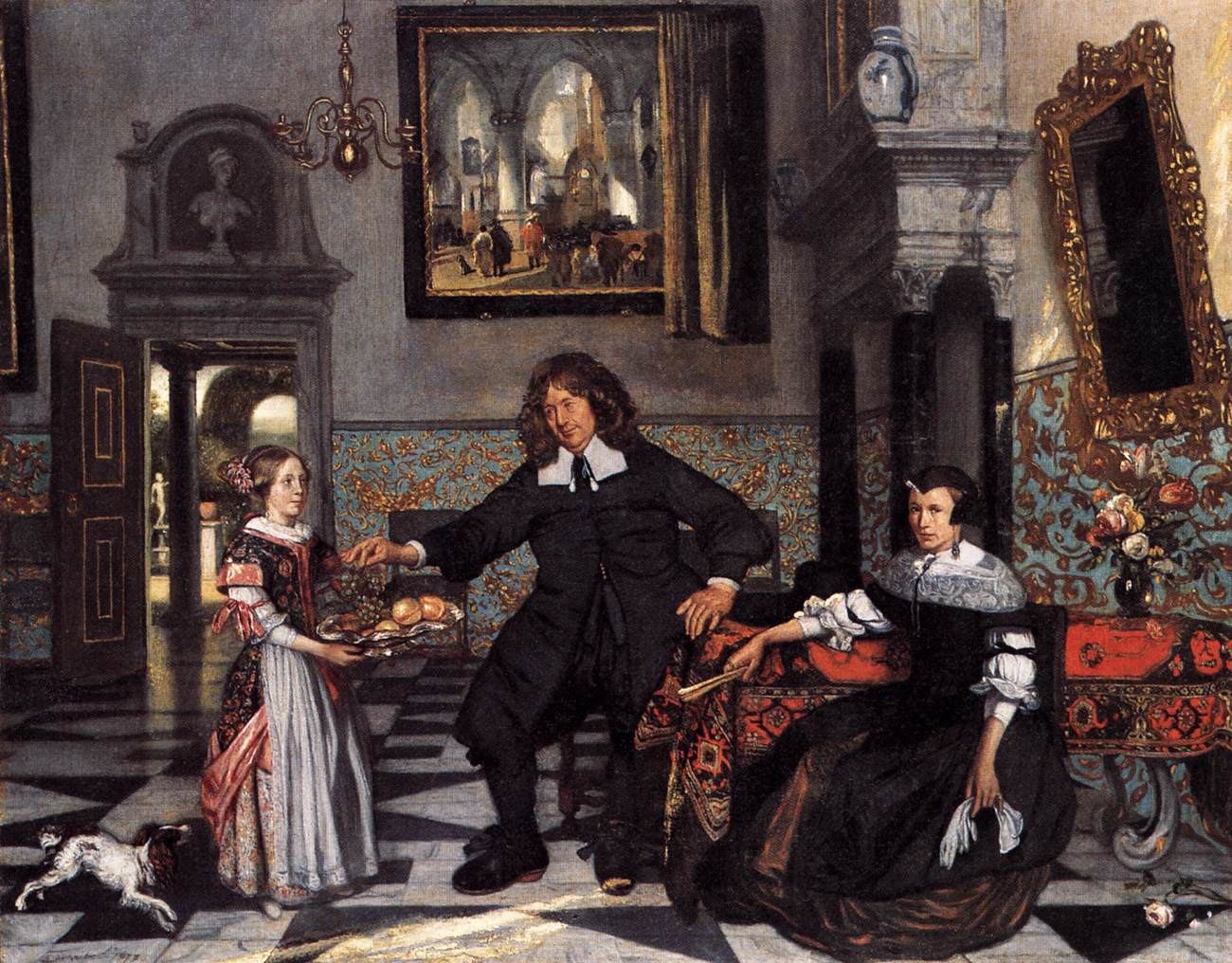
Portrait of a Family in an Interior (Family of Pieter de Graeff), 1678

De Witte initially painted portraits as well as mythological and religious scenes. After his move from Delft to Amsterdam in 1651, de Witte specialized more and more in representing church interiors, and also he painted the old church in Amsterdam from almost every corner. He sometimes combined aspects of different churches to depict interiors of ideal churches, populating them with churchgoers, sometimes accompanied by a dog. De Witte's excellent sense of composition combined with his use of light created a powerful sense of space. According to Walter Liedtke, de Witt's "main interest was the space itself – its light, color, sheer extent, and mood – not the architecture for its own sake"; the careful arrangement of light serves to "intensify the sensation of being within a great but at the same time sheltered space."

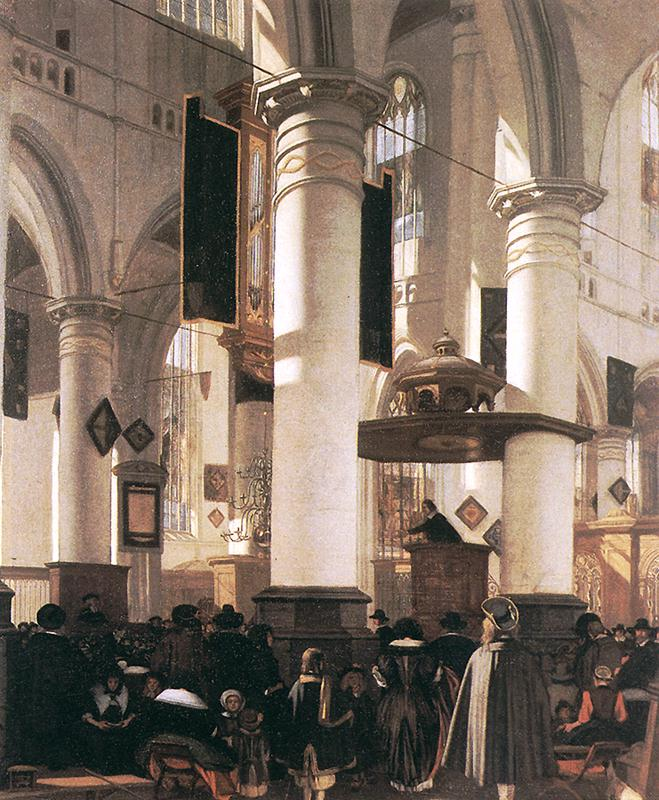
"Interior of a Church", by Emmanuel de Witte c. 1660

== Sources ==
- E. P. Richardson, De Witte and the imaginative nature of Dutch art in Art Quarterly I, 1938, S. 5 ff.
